= Index of racism-related articles =

This is a list of topics related to racism:

== A ==
- Ableism
- Abraham Lincoln and slavery
- Abolitionism
- Abolitionism in Brazil
- Abolitionism in the United States
- Abolitionism in the United Kingdom
- Adolf Hitler
- Adultification bias
- Affirmative action
- African-American culture
- African-American history
- African American–Jewish relations
- AfriForum
- African National Congress
- Afrocentrism
- Afrophobia
- Alex Linder
- Alt-right
- Alt-right pipeline
- Alt-tech
- American Indian Movement
- American Indian Wars
- American militia movement
- Ancient Egyptian race controversy
- Andrew Anglin
- Anti-Afghan sentiment
- Anti-Albanian sentiment
- Anti-Americanism
- Anti-Apartheid Movement
- Anti-Arab racism
- Anti-Armenian sentiment
- Anti-Azerbaijani sentiment
- Anti-Canadian sentiment
- Anti-Catholicism
- Anti-Catholicism in the United States
- Anti-Chinese sentiment
- Anti-Chinese sentiment in the United States
- Anti-Croat sentiment
- Anti-discrimination law
- Anti-English sentiment
- Anti-Europeanism
- Antifa (United States)
- Anti-fascism
- Anti-Fascist Action
- Anti-Finnish sentiment
- Anti-French sentiment
- Anti-Georgian sentiment
- Anti-German sentiment
- Anti-Greek sentiment
- Anti-Hungarian sentiment
- Anti-Igbo sentiment
- Anti-Indian sentiment
- Anti-Iranian sentiment
- Anti-Irish sentiment
- Anti-Italianism
- Anti-Japaneseism
- Anti-Japanese sentiment
- Anti-Japanese sentiment in the United States
- Anti-Khmer sentiment
- Anti-Korean sentiment
- Anti-Kurdish sentiment
- Anti–Middle Eastern sentiment
- Anti-miscegenation laws
- Anti-Mongolianism
- Anti-Palestinianism
- Anti-Polish sentiment
- Anti-Qing sentiment
- Anti-racism
- Anti-Racist Action
- Anti-Romani sentiment
- Anti-Russian sentiment
- Antisemitism
- Antisemitism in the Arab world
- Antisemitism in China
- Antisemitism in Christianity
- Antisemitism in Europe
- Antisemitism in 21st century Germany
- Antisemitism in Islam
- Antisemitism in Japan
- Antisemitism in the United States
- Antisemitism in the United States in the 21st century
- Anti-Serb sentiment
- Anti-Slavic sentiment
- Anti-Thai sentiment
- Anti-Tibetan sentiment
- Anti-Turkish sentiment
- Anti-Ukrainian sentiment
- Anti-Vietnamese sentiment
- Anti-Western sentiment
- Apartheid
- Arab slave trade
- Ariosophy
- Arnold Leese
- Ariosophy
- Aryan Brotherhood
- Aryan Brotherhood of Texas
- Aryan Circle
- Aryanism
- Aryan Nations
- Aryan race
- Aryan Republican Army
- Asian American activism
- Asian pride
- Assembly of Christian Soldiers
- Atlantic slave trade
- Atomwaffen Division
- August Kreis
- Aversive racism

== B ==
- Back-to-Africa movement
- 16th Street Baptist Church bombing
- The Base (hate group)
- Beate Klarsfeld
- Benjamin H. Freedman
- Benjamin Tillman
- Ben Kiernan
- Ben Klassen
- Black Codes (United States)
- Blackface
- Black genocide in the United States
- Black Hebrew Israelites
- Black is beautiful
- Black Legion (political movement)
- Black Lives Matter
- Black nationalism
- Black Panther Party
- Black people
- Black people and Mormonism
- Black people and Mormon priesthood
- Black power
- Black power movement
- Black supremacy
- Blood & Honour
- Blood and soil
- Blood and Soil (book)
- Blood libel
- Bobby Frank Cherry
- Boogaloo movement
- Bo Gritz
- Brigham Young
- British Israelism
- British National Party
- British Union of Fascists
- Brown v. Board of Education
- Buddy Tucker
- 2022 Buffalo shooting
- Bumiputra
- Byron De La Beckwith

== C ==
- Canadian Anti-racism Education and Research Society
- Charleston church shooting
- Charlottesville car attack
- Chevie Kehoe
- Chinese Exclusion Act
- Christchurch mosque shootings
- Christian Defense League
- Christian Identity
- Christian nationalism
- Christian Nationalist Crusade
- Christian Picciolini
- Christian slavery
- Christian views on slavery
- Church of Israel
- Church of Jesus Christ–Christian
- Citizens' Councils
- Civil rights movement (1865–1896)
- Civil rights movement (1896–1954)
- Civil rights movement
- Colin Jordan
- Colonial mentality
- Colorism
- Confederate monuments and memorials
- Council of Federated Organizations
- Congress of Racial Equality
- Conspiracy theory
- Council of Conservative Citizens
- The Covenant, the Sword, and the Arm of the Lord
- Cracker
- Craig Cobb
- Creativity
- Cross burning#Symbol of the Ku Klux Klan
- Cultural appropriation
- Cultural assimilation
- Cultural competence
- Cultural conflict
- Cultural genocide
- Cultural sensitivity
- Culture war
- Curse and mark of Cain
- Curse of Ham

== D ==
- The Daily Stormer
- David Duke
- David Lane (white supremacist)
- D. C. Stephenson
- Deacons for Defense and Justice
- Death to America
- Death to Arabs
- La Difesa della Razza
- Der Stürmer
- Discrimination
- Discrimination based on skin tone
- Dixie (song)
- Dominant minority
- Don Black (white supremacist)
- Dubul' ibhunu
- Dwight York
- Dylann Roof

== E ==
- Edgar Ray Killen
- Eldred Kurtz Means
- Eldridge Cleaver
- Elijah Muhammad
- Elohim City, Oklahoma
- 2019 El Paso shooting
- Emmett Till
- end of slavery in the united states
- end of slavery in France
- Enforcement Acts
- Environmental racism
- Eric Rudolph
- Ethnic cleansing
- Ethnic conflict
- Ethnic group
- Ethnic issues in Japan
- Ethnic nationalism
- Ethnic penalty
- Ethnic religion
- Ethnic stereotype
- Ethnic violence
- Ethnocentrism
- Ethnocide
- Eugenics
- Eurocentrism

== F ==
- Faithful Word Baptist Church
- Far-right politics
- Far-right subcultures
- Fascism
- Fascism and ideology
- Fascist (insult)
- Fascist symbolism
- Five-Percent Nation
- Frazier Glenn Miller Jr.
- French Israelism
- Friends of New Germany
- Fritz Julius Kuhn
- From the river to the sea
- Fundamentalist Church of Jesus Christ of Latter-Day Saints

== G ==
- Genocide
- Geography of antisemitism
- George Floyd
- George Floyd protests
- George Lincoln Rockwell
- George Washington and slavery
- Gerald L. K. Smith
- German-American Bund
- German collective guilt
- Golden Dawn (Greece)
- Gordon Kahl
- Great Replacement
- Greensboro massacre
- Grey Wolves
- Groups claiming affiliation with Israelites

== H ==
- Half-breed
- Half-caste
- Hal Turner
- Hamites
- Hammerskins
- Hate crime
- Hate crime laws in the United States
- Hate group
- Hate media
- Hate speech
- Hate studies
- Helen Bannerman
- Huey P. Newton
- Hispanic and Latino (ethnic categories)
- Historical race concepts
- History of antisemitism
- History of Christian thought on persecution and tolerance
- History of the Jews during World War II
- History of the Romani people
- History of slavery
- History wars
- Hitlers Zweites Buch
- Hitler's prophecy
- The Holocaust
- Holocaust denial
- Holocaust studies
- Holocaust trivialization
- Holocaust uniqueness debate
- Holocaust victims
- Honorary Aryan
- Hoteps
- Houston Stewart Chamberlain
- Howard Rand
- Human Zoo
- Hutton Gibson
- Hutu Power

== I ==
- Ian Smith
- Ian Stuart Donaldson
- Identitarian movement
- Identity politics
- Immigration Act of 1917
- Immigration Act of 1924
- Imperial Fascist League
- Imperial Klans of America
- Imperium Europa
- Incel
- Indiana Klan
- Indian Citizenship Act
- Indian National Congress
- In-group and out-group
- Roy Innis
- Niger Innis
- International Association of Black Professional Firefighters
- Institute for Historical Review
- Institutional racism
- Interminority racism in the United States
- Isaac Woodard
- Islamic views on slavery
- Italian fascism
- Italian fascism and racism
- Italian racial laws

== J ==
- James Ellison (white supremacist)
- James Wickstrom
- Jane Elliott
- J. B. Stoner
- Jena Six
- Jewish Defense League
- Jewish Defense Organization
- Jewish history
- Jewish views on slavery
- Jews
- Jew Watch
- Jim Crow (character)
- Jim Crow laws
- Jump Jim Crow
- Johnny Lee Clary
- Johnny Rebel (singer)
- Joseph Smith

== K ==
- Kahane Chai
- Kahanism
- Kevin Alfred Strom
- Khalid Abdul Muhammad
- Khazar hypothesis of Ashkenazi ancestry
- Khaybar Khaybar ya yahud
- Kingdom Identity Ministries
- Kinism
- Knights of the Golden Circle
- Knights of the White Camelia
- Ku Klux Klan
- Ku Klux Klan Act

== L ==
- LaPorte Church of Christ
- Leo Frank
- Liberty Lobby
- Limpieza de sangre
- List of changes made due to the George Floyd protests
- List of ethnic cleansing campaigns
- List of ethnic riots
- List of ethnic slurs
- List of expulsions of African Americans
- List of fascist movements
- List of fascist movements by country
- List of genocides
- List of Ku Klux Klan organizations
- List of neo-Nazi organizations
- List of organizations designated by the Southern Poverty Law Center as hate groups
- List of phobias
- List of religious slurs
- List of symbols designated by the Anti-Defamation League as hate symbols
- List of white nationalist organizations
- Lists of pejorative terms for people
- Little Rock Nine
- Los Angeles Jewish Community Center shooting
- Lost Cause of the Confederacy
- Louis Beam
- Louis Farrakhan
- Lynching
- Lynching in the United States
- Lynching of Michael Donald

== M ==
- Madison Grant
- Malcolm X
- Manifest destiny
- Manifesto of Race
- Marcus Garvey
- Martin Luther King Jr.
- Mass racial violence in the United States
- Master race
- Matthew F. Hale
- Matthew Heimbach
- Medgar Evers
- Mein Kampf
- Mel Gibson
- Mexican Repatriation
- Michael Kühnen
- Michael W. Ryan
- Minstrel show
- Minuteman Project
- Miscegenation
- Mississippi Burning
- Mississippi State Sovereignty Commission
- Model minority
- Modern display of the Confederate battle flag
- Moorish Science Temple of America
- Mormon fundamentalism
- Mormonism and Pacific Islanders
- Mormonism and slavery
- Mormon teachings on skin color
- Morris Dees
- Murder of James Byrd Jr.
- Murders of Chaney, Goodman, and Schwerner
- Murders of Harry and Harriette Moore
- Murzyn
- Myanmar nationality law

== N ==
- NAACP
- Nadir of American race relations
- Nathan Bedford Forrest
- National Action (UK)
- National Alliance (Italy)
- National Alliance (United States)
- National Front (UK)
- National Knights of the Ku Klux Klan
- National Socialist black metal
- National Socialist Movement (United States)
- Nation of Islam
- Nation of Islam and antisemitism
- Nation of Yahweh
- Nationalism
- National States' Rights Party
- Native American mascot controversy
- Native American people and Mormonism
- Nativism
- Nativism in United States politics
- Nazism
- Nazi chic
- Nazi Lowriders
- Nazi Party
- Nazi punk
- Nazi racial theories
- Nazi symbolism
- Negro
- Negrophobia
- Neo-Confederates
- Neo-fascism
- Neo-Nazism
- Neo-völkisch movements
- New antisemitism
- New Black Panther Party
- New Zealand National Front
- Newham Monitoring Project
- Nick Griffin
- Nigger
- Non-violent extremism
- Nordicism
- Northwest Territorial Imperative
- Nuwaubian Nation

== O ==
- Oath Keepers
- Ocoee massacre
- One-drop rule
- Operation Red Dog
- Oswald Mosley
- Other (philosophy)
- Overland Park Jewish Community Center shooting

== P ==
- Palmer Raids
- Patriot Front
- Patriot movement
- Patriotic Youth League
- Paul Fromm (white supremacist)
- Person of color
- PewDiePie
- Phineas Priesthood
- Phrenology
- Pittsburgh synagogue shooting
- Plessy v. Ferguson
- Posse Comitatus
- Poway synagogue shooting
- Police brutality
- Portrayal of East Asians in American film and theater
- Pre-Adamite
- Prejudice
- Proud Boys
- Prussian Blue (duo)

== Q ==
- QAnon

== R ==
- Race
- Race and appearance of Jesus
- Race and crime in the United States
- Race and health in the United States
- Race and intelligence
- Race and sexuality
- Race and the war on drugs
- Race riot
- Racial discrimination
- Racial Equality Proposal
- Racialism
- Racial hierarchy
- Racial hoax
- Racial hygiene
- Racial literacy
- Racial policy of Nazi Germany
- Racial realism
- Racial segregation
- Racial tension in Omaha, Nebraska
- Racial views of Donald Trump
- Racism
- Racism against African Americans
- Racism against Asians
- Racism against Native Americans in the United States
- Racism by country
- Racism in Africa
- Racism in Asia
- Racism in Canada
- Racism in Europe
- Racism in horror films
- Racism in Israel
- Racism in Jewish communities
- Racism in Muslim communities
- Racism in North America
- Racism in South America
- Racism in the United Kingdom
- Racism in the United States
- Racism in the wine industry
- Radical right (Europe)
- Radical right (United States)
- Randy Weaver
- Redlining
- Redneck
- Redneck Revolt
- Red Power movement
- Red Shirts
- Red Summer
- Relations between Nazi Germany and the Arab world
- Removal of Confederate monuments and memorials
- Reparations Agreement between Israel and the Federal Republic of Germany
- Reparations for slavery
- Reparations for slavery in the United States
- Reptilian conspiracy theory
- Responsibility for the Holocaust
- Reverse discrimination or reverse racism
- Revilo P. Oliver
- Richard Butler (white supremacist)
- Richard B. Spencer
- Rick Tyler
- Right-wing politics
- Right-wing populism
- Right-wing terrorism
- Robert E. Lee
- Robert E. Miles
- Robert Jay Mathews
- Robert Relf
- Rosa Parks
- Rosewood massacre
- Ruby Ridge
- Ruscism

== S ==
- Samuel Bowers
- Savitri Devi
- Scientific racism
- Scottsboro Boys
- Scramble for Africa
- Self-hating Jew
- Self-hatred
- Separate but equal
- Serge Klarsfeld
- Serpent seed
- The Shepherd's Chapel
- Silver Legion of America
- Simon Wiesenthal
- Sinhala Only Act
- Sinocentrism
- Skinhead
- Slavery
- Slavery and religion
- Slavery by country
- Slavery in the United States
- Social Darwinism
- Sons of Confederate Veterans
- Southern Christian Leadership Conference
- Stormfront (website)
- Subhuman
- Stereotype
- Stereotypes of groups within the United States
- Steven Anderson (pastor)
- Stochastic terrorism
- Supremacism#Racial
- Swastika#Association with Nazism

== T ==
- Tatarophobia
- Ted Nugent
- The 1619 Project
- The Camp of the Saints
- Theodore G. Bilbo
- The Order (white supremacist group)
- The Passing of the Great Race
- The Rising Tide of Color Against White World-Supremacy
- The Shepherd's Chapel
- The Turner Diaries
- The White Man's Burden
- Thomas D. Rice
- Thomas Edwin Blanton Jr.
- Thomas Jefferson and slavery
- Thomas Robb (Ku Klux Klan)
- Three-fifths Compromise
- Timeline of Racial Tension in Omaha, Nebraska
- Tom Metzger
- Tulsa race massacre

== U ==
- Ultranationalism
- United Daughters of the Confederacy
- United Klans of America
- Unite the Right rally
- United States racial unrest (2020–2023)
- Universal Negro Improvement Association and African Communities League
- Untermensch
- Ustaše

== V ==
- Vanguard America
- Views of Elon Musk#Race and white nationalism
- Views of Kanye West#Race and antisemitism
- Völkisch movement
- Volksfront

== W ==
- Wallace Fard Muhammad
- Walter Plecker
- Warith Deen Mohammed
- Warren Jeffs
- Wesley A. Swift
- White Aryan Resistance
- White Australia policy
- White backlash
- White ethnostate
- White genocide conspiracy theory
- White guilt
- White Knights of the Ku Klux Klan
- White nationalism
- White Patriot Party
- White people
- White power music
- White power skinhead
- White pride
- White privilege
- White savior
- White supremacy
- White trash
- Wigger
- William Dudley Pelley
- William Luther Pierce
- William Potter Gale
- William Shockley
- Willis Carto
- Wilmington massacre
- Woodrow Wilson and race
- Wotansvolk

== X ==
- Xenophobia
- Xenophobia and discrimination in Turkey
- Xenophobia and racism in the Middle East
- Xenophobia and racism related to the COVID-19 pandemic
- Xenophobia in South Africa
- Xenophobia in the United States

== Y ==
- Yahweh ben Yahweh
- Yakub (Nation of Islam)
- Yellow Peril

== Z ==
- Zebra murders
- Zionist Occupation Government conspiracy theory
- Zoot Suit Riots
