= Russell Kelso Carter =

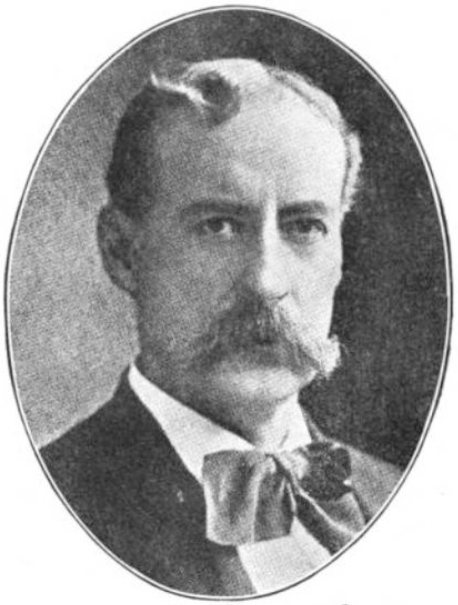
- Born: November 18, 1849; Baltimore, Maryland
- Died: August 23, 1928 (aged 78); Baltimore, Maryland
- Burial place: Green Mount Cemetery
- Occupations: Clergyman, educator, songwriter

Signature
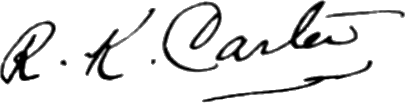

Russell Kelso Carter (November 18, 1849 - August 23, 1928) was an American Christian minister, professor, songwriter, and advocate of British Israelism.

== Biography ==
Carter was born in Baltimore, Maryland on November 18, 1849. He attended the Pennsylvania Military Academy, graduating in 1867 with a degree in Civil Engineering. After graduating he became a teacher of Science and Chemistry at the academy until 1872. Carter changed careers several times in his life and was a prolific writer on topics of religion, mathematics and science.

Carter was known for his faith healing teachings and has been credited as being a key influence on E. W. Kenyon's teachings that would later develop into the Word of Faith theology. In the 1884 book The Atonement for Sin and Sickness, Carter demonstrates an early version of what Kenyon would later preach as positive confession: "I only prayed, O, Lord, make me sure of the truth, and I will confess it; I have nothing to do with consequences; that is Thy part," and again, "Jesus has the keeping part, I have the believing and confessing."

Carter began experiencing health issues in 1886, beginning with what may have been a mental breakdown. Carter contracted malaria in 1888 that left him chronically weak for much of the remainder of his life. During his longtime illness, Carter wrote several Christian hymns, including the well known hymn Standing On The Promises. He met with different faith healers over the course of that year seeking a healing, but failed to improve. During that time he was prayed for by Charles Cullis, A.B. Simpson, and John Alexander Dowie. In 1892, Carter moved to California where he was involved in promoting questionable medical devices. Carter became connected with a couple of quack patent medical devices called the "Electropoise" and the "Oxydonor Victory." These machines were one of the first products taken to court for mail fraud by the US Postal Service, which eventually won its case against the manufacturers. In 1898, Carter became ill with tuberculosis, but recovered after medical treatment. In the last years of his life, Carter returned to Baltimore where he worked as a doctor until his death.

Carter was deeply influenced by British Israelism and became a prominent advocate of the idea in the United States. Carter became a well known preacher within the Church of God (Holiness). Carter also worked closely with the Alliance World Fellowship with Albert B. Simpson for many years, preaching at many of their conventions, but broke away from the Alliance when it rejected pentecostalism.

Carter played a key role in developing the two-seedline doctrine by incorporating a theory on the origin of the serpent's seedline. Carter theorized that Cain was the literal Son of the serpent in his book The Tree of Knowledge which he published in 1894. Carter believed that "the tremendous pull of the sexual appetite, aroused by the excited state of the woman" caused humanity's fall in the Garden of Eden. He believed that Satan used the seduction of Eve to destroy God's pure race "at its fountainhead". Carter stopped short of speculating on who the descendants of Cain might be, but he connected the righteous seedline with the Anglo-Saxons. Carter's teachings on the subject proved to be particularly appealing to members of the Ku Klux Klan and other white supremacists who spread the teachings during the 20th century. Carter's serpent seed teachings were incorporated into Christian Identity theology by such teachers as Wesley Swift, Conrad Gaard, and Dan Gayman.

He died in Baltimore on August 23, 1928, and was buried at Green Mount Cemetery.

== Hymns ==
- "Standing on the Promises of Christ the King"
