= Conrad Gaard =

Early Christian Identity minister

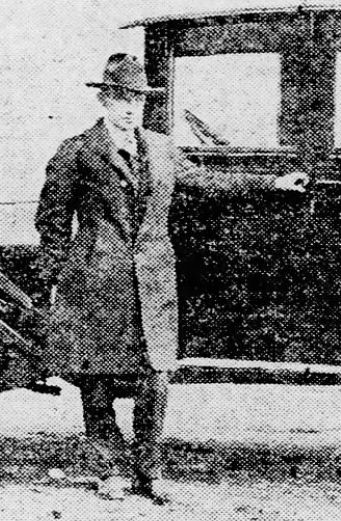
Gaard in 1920

Conrad Gaard (c. 1896 – d. May 19, 1969) was an American minister and a key figure in the emergence of Christian Identity from British Israelism. He was pastor of an Identity congregation in Tacoma, Washington, where he had also had a radio ministry and newsletter. Gaard was the head of the Destiny of America Foundation.

Having been mentored by Gerald L. K. Smith, Gaard travelled throughout the United States and Canada giving lectures on British Israelism and pyramidology. He was one of the first to incorporate the serpent seed doctrine into Christian Identity teaching.

== Background ==
Gaard was the pastor of the Christian Chapel Church in Tacoma, Washington, an Identity congregation. He broadcast over three radio stations, and published a newsletter titled The Broadcaster, formerly titled The Interpreter. He headed the Destiny of America Foundation until his death in 1969.

During the late 1940s, Gaard was a faculty member of the Dayton Theological Seminary in Dayton, Ohio, an Anglo-Israel training center.

Being involved with the Anglo-Saxon Federation of America, Gaard traveled the United States and western Canada giving lectures on British Israelism and pyramidology. In the 1940s and early 1950s, a handful of adherents began to blend antisemitic elements with British Israelism and right-wing extremism as it transformed into Christian Identity.

Gaard was one of the most influential theologians in the early formation of Christian Identity. He was one of the four primary theologians responsible for the emergence of Christian Identity out of British Israelism, along with Wesley Swift, William Potter Gale, and Bertrand Comparet. According to political scientist Michael Barkun, Gaard was among the first to make a sustained presentation of Identity views.

In the 1940s, Gaard was among a number of British Israel organizers who were mentored by Gerald L. K. Smith, along with Bertrand Comparet and San Jacinto Capt. Gaard was in contact with Smith as early as 1946. Smith asked Gaard to address the 1950 convention of the Christian Nationalist Party in Los Angeles. Initially, Gaard did not feel he had the time, considering his broadcasting and publishing commitments. He did eventually capitulate and was advertised as a "Lecturer of influence".

== Beliefs ==
=== Origin theory ===
Conrad Gaard's origin teaching considered the serpent a pre-Adamite "beast of the field". Although the assumption is that the serpent fathered Cain through adultery with Eve, Gaard considered that made little difference since Cain married a pre-Adamite anyway, resulting in a "mongrel, hybrid race". In Gaard's view, the original sin then was miscegenation. This line was continued through Ham, allowing Cain's line to survive the flood. This continued when Judah had offspring with a Canaanite woman. This line was carried off into Babylonian exile where they joined with "the various Edomite-Amalekite Shelanite-Canaanite elements of the serpent race" which, "under Satanic inspiration they were united in one Conspiratorial group, which became known as the 'Diaspora,' or Dispersion, of the 'Jews'".

Gaard's teaching on serpent seed doctrine first appeared in the 1960s, in his book Spotlight on the Great Conspiracy. In it, he expanded on ideas presented in A Short History of Esau-Edom in Jewry, written by Vancouver Anglo-Israelite C. F. Parker, who had himself taken ideas from William Cameron, Howard Rand, and David Davidson. In his serpent seed theory, Gaard ties the emergence of the Illuminati to the "Dragon Cult", representing the serpent's seedline. This leads to a hidden hand conspiracy of Khazar-Zionists fighting against the "Occidental Constitutionalism" of America's founders.

=== Eschatology ===
Gaard's teachings on eschatology rejected amillennialism and presented a combination of elements from postmillennialism and premillennialism. He believed sin would continue until things were as in Noah's generation, and that Christ would return prior to a millennial reign on Earth under God's law. Gaard rejected the idea of a secret rapture of the Church, teaching that the Church would be saved in the Great Tribulation, as opposed to being saved from it. This is why many Christian Identity adherents are survivalists.

Ultimately, in Gaard's eschatology, the "remnant of Israel" made up of white Christians will defeat the conspiracy of the serpent in an apocalyptic battle.

== Works ==
- God's Kingdom Plan Revealed in the Scriptures
- Spotlight on the Great Conspiracy (1955)
