= Serpent seed =

Belief the serpent mated with Eve

The serpent entwines itself around the body of Eve; it whispers in her ear, enticing her to eat the forbidden fruit.

The doctrine of the serpent seed, also known as the dual-seedline or two-seedline doctrine, is a controversial belief in some fringe Christian or other Abrahamic religious movements that interprets the biblical account of the fall of man as follows: the Serpent mated with Eve in the Garden of Eden, and the offspring of their union was Cain. Proponents of this doctrine believe this event resulted in the creation of two races of people: the wicked descendants of the Serpent, who were destined for damnation, and the righteous descendants of Adam, who were destined to have eternal life. The doctrine frames human history as a conflict between these two races in which the descendants of Adam will eventually triumph over the descendants of the Serpent.

The idea that Eve mated with the Serpent was put forth by Valentinus (100–160) and was condemned as heresy by Irenaeus (c. 180) in Against Heresies. Other early versions of this idea appeared in medieval Jewish literature in Pirkei De-Rabbi Eliezer, written in the 8th century. However, this source does not contain any description of the belief that a pervasive "serpent seed" existed later on—it merely describes the origin of Cain's evil.

The serpent seed doctrine was brought into teachings of British Israelism by Russel Kelso Carter (1849–1928). Teachers of Christian Identity theology, which branched off from British Israelism, preached the doctrine during the early twentieth century and promoted it within the Ku Klux Klan, Aryan Nations, the American Nazi Party, and other white supremacist organizations. Some adherents of the doctrine use it to justify antisemitism or racism by claiming that Jews or members of non-white races are the descendants of Cain and the Serpent, who they variably interpret to be Satan or an intelligent non-human creature which lived before Adam and Eve.

Serpent seed teaching comes in several different forms. William M. Branham (1909–1965), Arnold Murray (1929–2014), Wesley A. Swift (1913–1970), and Sun Myung Moon (1920–2012) played important roles in spreading different versions of the doctrine among members of their respective groups throughout the 20th century. Around the world, there are millions of adherents of the serpent seed doctrine within Branhamism and the Unification Church. In 2000, there were an estimated 50,000 adherents of it within Christian Identity. The Anti-Defamation League and various Christian apologetics organizations have denounced racist versions of the serpent seed teaching by claiming that they are incompatible with the teachings of traditional Christianity, and they have accused promoters of them of exacerbating racial divisions by spreading hate.

== Doctrine ==
Various nuanced forms of the serpent seed doctrine have been developed over time. In its general form, it explains the biblical account of the fall of man by stating that the serpent mated with Eve in the Garden of Eden and the offspring of their union was Cain. It claims that Abel and his younger brother Seth were the offspring produced by Eve's relations with Adam. This resulted in two races of people: the wicked descendants of the Serpent who are destined for damnation and the righteous descendants of Adam who are destined to have eternal life. The doctrine frames human history as a conflict between these two races in which the descendants of Adam will eventually triumph over the descendants of Cain and the Serpent.

Genesis 3:15 is cited by proponents in support of the doctrine.

"I will put enmity between you and the woman, and between your offspring and her offspring; he shall bruise your head, and you shall bruise his heel."

— Genesis 3:15 (ESV)

Variations of the doctrine claim that the Serpent's descendants have no souls because they are partially descended from animals and are therefore predestined for damnation. The seedline may be seen as non-Europeans, Jews, or Africans. The identity of the serpent and the serpent's seed varies between groups. Some groups see the serpent as Satan himself, while others incorporate pre-Adamite views that the serpent was a non-human creature whose creation predated the creation of Adam.

Some groups are markedly militant on the subject because of their millennial teachings, and as a result, they believe that at the end of days, a final battle will be fought in which the pure race will triumph over the impure race.

== Mainstream Christianity ==
Mainstream Christianity rejects the serpent seed view. Many different Christian groups offer systematic rebuttals of the doctrine. For example, the Christian Apologetics and Research Ministry points to Genesis 4:1 in order to refute the doctrine. Because the biblical record explicitly names Adam as the father of Cain, the teaching of the serpent seed is considered incompatible with the Protestant teaching of Biblical infallibility.

Now Adam knew Eve his wife, and she conceived and bore Cain...

— Genesis 4:1 (ESV)

Critics argue that the doctrine foments division and fuels racism, which makes it an unhealthy belief which is incompatible with Christianity because the belief itself leads to sin. One Christian apologetics group states, "Although an idea should not be criticized when it is wrongly applied, it is appropriate to condemn an idea when it logically leads to sin. A philosophy that teaches that some races or people are universally satanic, like the serpent seed doctrine, is one such philosophy." Also writing on the topic, Rev. John Brisby stated, "The Serpent's Seed doctrine is the hallmark of most radical hate groups today. Whether it involves neo-Nazis, right-wing militias, or one of the many other white supremacist groups, most of them share this doctrine in common. How do they justify their hatred towards Jews, non-whites, and others? They believe that these people are not real people at all!"

Other criticisms of the doctrine point out the theological repercussions of blurring traditional Christianity's interpretation of the doctrine of original sin. The serpent seed doctrine characterizes original sin as a feature of genetic inheritance rather than a spiritual condition. Mainstream Christianity teaches the belief that all human beings are equally sinful before God and incapable of redemption. Through faith in Jesus Christ, individuals can become children of God through adoption. The serpent seed doctrine undermines the basic teachings of Christian conversion by teaching the belief that only individuals who are descended from Adam are the inherent children of God, a belief which classifies them as the only people who do not need to convert to Christianity, while the Serpent's seedline is irredeemable.

== History ==
=== Early teachings ===
Early expression of the idea that Eve mated with the serpent and produced Cain is found in the teachings of Valentinus (100–160), who promoted a doctrine which is similar to the serpent seed doctrine. In his teaching, the serpent was the manifestation of an aeon named Sophia who seduced Eve. The teachings of Valentinus were compiled in the Gnostic Gospel of Philip (c. 350).

First adultery came into being, afterward murder. And he (Cain) was begotten in adultery, for he was the child of the serpent. So he became a murderer, just like his father, and he killed his brother. Indeed, every act of sexual intercourse which has occurred between those who are unlike one another is an act of adultery.

— Gospel of Philip 61:5-10

A similar account is recorded in the Gnostic Apocryphon of John which was authored by the Sethians (c. 180).

Irenaeus recorded a portion of the teaching and denounced it as heresy in his book Against Heresies. Explaining and commenting on the teachings of Valentinus, Irenaeus states:

[They] cunningly devised a scheme to seduce Eve and Adam, by means of the serpent ... this one (Eve) sinned by committing adultery ... Such are the opinions which prevail among these persons, by whom, like the Lernæan hydra, a many-headed beast has been generated from the school of Valentinus.

— Irenaeus, Against Heresies, Book I Chapter XXX: Doctrines of the Ophites and Sethians

=== Medieval Judaism ===
The teaching also appeared in medieval Judaica. In his 1957 book Cain: Son of the Serpent, David Max Eichhorn traces the belief that Cain was the son of the union between the serpent and Eve back to early Jewish Midrashic texts which were composed between 800 CE and 1200 CE. Eichhorn identified rabbis who wrote about the topic, including a 9th-century book titled Pirke De-Rabbi Eliezer and the Zohar. In their version of the serpent seed doctrine, Adam's first wife was Lilith and his second wife was Eve. Lilith became possessed by the spirit of God's wife and rebelled against Adam and became the mother of all demons. Eve was subsequently seduced by the serpent and became the mother of a race of evil men.

The Aramaic text Targum Pseudo-Jonathan contains passages which refer to the serpent seed concept. The targum was referenced by Rabbi Menahem Recanati (1250–1310) in his Perush 'Al ha-Torah. The age of the writing is disputed. A 2006 analysis by Beverly Mortensen dates the Targum Pseudo-Jonathan to the 4th century and she regards it as a manual for kohanim. Gavin McDowell's analyses suggested that the document was created in the early 1200s because it includes excerpts from writings which date back to the 1100s.

In the Targum Pseudo-Jonathan, the serpent is an angelic being who is named Samael.

And the Woman beheld Sammael, the angel of death, and was afraid; yet she knew that the tree was good to eat, and that it was medicine for the enlightenment of the eyes, and desirable tree by means of which to understand. And she took of its fruit, and did eat; and she gave to her husband with her, and he did eat.

— Targum, Pseudo-Jonathan Genesis 3:6

And again, in the Targum Pseudo-Jonathan..

And Adam knew Hava his wife, who had desired the Angel; and she conceived, and bare Kain; and she said, I have acquired a man, the Angel of the Lord.

— Targum, Pseudo-Jonathan Genesis 4:1

So Adam knew his wife Eve/Hava, who desired the Angel (Samael), aka "The Serpent, Satan & The Destroyer" in Judaism & Talmudic Lore. And then she bore Kain. In one account Samael is also believed to be the father of Cain, as well as the partner of Lilith. The relationship between Samael and Lilith is depicted in the Sigil of Baphomet, the official insignia of the Church of Satan.

=== Modern origins in British Israelism ===
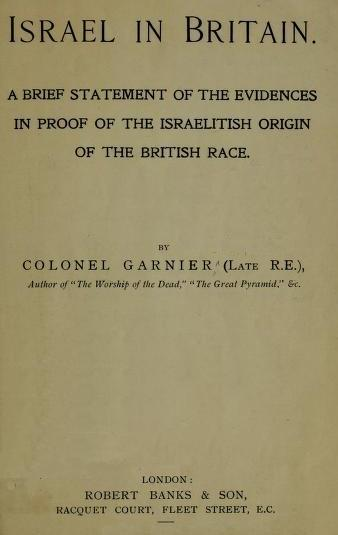
An 1890 book advocating British Israelism. According to the serpent seed doctrine, the Ten Lost Tribes of Israel found their way to Western Europe and Britain, where they became the ancestors of the British and related peoples.

Russel Kelso Carter (1849–1928) was a prominent Church of God (Holiness) minister and a follower of the British Israel teachings of C. A. L. Totten (1851–1908). He became the first preacher of British Israelism to offer a theory on the origin of the serpent's seed. Carter theorized that Cain was the literal Son of the serpent in his 1894 book The Tree of Knowledge. Carter believed that "the tremendous pull of the sexual appetite, aroused by the excited state of the woman" caused humanity's fall in the Garden of Eden. He believed that Satan used the seduction of Eve to destroy God's pure race "at its fountainhead". Carter stopped short of speculating who the descendants of Cain might be. Carter's teachings on the subject were subsequently integrated into the overall teachings of British Israelism and proved to be particularly appealing to members of the Ku Klux Klan and other white supremacists during the 20th century.

In 1875, A. Lester Hoyle wrote a book titled The Pre-Adamite, or who tempted Eve?. In his book, he claimed that multiple creations of races had occurred, but he claimed that only the white race, of which Adam was the father, had been made in God's image and likeness. Hoyle also suggested that Cain was the "mongrel offspring" from the seduction of Eve by "an enticing Mongolian" with whom she had repeated trysts, thus laying the foundation for the white supremacist bio-theology which states that miscegenation is "an abomination".

=== Christian Identity theology ===
It is possible that seedline teaching was integrated into Christian Identity theology by Philip E. J. Monson, leader of the Anglo-Saxon Federation of America in California. Monson published Satan's Seat: The Enemy of Our Race in which he theorized an impure seedline and connected it to the activities of the Catholic Church and the Pope.

Wesley A. Swift (1913–1970), a former recruiter for the Ku Klux Klan and Christian Identity minister, was a student of Monson. Swift accepted the serpent seed doctrine and was instrumental in promoting the teachings among white supremacists in the United States.

Swift was a minister at the Angelus Temple, a church frequently visited by William Branham. Swift later separated and started a new church, Church of Jesus Christ–Christian, which was later renamed Aryan Nations by Swift's successor, Richard Girnt Butler. Swift ordained several ministers who helped him to spread the theology. His lieutenants who helped him to spread the serpent seed teaching included two Nazis, Oren Potito and Neuman Britton, and the prominent KKK leader Connie Lynch. Swift and his fellow white supremacists began to promote the doctrine even more fervently during the desegregation period of the 1950s and 1960s. According to Swift, the descendants of the serpent were "in violation of Divine law when they started to mutate species and mix races." The serpent seed teaching was used to justify racial segregation and the prohibition of interracial marriage.

It was also during the desegregation period when William Branham (1909–1965) and Arnold Murray (1929–2014) first began to promote their versions of the serpent seed doctrine. Branham was the most successful promoter of the serpent seed doctrine, and his version of it was subsequently accepted by millions of his followers. During the desegregation era, a militant form of the doctrine was espoused, especially by Christian Identity groups, because its millennial teachings state that the pure race will wage a final battle against the evil descendants of the serpent in order to destroy them.

== Modern adherents ==
=== William Branham ===
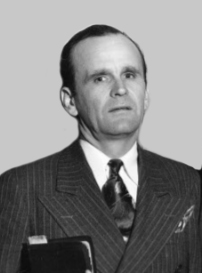
William Branham

William M. Branham (1909–1965), a prominent American Pentecostal minister in the 1940s and 1950s, also promoted the serpent seed doctrine. Branham taught the belief that the serpent had sexual intercourse with Eve and their offspring was Cain. Branham also taught the belief that Cain's modern descendants were masquerading as educated people and scientists, along with the belief that Cain's descendants were "a big religious bunch of illegitimate bastard children" who comprised the majority of society's criminals. He believed that the serpent was the missing link between the chimpanzee and man, and he also speculated that the serpent was possibly a human-like giant. Branham believed that the serpent was transformed into a reptile after it was cursed by God.

According to Steven Hassan, "Branham's sermons lay the foundation to believe that black people are the inferior race." Branham used the term "hybrid" to describe anything he believed to be tainted by the serpent. Branham accused Eve of producing a "hybrid" race, and he provided a way to trace the hybrid line of the Serpent's Seed to Africans and Jews through Ham the biblical progenitor of the African peoples, King Ahab, Judas Iscariot, Roman Catholics, and the future Antichrist.

Now, Noah and his sons, which come out, Ham, Shem, and Japheth, come out in the righteous line. How did the [serpent's] seed ever get over? The [serpent's] seed come over in the ark, just like it did in the beginning, through the woman, their wives. They carried the seed of Satan, through the ark, just as Eve packed the seed of Satan, to give birth to Cain, through the woman. ... Notice this now. And out of there, then, come Ham, Ham with his wife, and them. He had a curse put on him.

— William Branham, The Serpent's Seed, September 28, 1958

What good would a white woman want to have a baby by a colored man making him a mulatto child? It's not sensible. ... If I was a colored man, or a brown man, or a yellow man, or a red man, I would be just as happy about it. Yes, sir. I sure would. That's the way that my Maker wanted me and that's the way I am. Right. Why does man want to tamper with anything for? When man gets into it, he ruins it. Let it alone the way God made it. Let a man be what he is; by the grace of God let him be. But he has to cause great fusses now calling our… causing riots, and big fusses, and everything else across the nations, and across the world just because he wanted to stick his head out about something. That's the ignorance of the man. That's right; hybrid again. Instead of leaving it the way God wants it, he wants to make his own way. He has to do something about it, you know. He has to make his own self a name. God be merciful to him. It's a pitiful thing.

— William Branham, But It Wasn't So From The Beginning, April 11, 1960

God is a segregationalist [sic]. I am too. Any Christian's a segregation. God segregates His people from all the rest of them. They're... They've always been a segregation. He chose a nation. He chooses a people. He is a segregationalist [sic]. He made all nations. But still, a real genuine Christian has to be a segregationalist [sic]. Separating himself from the things of the world and everything, and come into one purpose, Jesus Christ.

— William Branham, Who Do You Say This Is?, 27 December 1964

Michael Barkun wrote that Branham was the most significant proponent of the racial teaching outside the Christian Identity movement and he directly influenced its theology. Branham's teachings on serpent seed was a particularly significant contributor to the development of Identity's view that the Jews are the seed of the Devil through Cain. Branham's 1958 introduction of the serpent seed teaching coincided with Wesley Swift's introduction of the belief in the demonic origin of the Jews through the serpent, both beliefs were introduced in 1958.

Branham related a story in which he privately discussed the belief that blacks were descended from apes as early as 1929. Branham publicly hinted his belief in the serpent seed doctrine as early as 1953. He first began to teach serpent seed in 1958 at the height of racial unrest in the United States. Prof. Douglas Weaver believed that Branham may have become acquainted with the serpent seed doctrine through his Baptist roots. Branham was baptized and ordained at a First Pentecostal Baptist Church which was pastored by Roy Davis, a founding member and later Imperial Wizard of the second Ku Klux Klan. Branham may also have made contact with Kentucky churches which espoused Daniel Parker's two-seed doctrine. Professor Jon Schamber also reviewed Branham's serpent seed teachings and the role which he played in spreading the doctrine. Schamber also connected Branham's serpent seed doctrine to Russel Carter's teachings which were integrated into Christian Identity Theology and Daniel Parker's Two-Seed Theology. The CBC connected William Branham to the Ku Klux Klan during a 2017 investigation. Branham's embrace of the serpent seed doctrine alienated most of the members of his Pentecostal audience. According to Pearry Green, adherents of the broader Pentecostal movement consider Branham's version of the serpent seed doctrine repugnant and in their point of view, it was the "filthy doctrine ... that ruined his ministry." No other mainstream Christian group held a similar view; Branham was widely criticized for spreading the doctrine, but his followers view the doctrine as one of his greatest revelations.

There are millions of adherents of William Branham's serpent seed teachings. Voice of God Recordings reported that about two million people subscribe to Branham's teachings through the William Branham Evangelical Association. His followers continue to promote the doctrine and as a result, they have made international news for their racial views in relation to the teaching. According to Weaver, Branham's followers are very proud of his serpent seed teaching, believing it to be "his most original revelation". Many of his followers are unaware of the doctrine's true origin. When they are confronted with the accusations of racism, some of his followers deny the veracity of the accusation that the teaching of the serpent seed doctrine has any connection to white supremacy or racism. According to the Southern Poverty Law Center, "Not all Branham churches are racist or embrace the anti-race-mixing position," "but the theology clearly invites racism."

In 2014, Pastor Donny Reagan made news in the United States for promoting Branham's racial teachings. Several news outlets referred to Reagan as the "most racist pastor in America." Kacou In 2017, Philippe, a leader of Branham's followers in Africa, was arrested and sentenced to one year in prison for violating hate speech laws in multiple African nations after he preached the belief that blacks should be submissive towards whites. Philippe stated that the decolonisation of Africa was a sin, and he also stated that Africans could only prosper when they were in servitude to Europeans.

=== Arnold Murray ===
Televangelist Arnold Murray (1929–2014), founder of The Shepherd's Chapel and a prominent televangelist, taught the serpent seed doctrine. He accepted the belief that the Jews (Kingdom of Judah) were descended from Adam through Seth, as the Bible describes. However, he held the view that the Kenites were the offspring of Cain. He also believed that they infiltrated the northern Kingdom of Israel. Murray's teachings are disputed by CARM, the CRI and other Protestant apologetics ministries.

According to the Southern Poverty Law Center, Murray was ordained a minister in 1958 by Roy Gillaspie and Kenneth Goff, two members of the KKK and early preachers of Christian Identity. Until at least 1978, Murray served as a leader in Gillaspie's Church of Jesus Christ–Christian organization, which had been founded by Wesley Swift. Murray was also connected to Goff's Soldiers of the Cross Training Institute where Christian Identity was taught. Dan Gayman, the most prominent Christian Identity Leader in the 1980s, attended the institute.

Explaining his beliefs in a 1979 Shepherd's Bible, Murray explained that the Kenites were serpent's offspring who "slipped in among the Jewish people in Jerusalem and claim to be God's chosen people, when in fact they are of Lucifer." Connecting the Kenites to the modern Jewish people, Murray explained that "in 1967 … Jerusalem fell to the Kenites during the 6 day war". In another sermon, Murray said that the Kenites "are responsible for the slaying of Christ." Although his teachings portrayed Jews as descendants of Lucifer, Murray insisted that his beliefs were not anti-semitic.

=== Christian Identity movement ===
Aryan Nations logo

Adherents of the white supremacist theology which is known as two-seedline Christian Identity do not believe that the Jews are the chosen people of God because in their view, only white people are the descendants of Adam and hence, only white people are the chosen people of God. According to their belief, members of all other races (specifically non-white people) are descended from Cain and thus, they are descended from Satan, especially Jews and blacks. This belief was popularized by Wesley A. Swift (Church of Jesus Christ–Christian), Conrad Gaard, Dan Gayman (Church of Israel) and William Potter Gale among others. The opposing faction is called One-Seedline Christian Identity because adherents of it hold the view that all people are descended from Adam, but they believe that only Aryans (meaning Northern Europeans) are God's chosen people. Christian Identity followers "believe that they are in or are about to enter into the time of the Tribulation, a great battle between good and evil in which they will take part."

Groups which adhere to Christian Identity theology include the Aryan Freedom Network, Aryan Nations, the Christian Defense League, and the Ku Klux Klan. In 2000, the Southern Poverty Law Center estimated that there were 50,000 adherents of Christian Identity theology in the United States.

=== Unification Church ===
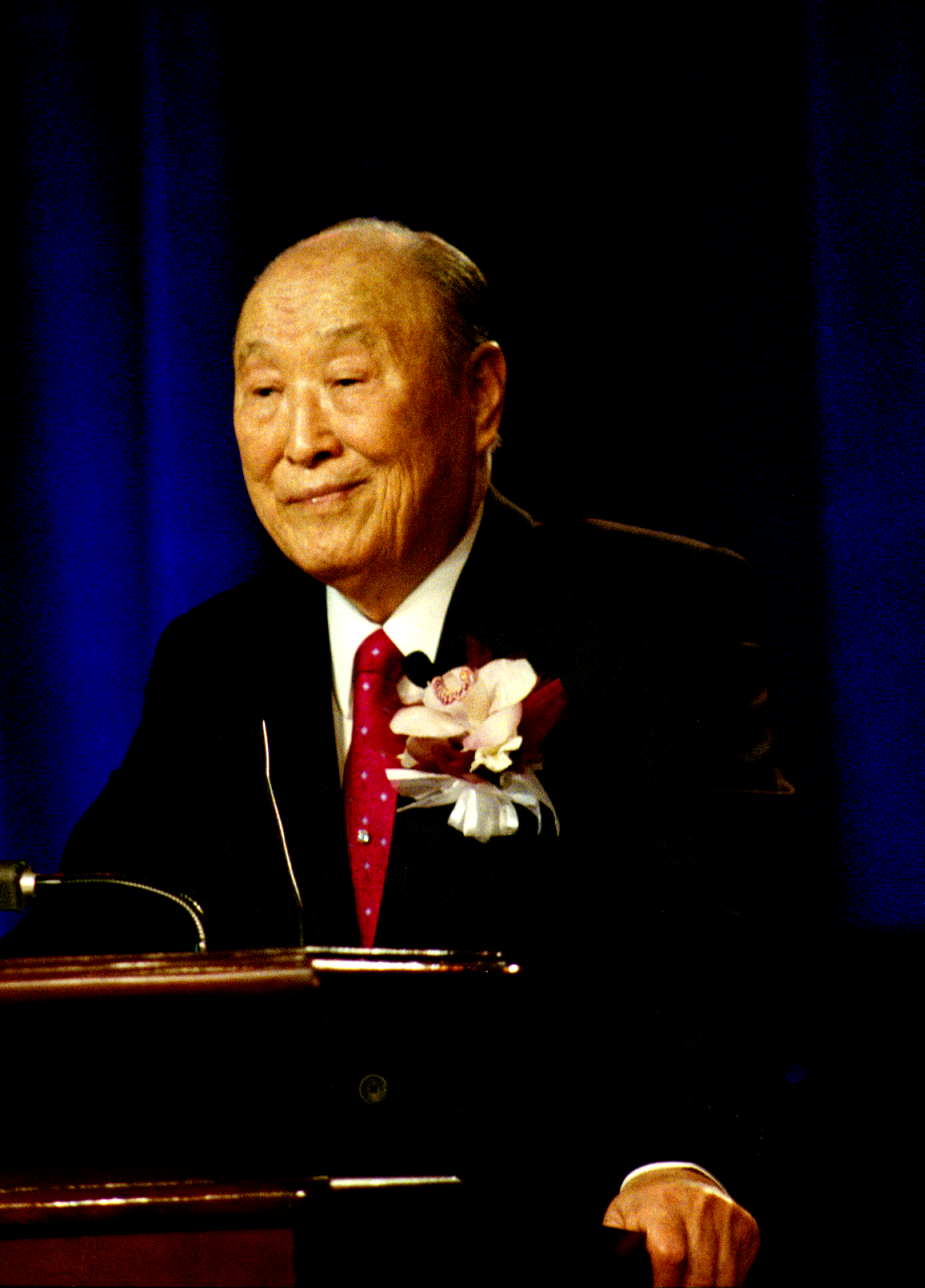
Sun Myung Moon

The Unification Church has taught a version of the serpent seed doctrine since at least 1961. Sun Myung Moon taught the belief that the Fall of Man occurred when Eve was sexually seduced by Satan, and since then, the human bloodline has been contaminated. Moon believed that both Cain and Abel were physically descended from Adam and Eve, but taught that "Cain is in the position of Satan's son". Moon referred to secular society and religious people outside of the Unification Church as "Cain people". Members of the Unification Church believe that through their Holy Marriage Blessing Ceremony, married couples are removed from the lineage of Adam and Eve and grafted into God's sinless lineage as the adopted children of their new Adam: Sun Myung Moon. The first of these ceremonies occurred in 1961.

Adam and Eve fell by the sin of illicit love, a transgression that violated God's ideal of true love. Prior to the fall, when they were constrained by the commandment [not to eat the fruit], Adam and Eve were in an imperfect state, that is, in their growing period. The archangel Lucifer, symbolized by the serpent, tempted Eve, and she spiritually fell with him. She then tempted Adam to eat the fruit before the time was ripe, and they fell physically. ... By this principle, God divided fallen Adam and Eve into two through their two children. Cain represented Satan, and Abel represented sinless Adam. Hence God placed Abel, the second son, in the internal position. Abel represented the second love between Adam and Eve, which contained fewer evil elements, while Cain was the fruit of the first love. God took Abel because Adam and Eve's relationship was more principled than the first relationship between Eve and the archangel. ... The religious people whom God has blessed take the role of Abel, while the secular people who do not know God and may have grudges against religion are in the role of Cain.

— Sun Myung Moon, World Scripture II, pp. 248, 256, 1139

In World Scripture, the Unification Church quotes passages from the Koran, the Midrash Rabbah, the Bahir, the Stromata and Sigmund Freud's writings in support of its version of the Serpent seed doctrine. Moon attended many different Christian churches during the 1930s and 1940s in both Korea and Japan, and was exposed to British missionaries and Pentecostals.

P'ikareum is a related ritual which is performed by members of several Korean new religious movements, in which a female devotee has sex with the male leader (who claims to be the messiah) in order to purify her descendants from inherited sin. The purpose of this ritual is to undo the original sin, which (as in the classic serpent seed doctrine) was believed to have been committed when Eve had sex with the serpent. British religious scholar George Chryssides also noted that there were cases in which the messianic leader was a female and the neophyte was a male. The person who is so initiated will then have intercourse with his or her spouse, and the purity which is acquired from the messianic leader will be transmitted to both the spouse and the spouse's progeny. The most notable Korean new religious movement to have faced allegations of performing p'ikareum is the early Unification Church of Sun Myung Moon; however, Chryssides notes that, aside from the use of language which involves the purifying of sinful bloodlines, there is no actual evidence that this ritual occurs within the Unification movement.

== See also ==
- Curse and mark of Cain
- Curse of Ham

== Bibliography ==
- Aho, James A. (2014). The Politics of Righteousness: Idaho Christian Patriotism. Seattle, Washington: University of Washington Press. ISBN 978-0-295-80106-3.
- Barkun, Michael (1997). Religion and the Racist Right: The Origins of the Christian Identity Movement. University of North Carolina Press. ISBN 978-0-8078-4638-4.
- Byron, John (2011). Cain and Abel in Text and Tradition: Jewish and Christian Interpretations of the First Sibling Rivalry. BRILL. ISBN 978-9004192522.
- Kydd, Ronald A. N. (1998). Healing through the Centuries: Models for Understanding. Hendrickson Publishers, Inc. ISBN 9789004192522.
- Lee, O. Max (1962). Daniel Parker's Doctrine of the Two Seeds (PDF) (Th. M. thesis). Louisville, Kentucky: Southern Baptist Theological Seminary.
- Moriarty, Michael (1992). The New Charismatics. Zondervan. ISBN 978-0-310-53431-0.
- Piepkorn, Arthur Carl (1977). Profiles in Belief: The Religious Bodies of the United States and Canada. Vol. 2. San Francisco, California: Harper & Row Publishers. ISBN 0-06-066582-3.
- Schamber, Jon F. (2000). Mystical Anti-Semitism and the Christian Identity Movement (PDF). Stockton, CA: University of the Pacific.
- Unification Church (2008). Hwan Kwak, Chung (ed.). World Scripture II (PDF). Universal Peace Federation.
- Valeri, Robin Maria; Borgeson, Kevin (2009). Terrorism in America. Sudbury, Massachusetts: Jones and Bartlett Publishers. ISBN 978-0-7637-5524-9.
- Weaver, C. Douglas (2000). The Healer-Prophet: William Marrion Branham (A study of the Prophetic in American Pentecostalism). Mercer University Press. ISBN 978-0-865-54710-0.
