= Michael W. Ryan =

American murderer (1948–2015)

- Born: August 3, 1948
- Died: May 24, 2015 (aged 66); Tecumseh State Correctional Institution, Nebraska, US
- Other name: "The King"
- Status: Deceased
- Allegiance: Posse Comitatus; Christian Identity
- Convictions: First degree murder Second degree murder
- Penalty: Death
- Accomplices: Dennis Ryan (son); Timothy Haverkamp; James Haverkamp; John David Andreas

Details
- Killed: 2

Michael Wayne Ryan (August 3, 1948 – May 24, 2015) was an American convicted murderer.

== Early life ==
Ryan was born on August 3, 1948, in Nebraska. Having dropped out of high school just short of what would have been his graduation, he began working odd jobs to support a wife and his children, but never stayed at one for very long. By his mid-20s, began working as a truck driver, the one job he was purported to enjoy, until a back injury forced him out of the cab and back home where he started regularly using marijuana.

== Crimes ==
=== Background ===
Ryan was the leader of a small, racist, anti-government group that occupied a compound near Rulo, Nebraska, in the early 1980s. The group had loose ties to the Posse Comitatus, with links to the Christian Identity movement. Some of the main teachings within the group revolved around supremacy of the white race, antisemitism, homophobia, the downfall and hatred of "race traitors", drug addicts and non-European-descended American citizens, and a general distrust of all established earthly authority, especially governments and law enforcement. One of the group's core messages was, more or less, that the white race was "chosen" by God and all other human beings are the children of Satan, via the so-called "serpent seed" theory. Many of the recruited followers were disillusioned farmers from the local area with seemingly nothing to lose, who were easily influenced after having had lost money or property due to economic strains at the time.

For months, he and his followers committed burglaries under the cover of night, reselling the items to financially support the group. They stockpiled weapons and supplies believing they would be needed during an imminent battle of Armageddon, assumed to occur in the form of a race war.

=== Murder of Luke Stice ===
Ryan was originally arrested in 1985 after reports and a criminal investigation indicated that he had abused and killed five-year-old Luke Stice. Ryan had decided that Stice was a "mongrel, the seed of Satan" earlier that year. Ryan began to physically and encourage the sexual abuse of Stice. He had repeatedly slammed the boy against walls, threatened to shoot him and using his mouth as an ashtray. He also made Stice perform sex acts with Thimm and his father, Rick Stice, and Thimm to perform sex acts on Stice.

At some point in March 1985, Ryan had shoved Stice several times, one of which caused him to strike his head against a cabinet knocking him unconscious. Stice died the night of March 25, 1985. Ryan then forced his father to bury his son in an unmarked grave.

=== Murder of James Thimm ===
Following the death of Luke Stice, Ryan and one of his wives went to Kansas City on a honeymoon, leaving two followers - and future co-defendants - in charge. Rick Stice, father of Luke, had escaped from the compound while they were away and, upon returning and learning of Stice's escape, blamed Thimm and had him chained to a horse trailer in a building on the compound. Stice had eventually returned, but escaped a second time while in town being forced to cash a social security check.

James Thimm (age 25) was beaten, whipping about the back and chest, had his fingertips shot off, was skinned alive, legs broken, and raped with a shovel and pickaxe handles before finally being stomped to death.

== Trial ==
Ryan was tried by a jury in Omaha, Nebraska after a change of venue. In April 1986, the jury convicted him of first degree murder; in October 1986, the court sentenced Ryan to death. He attempted to appeal his sentence, but the appeal was denied.

He claimed to be in direct contact with God and vowed to spend his days in prison rewriting the Bible, but he later recanted both statements.

== Death ==
Michael Ryan died of brain cancer while on death row in Tecumseh State Correctional Institution on May 24, 2015.
