= Kingdom Identity Ministries =

Christian church that promotes white supremacy

- Founder: Mike Hallimore
- Ideology: Christian Identity
- Political position: Far-right
- Status: active

Kingdom Identity Ministries (KIM) is a self-described "outreach ministry" based in Harrison, Arkansas, which advocates racism, antisemitism, and extreme homophobia. Its website states that it "is an outreach ministry to God's chosen race". It believes that the only true descendants of Abraham, Isaac, and Jacob are those with Germanic, Anglo-Saxon, Celtic, Nordic, or Aryan heritage. It adheres to the white supremacist theology which is known as Christian Identity. The Southern Poverty Law Center considers it "the largest supplier in existence of materials related to Christian Identity".

It primarily functions as a distributor of books, tracts, and audiotapes about Christian identity and offers correspondence courses through its American Institute of Theology. KIM also produces the Herald of Truth radio program which is broadcast on shortwave, satellite, and Internet radio. In addition to Christian Identity material, KIM also circulates other white supremacist material. For example, it sends white supremacist pamphlets to rural communities in Pennsylvania and it funded the distribution of a white power music CD in 2007.

KIM was founded in 1982 by Mike Hallimore and it currently owns the copyright to a number of works on Christian Identity by Bertrand Comparet and Wesley Swift. Hallimore died on July 10, 2021, at his home in Alpena at age 74.
