= Dominick McCausland =

Barrister

Dominick McCausland or Dominick M'Causland LL.D. QC (1806–1873) was an Irish barrister and Christian author.

== Career ==
A barrister by profession, McCausland obtained a BA in law at Trinity College Dublin in 1835 further followed by a doctorate in 1859. He was later appointed as Crown Prosecutor.

== Biblical ethnology ==
McCausland's earliest publications advocate a form of premillennialism. His argument about Biblical prophecy requires the Bible to be a literal historical narrative, and he realised that this was called into question by the difference between the time-scale of Creation in Genesis and the age of the Earth as revealed by geology. His book Sermons in Stone advocates the view that the "days" of Genesis were not twenty-four-hour days but geological ages. McCausland credits Hugh Miller with this theory.

McCausland was an early proponent of pre-adamism. In 1864, McCausland published the first of two works on ethnology, Adam and the Adamite. McCausland sought to harmonise scriptural accuracy with physical science. His argument was that the Book of Genesis refers almost exclusively to only one race, the "Adamic", or Caucasian. Since his premise was to make sure that science and scripture were in agreement, McCausland understood that if Adam were to be the considered "the progenitor of all mankind" then the Biblical account of creation would be inaccurate. But if Adam were to be created as a separate race, superior to previous races, and in the image of God, then that would mean scripture and science were in harmony. McCausland's use of the term "Adamic race" would come to hold important significance in the Christian Identity movement.

To support his theory, McCausland wrote that prehistoric humans had lived before the period of Genesis and that the Hebrew words "Adam" and "Ish," both conventionally translated as "Man," refer to separate and distinct human races. The "Adamite" was a special divine creation whose history was recorded in Genesis; all other races were supposedly incapable of higher thought or cultural development.

McCausland posited that the Flood only affected the area settled by the Adamite race. Since Cain had been expelled from the area, the Cainites survived the Flood, continually moving eastward and ultimately settling China, where their knowledge and skill laid the foundation of Chinese civilization.

In his book The Builders of Babel, McCausland writes that human civilisations evidenced by the ruins of Egypt and Mexico had been created by an extinct "Hamitic race of Babel-builders." He further argues that Jubal and Tubal-cain had founded an Antediluvian civilization in Central Asia. It grew eastward to mix with Cain and the "pre-Adamite savages of China," where it was "stagnated by Mongolian blood."

== Works ==
- The Latter Days of the Jewish Church and Nation (1842)
- The times of the Gentiles as revealed in the Apocalypse (1852)
- Sermons in stone: or scripture confirmed by geology (1857)
- Adam and the Adamite (1864)
- Shinar (1867)
- The Builders of Babel (1874)

== See also ==
- Ethel Bristowe
- Laurence Waddell
- Alexander Winchell
