= The Shepherd's Chapel =

Christian church and broadcast facility

The Shepherd's Chapel is a Christian church and broadcast facility in Gravette, Arkansas. The church was founded by Arnold Benjamin Murray (April 20, 1929 – February 12, 2014), who served as senior pastor until his death. After Murray's death in February 2014, his son Dennis Arnold Murray (July 3, 1952 - December 5, 2025), the former associate pastor, was senior pastor of the church until he died in 2025. Arnold Murray's other son, David Vernon Murray (January 18, 1954 – July 14, 2013), was an associate pastor until his death.

== Broadcasting ==
Since 1985, the Shepherd's Chapel has been broadcasting one-hour televised Bible studies over its satellite network, with its most prominent presence being within the graveyard slot on over 225 broadcast television stations across the United States via paid brokered programming arrangements, along with streaming those programs through their websites and various other providers. It is the largest independent Christian television network in the world. Pastor Murray teaches a "chapter-by-chapter, verse-by-verse study of God's Word; the Bible". Also shown are various documentary programs from a pseudoarcheological Anglo-Israelism perspective. It airs 24 hours a day at their website. According to the Southern Poverty Law Center, the program "has been on the air for at least four decades and is broadcast in nearly every major and mid-size U.S. city".

== Doctrine ==
Part of the Shepherd's Chapel's doctrine follows British Israelism, as well as a version of the "serpent seed" doctrine that identifies a "Kenite" lineage of people who are descended from Cain who slew Abel. Arnold Murray taught a version of pre-adamism, suggesting that "those who served God are predestined to salvation, while those who served Satan are cursed with free will and the opportunity to choose God or Satan in this lifetime."

Murray taught a form of Modalism rather than orthodox trinitarianism. In this teaching, God exists as one rather than three distinct persons, and appears in different forms (or "modes") as YHVH, Yashua, and the Holy Spirit.

== Criticism ==
A 2008 study by the Southern Poverty Law Center's Intelligence Report examined the church and its roots in the Christian Identity movement. According to the SPLC report, Murray publicly disavowed racism, although he frequently identified the "Kenites" (descendants of Cain) as a minority within the Tribe of Judah, despite Murray's objection to the generalization.

Christian Apologetics and Research Ministry has criticized Murray's teachings because he did not teach a pre-tribulation rapture doctrine.

Murray responded to criticism of his positions on the Trinity, racism, serpent seed, and Kenites through the Shepherd's Chapel's website. He also addressed questions of qualifications and his relationship to Christian Identity preacher Roy Gillaspie.
