= P'ikareum =

Religious practice of Unification church

P'ikareum (Korean: 피가름 or 피갈음: "blood purification" or "blood exchange") is a controversial religious practice in some new religious movements of Korea. As defined by British religious scholar George Chryssides, the practice consists "of a female neophyte engaging in ritual sexual intercourse with the messianic leader [of the movement], in order to restore – either literally or symbolically – the sexual purity of the woman". Chryssides also notes that there were cases where the messianic leader was female and the neophyte male. The person so initiated will then have intercourse with his or her spouse, and the purity acquired from the messianic leader will be transmitted to both the spouse and the progeny. The spelling p'ikareum was used in McCune–Reischauer transliteration until 2000; however, it is also spelled p'ikareun, as well as pigareum in modern-day Revised Romanization.

== Unification Church ==
The practice is feasibly justified by a theology, popularized by the Unification movement but already present in previous Korean new religions, outlined as follows. Assuming that the original sin was in fact illicit sexual intercourse between Lucifer and Eve, therefore contaminating the entire lineage of humanity, a woman's sexual union with a pure messianic leader, and then her husband, could purify her lineage. However, according to Chryssides in 1991, no hard evidence (despite several testimonials) suggests that p'ikareum was ever performed by Sun Myung Moon and his early Unification Church. Chryssides notes that "none of the sources which attribute this practice to the UC can claim to be first-hand sources, and the UC's founder-members emphatically deny such allegations". Chryssides also believe that p'ikareum in some accounts was confused with ritual nudity, practised in some ceremonies by Korean new religious movements, including some Moon had contacts with in his early years, to claim that members had achieved perfect purity.

Moon was arrested various times in 1950s Korea, in some cases reportedly for sexual rituals or orgies of this nature. In 1993, a Moon ex-follower published a memoir that described Moon's scandalous relationships engaging in p'ikareum with women in his early 1950s ministry in Korea; the author later rescinded these statements, though several other ex-members from that era corroborated them, including Moon's first wife. At least one researcher, a Finnish critical ex-member of the Church, Kirsti L. Nevalainen, also affirms these accusations. Shortly after Moon's death, an ex-member and alleged former lover also corroborated this in 2013, claiming to have birthed Moon's illegitimate son in 1965.

== Historical origins ==
Where Chryssides and Nevalainen (who cites other critics of the Unification movement) agree is that p'ikareum was not a fictional invention devised by the anti-cult movement but was indeed practiced within a group of Korean new religious movements derived from Protestantism in the 1930s and known as "Jesus Churches," whose progenitor was the Holy Lord Church founded by Kim Seongdo. One schism of the Holy Lord Church was the "Inside Belly Church" (Bokjunggyo, Korean 복중교), whose name derived from the false pregnancy of the founder and leader Ho Ho-Bin, who claimed she will become the mother of the future messiah. Other churches in this group included the Israel Monastery, founded by Kim Baek Moon, and the Wilderness Church, the latter possibly a name given by outsiders to a loosely organized network of devotees recognizing Pak Wol-yong as the messiah. Which groups and to what extent practised p'ikareum is unclear, although several clues point to Kim Baek Moon and Pak Wol-yong.

Others mention the preachers Hwang Gukju (황국주) and Jeong Deukeun (정득은) as originators of the practice. Hwang, who claimed to be the second coming of Jesus, led a schism from Wonsan Sinhaksan (원산신학산), a movement created by Baek Nam-Ju (백남주) and influenced by the ideas of Emanuel Swedenborg. Most of the Jesus Churches were located in what became North Korea and disappeared after the Korean War.

== Alternative explanations ==
Discussions about p'ikareum did not disappear. Apart from the continuing controversy about its alleged practice in the Unification Church, in 1957 Korean journalist Kim Gyeongrae published several articles and a book tracing the roots of p'ikareum to Kim Baek Moon and the Israel Monastery and claiming, offering some evidence, that it was practised by what was at that time the largest Christian new religious movement in Korea, the Olive Tree founded by Park Tae-Seon (1915–1990). The Victory Altar, an offshoot of the Olive Tree, was also accused of having practised p'ikareum in its early days.

== See also ==
- Cult
- Serpent seed
