= Bertrand Comparet =

Christian Identity proponent, 1900-1983

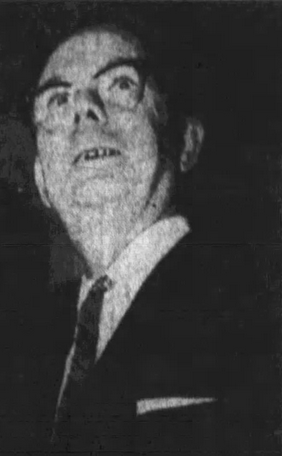
Comparet in 1960

Bertrand Lewis Comparet (c. 1900–1983 (Note: Some sources indicate birth year as 1900, others as 1901)) was an American lawyer and activist who came to be an influential figure in the development of the Christian Identity movement.

== Early life ==
Bertrand Comparet was born in San Diego.

Early in life, he was involved in debate. While in high school in 1919, he won the silver medal in the championship of the Southern California Debating League. After high school, he attended Stanford, where he was also a member of the debate team.

After being educated at Stanford, he became a lawyer. He acted as deputy district attorney of San Diego county from 1926 to 1932 and as deputy city attorney of San Diego from 1942 to 1947.

== Christian Identity ==
Comparet joined with Wesley Swift to form the Anglo Saxons Christian Congregation. Swift served as president, with Comparet as vice president. The congregation began meeting in 1945, but was not incorporated until 1948. That same year, Comparet also incorporated "Dr. Wesley Swift's Ministry, Inc." of which he and Swift were directors.

Comparet served as lawyer for several Christian Identity organizations, including the Christian Defense League. He was also involved with the Christian Nationalist Crusade. In the 1954 election, Comparet provided legal representation to the Christian Nationalist Party to conduct a write-in campaign for Douglas MacArthur for president and Senator Jack B. Tenney for vice-president, with the hope that the Republican and Democrat candidates would be so close, neither would have a majority, leading to a vote in the House of Representatives, which could then elect MacArthur.

When Marcellus Baxter was tried for selling academic degrees, Comparet represented him, with the defense that the degree was not being sold but rather conferred. The course and instruction was sold, while degree was conferred upon completion of the course, which was on the honor system. Ultimately, Baxter pleaded guilty and received two years probation.

Following the 1964 arrest of Christian Defense League member William H. Garland for weapons charges, Comparet handled his legal defense.

Comparet provided representation for members of the Minutemen militia group. In 1964, he represented Harold Schlapia who was found with 11 rifles and 20,000 rounds of ammunition in his car. He was charged with carrying a concealed weapon. In 1965, Comparet handled the defense of Dennis Patrick Mower, a minister and Minuteman member, who stood trial on charges related to the illegal transfer of an automatic weapon.

== Beliefs and ministry ==
Comparet was part of Christian Identity's emergence from British Israelism. He taught that the Jews had never been Israelites, but were instead Canaanites who intermarried with Israelites. He later taught a twist on the Khazar theory by proposing that the Edomite Jews were the ancestors of the Khazars.

Comparet also taught a pre-Adamism that resembled that of Charles Carroll in which the serpent was black pre-Adamite.
