= Buckner H. Payne =

American clergyman and pamphleteer

- Born: Buckner Harrison Payne; August 10, 1799
- Died: June 1, 1883 (aged 83); Davidson County, Tennessee, U.S.
- Resting place: Mount Olivet Cemetery
- Other name: Ariel
- Occupations: Clergyman, publisher
- Known for: Ariel: or the Ethnological Origin of the Negro

Colonel Buckner H. Payne (August 10, 1799 − June 1, 1883) was an American clergyman, publisher and pamphleteer, labelled a racist by posterity. Under the pseudonym of Ariel, Payne authored a racist pamphlet, offering a counter-argument to the Curse of Ham, suggesting instead that blacks did not descend from Ham (Cham) (and thus not from Adam and Eve), and that blacks had no soul.

Payne was "at one time considered the greatest logician in the South." After his death, Payne's work continued to influence racist authors.

== Early life ==
Buckner H. Payne was born on August 10, 1799.

== Career ==
Payne was a clergyman and publisher. He was also a member of Payne, James & Co.

Under the pseudonym of Ariel, Payne was the author of Ariel: or the Ethnological Origin of the Negro, an 1867 racist pamphlet about blacks. In it, he suggested that blacks did not descend from Ham, son of Noah, and thus did not descend from Adam and Eve. Instead, he argued that they were Pre-Adamite and they descended from an animal on Noah's Ark. As a result, he rejected the Curse of Ham, and suggested that they had no soul.

Payne's pamphlet "created much talk." His ideas challenged the status quo of White Supremacy, which rested upon the Curse of Ham. Shortly after its publication, Robert A. Young, a minister of the Methodist Episcopal Church, South, published a response based on scientific arguments. Meanwhile, a literate former slave from Georgia, Harrison Berry, dismissed the pamphlet as confused and misguided. Nevertheless, Payne was "at one time considered the greatest logician in the South."

Payne was falsely accused of murder in 1868. His case went to the Tennessee Supreme Court.

According to his obituaries, Payne predicted the assassination of President James A. Garfield one year before it happened. He also predicted the smallpox epidemic in 1880, which occurred in 1883. Additionally, he predicted his own death for the last day of May 1883.

== Decline, death and legacy ==
Payne was interned in an asylum in Davidson County, Tennessee in 1879. He died poor and blind in 1889, at the age of eighty-four. He was buried in a lumber square box without screws at Mount Olivet Cemetery in Nashville, Tennessee.
