= Christian Defense League =

1960s–1970s US white supremacist activist group

The Christian Defense League was founded as a white supremacist activist organization in California, and it later moved to Louisiana. According to the Anti-Defamation League, it also had a paramilitary function.

Although who actually founded the organization is disputed, under James K. Warner, it moved to Baton Rouge, Louisiana where it merged with the New Christian Crusade Church.

== History ==
The initial history of the organization is unclear due to contradictory accounts. According to Bertrand Comparet and Richard Girnt Butler, they founded the organization. William Potter Gale claimed that he had founded the CDL along with San Jacinto Capt sometime between 1957 and 1962, later bringing in Butler and Comparet.

Butler served as the national director from 1962 to 1965. Gale, Swift, and Comparet all served on the board of the organization.

An introductory mailing for the Christian Defense League led with the following:

The NAACP represents the negro, the ADL represents the Jews; who represents you--the white Christian?

Following the death of Wesley Swift, Butler took over as the head of Church of Jesus Christ–Christian and moved it to Idaho, leaving the leadership of the CDL to James K. Warner. Warner had previous associations with the National Socialist White People's Party, as well as Odinism. When he moved to Los Angeles, he initially associated with neo-Nazi groups, but he ultimately converted to Christian Identity. Under Warner, the CDL moved to Baton Rouge, Louisiana where it merged with the New Christian Crusade Church. This is where most of its paramilitary activity occurred.

The CDL briefly received national attention in 1978 when it demanded NBC cancel the miniseries Holocaust. Warner threatened picketing and litigation and called the series "Zionist propaganda", claiming that NBC was run by "Zionist Jews". This demand was ignored and the group then demanded "equal time" in the form of 3 hours of prime-time views to present their revisionist history of WWII, which NBC also ignored.
