= Kinism =

Segregationist religious movement

Kinism is the belief that Christians have a duty to prefer the members of one's family – and by extension, one's ethnic group – and should preserve racial differences in "racially homogeneous families, congregations, and in distinctive social and perhaps even national spheres." The term is often used to refer to a "movement of anti-immigrant, 'Southern heritage' separatists who splintered off from Christian Reconstructionism to advocate that God's intended order is 'loving one's own kind' by separating people along 'tribal and ethnic' lines to live in large, extended-family groups."

== History and ideology ==
The Kinist ideology emerged in either the 1990s or the early 2000s.

Some kinists were associated with the Neo-Confederate League of the South; one of its members stated that "The non-white immigration invasion is the 'Final Solution' to the 'white' problem of the South, White race genocide. We believe the Kinism statement proposes a biblical solution for all races. If whites die out, the South will no longer exist."

=== Doctrinal beliefs ===
Kinists claim that the Bible prohibits racial integration. The Anti-Defamation League notes that "Despite having an explicit, racially centric set of beliefs, Kinists often deny the claim that they are racists." The movement is loosely organized and as a result, it does not have a single leader; as of 2003, there were various kinist activists in the United States, many of them had an Internet presence which consisted of websites and blogs.

Kinists are different from adherents of other white nationalist religions, such as Christian Identity, Wotansvolk and Creativity: "What sets Kinists apart from many other white supremacist groups is their adherence to a biblical form of Christianity whose core belief is universal salvation through Jesus. Many other white supremacist groups completely reject Christianity or, when they do practice Christianity, they adhere to a form of the religion which only recognizes whites as capable of receiving salvation."

=== Influential works ===
Joel LeFevre, successor to Samuel T. Francis as editor of The Citizens Informer, the publication of the white nationalist Council of Conservative Citizens, endorsed kinism and said "[V]ery simply, without some level of discrimination, no nation ... can permanently exist at all."

Kinists often cite Robert Lewis Dabney and Rousas John Rushdoony. Rushdoony's son, Mark Rushdoony, argues this is a misinterpretation of his father's beliefs, who engaged in direct ministry with minorities and wed interracial couples—neither consistent with Kinist ideological beliefs.

== Criticisms ==
The Southern Poverty Law Center has called kinism "a new strain of racial separatism that wants America to be broken up into racial mini-states."

In 2019, a synod of the Christian Reformed Church in North America formally condemned kinism and declared it a heresy. This was in response to a kinist pastor who has since left the denomination.

== See also ==
- Alt-right
- Apartheid
- Christian Identity
- Ethnopluralism
- Polygenism
- National Policy Institute
- Nativism
- Neotribalism
- Northwest Territorial Imperative
- Phyletism
- Racial segregation
- White ethnostate
- White nationalism
- White supremacy
- Xenophobia
