= Assembly of Christian Soldiers =

Christian identity church and white supremacist group

The Assembly of Christian Soldiers is a Christian Identity church that was established in 1971 by former Ku Klux Klansmen. At its peak, the church had approximately 3,000 members organized into 16 congregations in Alabama, Georgia and Mississippi.

The Assembly of Christian Soldiers was incorporated in Alabama in August 1971 by Jessie L. Thrift, who was a former Grand Wizard of the Original Knights of the Ku Klux Klan, a schismatic KKK group. Among the members of the church were a number of other well-known KKK members. The church was best known for its 1970s program of using its tax-exempt donations to subsidize private, all-white segregated schools in the southeastern United States.
