= LaPorte Church of Christ =

Church located in Laporte, Colorado

Coordinates: 40°37′33″N 105°08′06″W

LaPorte Church of Christ is an independent church in Laporte, Colorado, led by Peter J. Peters (November 13, 1946 – July 7, 2011) from 1977 until his death.

== History ==
After completing study at the Church of Christ Bible Training School in Gering, Nebraska, Peters began preaching as a minister for the Church of Christ. In 1977, he went to the LaPorte Church of Christ. The church was unable to support him full time, so he also worked for the US Department of Agriculture, as he also held degrees in agri-business and economics. This was during the farm crisis of the 1980s and Peters witnessed many farmers who lost everything. During this time, Peters converted to Christian Identity as a result of listening to radio sermons by Identity minister Sheldon Emry. This caused Peters to lose all but five of the original congregants of LaPorte Church of Christ.

The church served mainly as a platform for Peters's views and its membership never went above 100. It attracted white supremacists, including the members of the terrorist organization The Order who murdered radio talk show host Alan Berg with whom Peters had clashed on Berg's radio program.

The church became involved in a controversy in Colorado, related to an amendment against homosexuality, which led to it being fined for a minor violation of election laws. Peters refused to pay the fine and the church was seized by the state in February 1993 as the debt exceeded $10,000.

LaPorte operates Scriptures for America, a shortwave radio service that broadcasts via WTWW in Lebanon, Tennessee. Peters's programming had previously been carried on WRNO and WWCR.

== Beliefs ==
Peters proclaimed that Europeans are the true Israel and that contemporary Jews may be of the synagogue of Satan (based on Revelation 2:9 and 3:9) and the descendants of the biblical Esau (Edom), the brother and nemesis of Jacob (Israel). Critics labeled his message to be that of Christian Identity, although he rejected this label. The church is no longer associated with the decentralized group of churches that use the name "Churches of Christ".
