= Canadian Anti-racism Education and Research Society =

Canadian non-profit organization

- Type: non-profit organization
- Industry: Civil and economic rights
- Founded: 1984, Vancouver, British Columbia, Canada
- Headquarters: Vancouver
- Key people: Alan Dutton, M.A., E.D.
- Website: stopracism.ca

The Canadian Anti-racism Education and Research Society (CAERS) is a Canadian non-profit organization that tracks hate groups and extremism, provides direct support to victims of racism and discrimination, and lobbies government and governmental agencies for the development of effective policy and legislation to stop racism. The social justice law firm Rush, Crane, Guenther, provides legal counsel.

== Government recognition ==
In 1998, CAERS received the BC Eliminates Racism Together Award from the Ministry of Multiculturalism for research that led to exposing the head of the Ku Klux Klan in British Columbia and organizing against hate.

In 2001, CAERS received an award from the Ministry of Multiculturalism and Immigration for organizing provincial consultations for the United Nations World Conference Against Racism. According to the Minister:

The Ministry of Multiculturalism and Immigration greatly acknowledges the important contribution to the United to Combat Racism: Equality-Dignity-Justice by the Canadian Anti-racism Education and Research Society. Your input, collaboration and leadership made this initiative [WCAR consultations] a success and effectively demonstrated the benefits when government and non-governmental organizations work together to build a society that is free from racism.

== Lobbying initiatives ==
Five foreign trained medical doctors began a hunger strike in 1990 to draw attention to discrimination in the allocation of medical internships in the province of British Columbia, Canada. In response to a request from the doctors, CAERS and other representatives met with Bill Vander Zalm, then Premier of the province, and John Jensen, then Minister of Health, to demand that the Ministry of Health and the College of Physicians and Surgeons provide equal access for immigrant doctors to internship programs. A report on the demands was written. Meetings were also arranged with the College of Physicians and Surgeons and political opposition parties. Failing to achieve equal access, a complaint was made to the British Columbia Human Rights Tribunal alleging discrimination in the allocation of internships by the BC Ministry of Health, the College of Physicians and Surgeons and Hospitals. In 1999, the tribunal ruled that foreign trained doctors were discriminated against by the College based on place of origin, but that Hospitals and the BC Ministry of Health had not discriminated.

In 1990, CAERS was invited to address the House of Commons legislative committee on proposed legislation to create the Canadian Race Relations Foundation (CRRF) as part of a reparations settlement for the internment of Japanese-Canadians during World War II. CAERS' submission was that the name of the CRRF was inappropriate and should not reflect popular misconceptions about the biological significance of the concept of "race" in socio-economic relations. CAERS also argued that careful measures were needed to ensure that the Foundation would be at arm's length from Government and that it should be a national voice on anti-racism to aid and support NGOs in the development of sustainable anti-racism initiatives.

In 1990, CAERS was requested to administer funding from the Canadian Labour Force Development Board to establish a national visible minority reference group for labour force development. The National Visible Minority (NVMC) arose from that funding.

The growth of hate groups and the widespread distribution of hate propaganda throughout North America, particularly in the early 1990s, led CAERS to lobby the Government of Canada to strengthen and broaden hate crime legislation, improve policing and lobby the various Attorneys General in each province to lay charges under the Criminal Code since the consent of the AG is a required before charges under the Criminal Code of Canada for the production and distribution of hate propaganda and advocating genocide can be laid. No charges had been made to then for the production or distribution of hate propaganda under the Criminal Code. To assess the degree of the problem and proposed solutions, CAERS convened an international conference on racism, hate crime and the law funded by the province of British Columbia. In response to a request from the Department of Justice, CAERS prepared a report on the production and distribution of hate material by white supremacist organizations.

Based on the recommendations of the Racism, Hate Crime and the Law conference and the report prepared for the Department of Justice, CAERS began lobbying the Attorney General of BC to establish a dedicated policing unit focusing on hate crime. The first hate crime unit in Canada was soon formed with representation from various police forces in the province and the Community Liaison Branch of the Ministry of the Attorney General and in 1998 the Attorney General of BC gave CAERS an award for exposing the head of the KKK and for providing public education on how to stop the spread of racism. However, no charges were laid against the Klan under the Criminal Code.

In 1997, CAERS warned that the Heritage Front and Odin's Law were establishing themselves in Surrey and in Vancouver's Eastend and that violence would ensue. On January 4, 1998 five racist skinheads kicked to death Mr. Nirmal Singh Gill outside the Guru Nanack temple. CAERS was requested to develop a manual on combatting hate groups with funding from the Ministry of the Attorney General.

Neo-Nazi and other extremist groups have historically used public facilities for meetings because of their low cost and because they lend credibility to their cause. (pic) In response to the use of publicly funded facilitates by hate groups, CAERS began lobbying all levels of government and holding demonstrations outside libraries. In response, the BC Library Association argued that libraries were independent of government control and that freedom of speech had no limits when libraries were concerned. The controversy about the responsible use of tax-payer supported institutions versus free speech generated a great deal of debate and a number of important motions by various city councils to develop acceptable use policy for publicly funded institutions. A complaint to the Ombudsman of BC resulted in the recommendation that libraries in BC issue a written statement of acceptable use regarding meeting room rental much like the acceptable use policy governing computer use and sexually explicit images and that persons using libraries comply with all federal, provincial and municipal legislation and regulations. The Library board chair called the Ombudsman's recommendations ludicrous.

In response to a request from the Ministry of Community, Aboriginal and Women's Services (MCAW) in 2004, Alan Dutton represented CAERS on a steering committee to establish a strategic direction on anti-racism and multiculturalism for British Columbia. The committee developed a "Blueprint for Change" document that was to guide ministry programs and activities for the next three to five years. Despite the representation by CAERS and other NGOs, the Government of BC ignored the major recommendations of the committee and began to isolate itself from grass roots organizations and NGOs in favour of five or six large immigrant settlement agencies in the province and to develop a Safe Harbour program without teeth, accountability or grass-roots community support. CAERS viewed the program as a fundamental shift from anti-racism to symbolic multiculturalism.

In 2007, the Department of Justice Canada conducted a national study to develop recommendations to better respond to hate on the Net, or cyber hate. A national conference was held in Toronto to examine the recommendations from the study. CAERS lobbied against one national hot line because of competing interests and definitions and for support of community hot lines and proactive measures to counter-act cyber hate and the recruitment of youth into extremist groups.

== Community initiatives ==
CAERS has been instrumental in building community coalitions to expose and oppose racism across Canada. In 1992, CAERS helped form a coalition to boycott Japanese Air Lines (JAL) for alleged discriminatory seating and stop-over policy in Japan. An employee of Canadian Airlines, the booking agent for JAL, revealed a written policy that ordered JAL attendants to seat Delhi-bound passengers at the back of the plane. It was also alleged that hotel reservations for stopovers in Japan were discriminatory since Delhi-bound passengers were allocated basement accommodation. JAL denied that the seating and reservation policy were discriminatory. JAL agreed that there would be no seating and stop-over reservations without the consent of passengers.

In 1992, CAERS held a media conference and a rally to stop Tom Metzger of the California-based White Aryan Resistance (WAR) from organizing in B.C. Over 3,000 attended the anti-racist rally at the Vancouver Art Gallery in downtown Vancouver. The local organizer for WAR was Tony McAleer, who had been found to have contravened section 13 of the CHRC that prohibits the dissemination of messages likely to expose groups to hatred by telephone and who was later jailed for contempt when he circumvented the CHRC decision by establishing a telephone message system in Washington State.

In the early 1990s, a local newspaper in the suburbs of Vancouver, the North Shore News, began to regularly publish articles suggesting that immigrants from Iran were taking over Canada, were responsible for crime and that the Holocaust did not occur. Authorities cited for these claims were Ernst Zündel and a number of European Holocaust deniers, including David Irving. CAERS organized demonstrations to denounce the publisher and newspaper. Two human rights complaints were subsequently filed under the BC Human Rights Code against the editor and the writer, Doug Collins. The first, by the Canadian Jewish Congress, failed but the second, by a private small businessman, succeeded and the newspaper was fined and forced to print an apology.

News of Charles Scott recruiting in the armed forces and schools in several smaller communities in BC broke in 1995. Scott was the Canadian leader of the racist Church of Christ in Israel. In response, CAERS worked with several groups, including Salmon Arm Coalition Against Racism and local Mayors to organize public events in each of the local communities Charles Scott had set up the group, including Abbotsford, Kelowna, Creston and Yahk.

Radio station CKST broadcast a series of interviews in 1995 with Holocaust denier David Irving, Doug Collins and leader of Aryan Nations in Canada, Charles Scott, CAERS gave interviews to several newspapers complaining that the radio station was providing a forum for racists. Radio station AM 1040 retaliated by suing CAERS and Alan Dutton for libel. Of the two newspapers that carried interviews with Dutton, only the Western Jewish Tribune was included in the libel suit. The issue was resolved when AM 1040 dropped the libel suit and paid legal costs.

In 1998, when Nirmal Sign Gill, a caretaker at the Guru Nanak Temple in Surrey, B.C., was kicked to death by five racist skinheads, CAERS participated in an anti-racist coalition to organize a mass community march and rally. The skinheads charged in the murder of care caretaker were caught by police surveillance planning to kill many more at the Temple. The call for a mass rally was opposed by several groups and by Surrey City Council that feared that the march and rally would end in violence. To fan the fears, the Vancouver Sun reported that the neo-Nazi Heritage Front was organizing a counter-demonstration. In July 1999 more than 3,000 men, women and children peacefully marched to Bear Creek Park to hear speeches and listen to music commemorating the death of Mr. Gill. The Surrey RCMP detachment supplied over 50 uniformed police officers for traffic control and security.

In response to requests from employees at a Surrey telephone call-in centre, CAERS organized a series of community meetings concerning employment and human rights. The BC Government Employees Union had mounted a campaign to organize the employees and several had complained of retaliation from the employer. CAERS represented several employees at mediation hearings before the BC Human Rights Tribunal and Employment Insurance and won major settlements.

== Educational Initiatives ==
CAERS received support from the National Film Board of Canada, the Department of Canadian Heritage, the government of British Columbia] and Knowledge Network to interview leaders and present and former members of racist groups to produce educational resources on the recruitment and recovery of youth from racist groups. Video-taped interviews were conducted with Ernst Zündel, Charles Scott, Christopher Brodsky, Dan Sims, Kerry Noble, and Johnny Lee Carey.

In 1999, five hate crime conferences for aboriginal communities in the province were funded in 1998 and CAERS was tasked with presenting research on hate groups affecting Aboriginal Communities in each of the regional conferences.

Following a number of incidents in Correctional facilities in 1998, CAERS was tasked by Corrections Canada to develop a manual on racist symbols, to develop educational materials for Corrections staff, to deliver workshop for staff and to hold meetings with inmates on issues related to racism within Corrections.

In 1999, the United Nations proposed a world conference on racism and discrimination to be held in Durban South Africa and several regional preparatory conferences were held throughout the world. CAERS was a delegate of the Government of Canada to the European prep-conference held in Strasbourg, France, and was funded to attend the main conference in Durban. In Canada, CAERS was commissioned to organize regional preparatory conferences for the WCAR by the BC Government. In 2001 the Ministry Of Multiculturalism And Immigration recognized CAERS with an award for community leadership for the work done for the WCAR. The Government of Canada also sponsored regional prep-conferences and CAERS was represented on the advisory committee and thematic sub-committees.

To address hate on the Net and its impact on youth, a conference, Anti-racism Online, was held with support from the BC Human Rights Commission and Simon Fraser University.

Following several incidents between students of Asian and European descent, the Pitt Meadow School District contracted with CAERS to provide workshops on anti-racism and to conduct meetings between faculty and student groups. Over the course of several months, tensions were reduced and new guidelines were developed for dealing with complaints.

In 2006, CAERS began continued to be active with other community-based groups in monitoring the development of groups like the Aryan Guard in Calgary and Lethbridge, Alberta and Regina, Saskatchewan.

== Legal Matters ==
CAERS, Alan Dutton, and the Jewish Western Bulletin were sued for libel when Dutton was quoted as saying that radio station AM 1040 was broadcasting interviews with racists. AM 1040 had broadcast extensive interviews with Paul Fromm, David Irving, Doug Collins of the North Shore News, Charles Scott of the Church of Jesus Christ in Israel, and Tony McAleer of the White Aryan Resistance Movement. The White Aryan Resistance Movement was a racist California based group. The leader was Tom Metzger who was found to have encouraged the murder of an African immigrant in Portland, Oregon. The Georgia Straight carried the same allegations as the Jewish Western Bulletin but was not sued. The case went to discovery but was dropped. AM 1040 paid legal costs.
