= Christian Apologetics and Research Ministry =

American Protestant organization

- Abbreviation: CARM
- Formation: 1995
- Type: 501(c)(3)
- Legal status: Active
- Location: United States
- Founder/President: Matthew Slick
- Board of directors: Matthew Slick, David Kimball, Charlie Spine
- Website: carm.org

The Christian Apologetics and Research Ministry (CARM) is a nonprofit, nondenominational Protestant apologetics ministry with an internet and radio outreach. It is involved in evangelism, including full-time support for several foreign missionaries. It is based in the United States and was founded in 1995. Matthew Slick currently serves as president of the ministry. The ministry is registered as a 501(c)(3) organization and is headquartered in Nampa, Idaho.

== Organization ==
In November 1995, Matthew Slick compiled his sermons and notes together onto computer, and created a website for the Christian Research Ministry. By 2000, Slick said that his website was receiving 14,000 visits per week. He created a Christian Apologetics Notebook presentation in a three-ring-binder format, which offered material from the website in a printed medium. Slick says he has sold over 3,000 copies of the Christian Apologetics Notebook. He also compiled the website material for sale in CD-ROM format.

CARM offers several online dictionaries, including a theological dictionary compiled by Matt Slick and others. The organization's stated motivation is "to equip Christians with good information on doctrine". In 2004, CARM made available a free resource called the Dictionary of Theology for the Palm OS system. The website also provides Protestants with pre-formatted "cut-and-paste" arguments to use in online forums with atheists, relativists, Muslims, Mormons, Jehovah's Witnesses, Catholics and members of other groups.

== Beliefs ==
CARM is a Protestant ministry, involving several different branches of Protestantism. For example, CARM's official position is that the Calvinist interpretation of Christianity is "within orthodoxy," but does not brand itself a Calvinist ministry, saying that both Calvinists and non-Calvinists write articles.

== Reception ==
Conservative columnist Cal Thomas of Tribune Media Services comments, "Christian Apologetics and Research Ministry (the Web site carm.org) has created a useful chart that shows the conflicting claims of classic Christian belief and Muslim doctrines. It is worth studying, whatever one's faith." Christian Parenting Today notes that the website of CARM provides "lists, definitions, and descriptions of cults", to assist parents and children with identifying controversial groups and movements. The Ontario Consultants on Religious Tolerance says of CARM, "This is a very large web site. It is rated by Hitbox.com as the most visited counter-cult website, and about #14 in the list of most-visited religious web sites." The Gazette recommended CARM as a resource for information on apologetics. Writing in the South Florida Sun-Sentinel, Pastor Bob Coy of Calvary Chapel, Fort Lauderdale characterized CARM among "excellent resources… that will allow those who are seriously searching to discover faith is more fact than fiction."

In the book The New Media Frontier: Blogging, Vlogging, and Podcasting for Christ, Roger Overton, a blogger and graduate student at Talbot School of Theology, recommends CARM as a resource, calling the organization's website "an informative site dealing with topics from the defense of mere Christianity to exposing the problems in cults and other religions. Go to the CARM website for the straight facts such as a list of the prophecies Jesus fulfilled or archived incriminating statements by the Church of Jesus Christ of Latter-day Saints (Mormons) and The Watchtower (Jehovah's Witnesses)." Thomas Nelson's Safe Sites Internet Yellow Pages, The 2000–2001 Edition describes the organization as "A Christian ministry promoting Christian truth with articles on doctrine, Mormons, Jehovah's Witnesses, Evolution, New Age, atheism, and more." The book recommends the organization's Theological Dictionary as among the "Best of the Christian Web", saying it "Defines many Christian and theological terms."

== Publications ==
- Slick, Matt (2008). Apologetics School – Student Edition. Christian Apologetics and Research Ministry.
- Slick, Matt (2008). Critical Thinking School. Christian Apologetics and Research Ministry.
- Slick, Matt (2009). Theology School – Student's Edition. CARM.
- Slick, Matt (2008). Theology School – Teacher's Edition. Christian Apologetics and Research Ministry.

== See also ==
- Christian countercult movement
- List of Christian apologetic works
