= Church of Jesus Christ–Christian =

American white supremacist church

The Church of Jesus Christ–Christian, formerly the White Identity Church of Jesus Christ–Christian, is an American Christian Identity, white supremacist church, which was founded in 1946 by Ku Klux Klan organizer Wesley A. Swift in Lancaster, California. Swift was the son of a Methodist Episcopal Church, South minister and is considered a significant figure in the early years of the Christian Identity movement in the United States. Swift's work and copyrights are carried on by Kingdom Identity Ministries.

== History ==
The church was originally known as the Anglo-Saxon Christian Congregation in Lancaster, California, assuming its present name in 1957. The hyphenated name would seem unobjectionable to an outsider, but was used to express the Identity belief that Jesus was not a Jew.

After Wesley Swift's death in 1970, the ministry was continued by his wife Lorraine Swift. Roy Gillaspie was in a leadership position between 1950 and the 1970s.

In February 2001, the names Church of Jesus Christ–Christian and Aryan Nations were transferred to Victoria and Jason Keenan when the Keenans won a US $6.3 million lawsuit against the organizations after being attacked by Aryan Nations paramilitary soldiers; the Aryan Nations compound was also transferred to the Keenans. In March 2001, the Keenans sold the compound to the Cambridge, Massachusetts-based Carr Foundation, a human rights organization which plans to build a human rights center on the property.

The church resurfaced in August 2009, five years after the death of Richard Butler, who resumed the ministry after the death of Swift. The church is now headed by a council of three men, including Senior Pastor Paul R. Mullet.
