= Pre-Adamite =

Belief that humans existed before the biblical character Adam

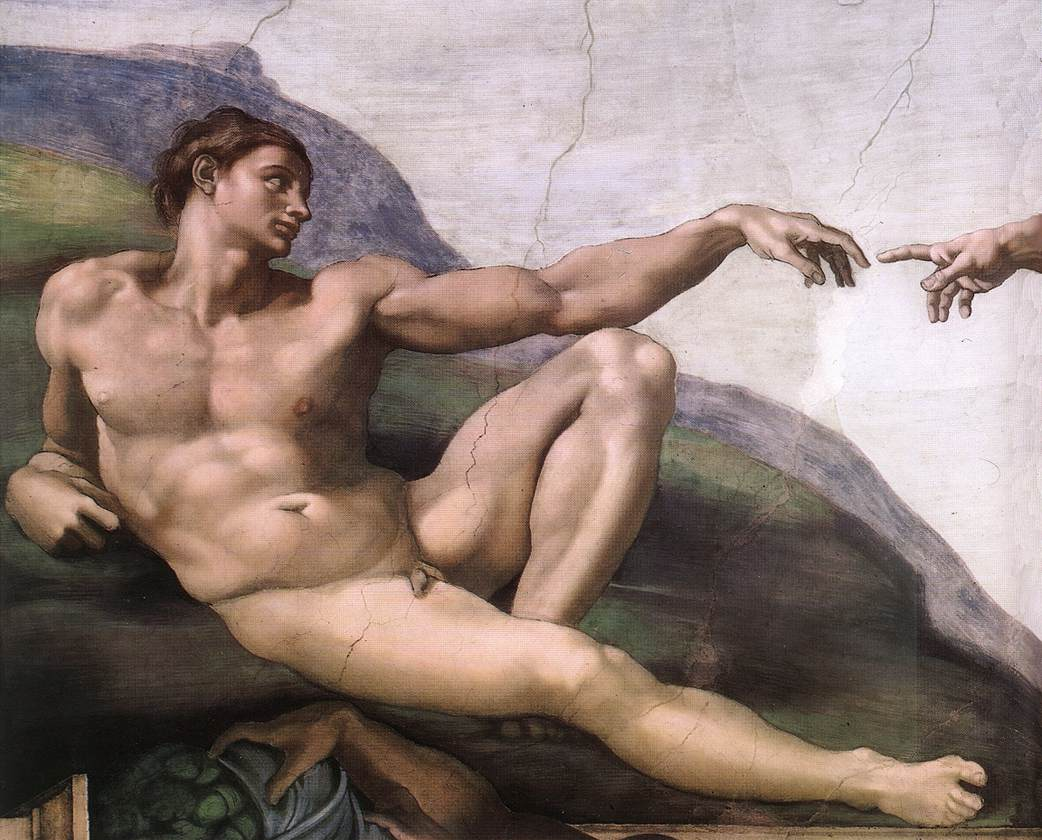
Creation of Adam in the Sistine Chapel

The pre-Adamite hypothesis or pre-Adamism is the theological belief that humans (or intelligent yet non-human creatures) existed before the biblical character Adam. Pre-Adamism is therefore distinct from the conventional Abrahamic belief that Adam was the first human. "Pre-Adamite" is used as a term, both for those humans (or human-like animals) believed to exist before Adam, and for believers or proponents of this hypothesis.

== Early development ==
The first known debate about human antiquity took place in 170 AD between a Christian, Theophilus of Antioch, and an Egyptian pagan, Apollonius the Egyptian (probably Apollonius Dyscolus), who argued that the world was 153,075 years old.

An early challenge to biblical Adamism came from the Roman Emperor Julian the Apostate, who, upon his rejection of Christianity and his return to paganism, accepted the idea that many pairs of original people had been created, a belief termed co-Adamism or multiple Adamism.

Augustine of Hippo's The City of God contains two chapters indicating a debate between Christians and pagans over human origins: Book XII, chapter 10 is titled Of the falseness of the history that the world hath continued many thousand years and the title of book XVIII, chapter 40 is The Egyptians' abominable lyings, to claim their wisdom the age of 100,000 years. These titles tend to indicate that Augustine saw pagan ideas concerning both the history of the world and the chronology of the human race as incompatible with the Genesis creation narrative. Augustine's explanation aligned with most rabbis, and with the church fathers, who generally dismissed views on the antiquity of the world as "myths and fables", whereas Jewish and Christian claims were based on "revealed truth".

Augustine did take a critical view of the young earth narrative in some aspects, arguing that everything in the universe had been created simultaneously by God, and not seven literal days. He was primarily concerned with arguing against the idea of humanity having existed eternally rather than a Bible-based chronology of human history.

== 900–1700 ==
In early Islam, a common belief held that humankind is actually the successor of other intelligent creatures such as jinn and hinn. Medieval Muslim traditions referred to the jinn as pre-Adamites, depicted as human-like in various ways. Although the notion of jinn as pre-Adamites was generally accepted, the idea that other humans lived before the known Adam was controversial. From the mid-ninth century onward the idea appeared that God created several Adams, each of whom presides over an era lasting around 50,000 years. This concept was regarded as heretical, but was widely accepted by Ismailis and some Sufis.

A book titled Nabatean Agriculture, written or translated by Ibn Wahshiyya in 904, collated texts about the activities and beliefs of Arabic groups such as the Nabataeans, in defense of Babylonian culture against Islam. The book discussed the ideas that people lived before Adam, that he had parents, and that he came from India. It proposed that Adam was the father of an agricultural civilization, rather than the father of the entire human race.

The Jewish poet Yehuda Halevi wrote his Kitab al Khazari between 1130 and 1140, which featured a discussion wherein the King of the Khazars questioned three theologians (a Jewish rabbi, a Christian, and a Muslim) which was the true religion, and raised the challenge that people in India said they had buildings and antiquities which were millions of years old. The rabbi responded that his faith was unshaken, as the Indians lacked "a fixed form of religion, or a book concerning which a multitude of people held the same opinion, and in which no historical discrepancy could be found." The rabbi dismissed Indians as dissolute, unreliable people, whose claims could be ignored. Later in the book, Halevi rejected the Nabatean claims as these people did not know of the revelation in Scripture, and he dismissed Greek theories of an eternal world. In his conclusion, Halevi maintained that Adam was the first human in this world but left open other possibilities: "If, after all, a believer in the Law finds himself compelled to admit an eternal matter and the existence of many worlds prior to this one, this would not impair his belief that this world was created at a certain epoch, and that Adam and Noah were the first human beings."

The claims in Nabatean Agriculture were also disputed by Maimonides (1135–1204) in The Guide for the Perplexed. He attributed the concepts to the Sabians and said they were just legends and mythology which deviated from monotheism though drawing on Jewish sources, but in refuting the speculations, he circulated an outline of the ideas among other scholars: "They deem Adam to have been an individual born of male and female like any other human individuals, but they glorify him and say that he was a prophet, the envoy of the moon, who called people to worship the moon. and there are compilations of his on how to cultivate the soil." He noted the claim that Adam came from India, and went on to Babylon.

The presence of a belief in the existence of men before Adam among the Familists, a religious community in Friesland, was noted by John Rogers in 1578.

In 1591, Giordano Bruno argued that, because no one could imagine that the Jews and the Ethiopians had the same ancestry, God must have either created separate Adams or that Africans were the descendants of pre-Adamic races.

The 17th-century French millenarian Isaac La Peyrère is usually credited with formulating the pre-Adamite theory because of his influence on subsequent thinkers and movements. In his Prae-Adamitae, published in Latin in 1655, La Peyrère argued that Paul's words in Romans 5:12–14 should be interpreted to mean that "if Adam sinned in a morally meaningful sense there must have been an Adamic law according to which he sinned. If law began with Adam, there must have been a lawless world before Adam, containing people." Thus, according to La Peyrère, there must have been two creations; first the creation of the Gentiles and then the creation of Adam, who was the father of the Hebrews. The existence of pre-Adamites, La Peyrère argued, explained Cain's taking of a wife and the building of a city after Abel's murder in the Book of Genesis.

In Politica Hermetica, Laszlo Toth wrote that "racial theory has as its official birthdate 24 April 1684," when François Bernier distinguished four or five races in an article titled A new division of the Earth, according to the different species or races of men who inhabit it published in the Journal des sçavans. Because of widespread theological opposition to the pre-Adamite theories of his friend La Peyrère, Bernier published his paper anonymously.

== Age of Enlightenment ==
During the Age of Enlightenment, pre-Adamism was adopted widely as a challenge to the biblical account of human origins. In the 19th century, the idea was welcomed by advocates of white superiority. A number of racist interpretive frameworks involving the early chapters of Genesis arose from pre-Adamism. Some pre-Adamite theorists held the view that Cain left his family for an inferior tribe described variously as "nonwhite Mongols" or that Cain took a wife from one of the inferior pre-Adamic peoples.

== 1800–present ==
=== In racism ===
In 19th-century Europe, pre-Adamism was attractive to those who were intent on demonstrating the inferiority of non-Western peoples, and in the United States, it appealed to those who were attuned to racial theories but found it unattractive to contemplate a common history with non-whites.

Scientists such as Charles Caldwell, Samuel G. Morton and Josiah C. Nott rejected the view that non-whites were the descendants of Adam. Morton combined pre-Adamism with cranial measurements. As Michael Barkun explains:

In such an intellectual atmosphere, pre-Adamism appeared in two different but not wholly incompatible forms. Religious writers continued to be attracted to the theory both because it appeared to solve certain exegetical problems (where did Cain's wife come from?) and exalted the spiritual status of Adam's descendants. Those of a scientific bent found it equally attractive but for different reasons, connected with a desire to formulate theories of racial difference that retained a place for Adam while accepting evidence that many cultures were far older than the few thousand years that humanity had existed, according to the biblical chronology. The two varieties differed primarily in the evidence they used, the one relying principally on scriptural texts and the latter on what passed at the time for physical anthropology.

In 1860, Isabella Duncan wrote Pre-Adamite Man, Or, The Story of Our Old Planet and Its Inhabitants, Told by Scripture & Science, a mixture of geology and scriptural interpretation. The book was popular among a number of geologists because it mixed biblical events with science. She suggested that the pre-Adamites are today's angels. Since they were without sin, for sin did not enter the world until Adam disobeyed God, there was no reason for them not to have been at least raptured into heaven, anticipating what would again occur with the second coming of Jesus Christ. Duncan also believed that some angels had sinned and fallen from Heaven, which caused them to become demons. Duncan believed that such an upheaval would leave geological scars on the earth. The concept of ice ages, pioneered by Louis Agassiz, seemed to provide evidence of such events, drawing the line between the pre-Adamic era and the modern one, which she posited began about 6,000 years ago.

In 1867, Buckner H. Payne, writing under the pen name Ariel, published a pamphlet titled The Negro: What is His Ethnological Status? He insisted that all of the sons of Noah had been white. According to his hypothesis, if the Flood had been universal, the only survivors of it should have been white, so why were non-white people living on Earth? To answer this question, Payne suggested that the "Negro" is a pre-Adamic human of the field (specifically, a higher order which was preserved on Noah's Ark). According to Payne, the Pre-Adamites were a separate species without immortal souls.

The Irish lawyer Dominick McCausland, a Biblical literalist and anti-Darwinian polemicist, maintained the theory in order to uphold the Mosaic timescale. He believed that the Chinese were descended from Cain and he also believed that the "Caucasian race" would eventually exterminate all other races. He also believed that only the "Caucasian" descendants of Adam were capable of creating civilization, and he tried to explain away the existence of the numerous non-"Caucasian" civilizations by attributing all of them to a vanished "Caucasian race", the Hamites.

In 1875, A. Lester Hoyle wrote a book, The Pre-Adamite, or who tempted Eve? In his book, he claimed that there had been five distinct creations of races, but only the fifth race, the white race, of which Adam was the father, had been made in God's own image and likeness. Hoyle further suggested that Cain was the "mongrel offspring" of Eve's being seduced by "an enticing Mongolian" with whom she had repeated trysts, thus laying the foundation for the white supremacist bio-theology that miscegenation was "an abomination".

In an unusual blend of contemporary evolutionary thinking and pre-Adamism, the Vanderbilt University theistic evolutionist and geologist Alexander Winchell argued in his 1878 tract, Adamites and Preadamites, for the pre-Adamic origins of the human race, on the basis that the Negroes were too racially inferior to have been descended from the Biblical Adam. Winchell also believed that the laws of evolution operated according to the will of God.

In 1891, William Campbell, under the pen name "Caucasian", wrote in Anthropology for the People: A Refutation of the Theory of the Adamic Origin of All Races that the non-white peoples were not the descendants of Adam and were therefore "not brothers in any proper sense of the term, but inferior creations" and he also wrote that polygenism was the "only theory reconcilable with scripture." Like Payne before him, Campbell viewed the Great Flood as a consequence of intermarriage between the white (Adamic) and the nonwhite (pre-Adamic) peoples "the only union we can think of that is reasonable and sufficient to account for the corruption of the world and the consequent judgement."

In 1900, Charles Carroll wrote the first of his two books on pre-Adamism, The Negro a Beast; or, In the Image of God, in which he sought to revive the ideas which had previously been presented by Buckner H. Payne, describing the Negro as a literal ape rather than a human. In a second book which was published in 1902, The Tempter of Eve, he put forth the idea that the serpent was actually a black female, and he also theorized that miscegenation was the greatest of all sins. Carroll claimed that the pre-Adamite races, such as blacks, did not have souls. He believed that race mixing was an insult to God because it spoiled His racial plan of creation, and he also believed that the mixing of races had led to the errors of atheism and evolution.

The Scottish millennialist George Dickison wrote The Mosaic Account of Creation, As Unfolded in Genesis, Verified by Science in 1902. The book mixed science with a scientifically enhanced reading of Genesis and it also listed geological discoveries which showed that men existed before Adam had been created and proved that Earth was much older than the 6000-year-old span of the Adamic race. Dickison welcomed scientific discoveries from fossil evidence and the palaontological record and used them as evidence of pre-Adamism.

The idea that "lower races" are mentioned in the Bible (in contrast to Aryans) was posited in the 1905 book Theozoology: or The Science of the Sodomite Apelings and the Divine Electron by Jörg Lanz von Liebenfels, an Ariosophist and a volkisch writer who influenced Nazism.

The doctrine which is known as British Israelism, which developed in England in the 19th century, also included a pre-Adamic worldview but Pre-Adamism was a minority position. The model viewed pre-Adamites as a race of inferior bestial creatures which was not descended from Adam, because according to it, Adam was the first white man and consequently, he was the first son of God. In the narrative, Satan seduces Eve, and the resulting offspring is a hybrid creature, Cain. Later, Cain flees to East Turkestan to establish a colony of followers who are intent on realizing the Devil's plan for domination of the earth. A further elaboration of this myth involved the identification of the Jews with the Canaanites, the putative descendants of Cain, but the eponymous ancestor of the Canaanites is not Cain, but Canaan. It followed that if the tribes of Judah were supposed to have intermarried with Cain's descendants, the Jews were both the offspring of Satan and the descendants of sundry nonwhite pre-Adamic races.

In the United States, philo-Semitic British Israelism developed into the antisemitic Christian Identity movement and the serpent seed doctrine. Identity preacher Conrad Gaard wrote that the serpent was a "beast of the field" who was the father of Cain, and since Cain married a pre-Adamite, his descendants were a "mongrel, hybrid race".

=== Other pre-Adamists ===
The occultist Paschal Beverly Randolph published Pre-Adamite Man: Demonstrating The Existence of the Human Race Upon the Earth 100,000 Thousand Years Ago! under the name Griffin Lee in 1863. The book took a primarily scientific view of pre-Adamism, relying on evidence from linguistics, anthropology, archaeology, paleontology, and ancient history. Being a polygenist, Randolph argued that the color of races, particularly black, was not the result of climate and was proof of separate, pre-Adamite origins.

Pre-Adamite theories have also been held by a number of mainstream Christians such as the Congregational evangelist R. A. Torrey (1856–1928), who believed in the Gap Theory. Torrey believed it was possible to accept both evolution and biblical infallibility, with the pre-Adamite as the bridge between religion and science.

Gleason Archer Jr. was a believer in pre-Adamism. In his 1985 book A Survey of Old Testament Introduction he wrote,

To revert to the problem of the Pithecanthropus, the Swanscombe man, the Neanderthal and all the rest (possibly even the Cro-magnon man, who is apparently to be classed as Homo sapiens, but whose remains seem to date back at least to 20,000 B.C.) it seems best to regard these races as all prior to Adam's time, and not involved in the Adamic covenant. We must leave the question open, in view of the cultural remains, whether these pre-Adamic creatures had souls (or, to use the trichotomic terminology, spirits).

Archer asserted that only Adam and his descendants were infused with the breath of God and a spiritual nature corresponding to God himself, and that all mankind subsequent to Adam's time must have been literally descended from him. Regarding the concept of pre-Adamic races (such as the Cro-Magnon man), he says: "They may have been exterminated by God for unknown reasons prior to the creation of the original parent of the present human race."

More recently, such ideas have been promoted by Kathryn Kuhlman and Derek Prince among Pentecostals, John Stott among Anglicans, Old Earth creationist Hugh Ross, and computational biologist S. Joshua Swamidass.

== See also ==
- Creationism
- Curse and mark of Cain
- Curse of Ham
- Garden of Eden
- Multiregional origin of modern humans
- Nephilim – Biblical figures feared for their strength before the Flood
- Sons of Noah
