= Wesley A. Swift =

American minister (1913–1970)

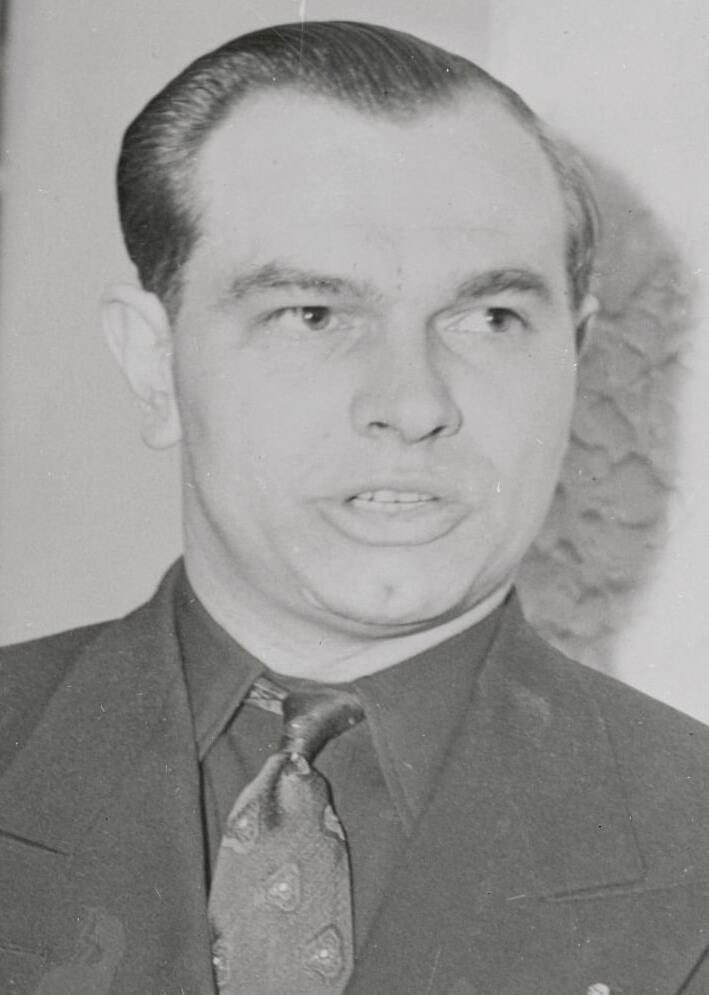
- Swift in April 1946
- Born: September 6, 1913; New Jersey, U.S.
- Died: October 8, 1970 (aged 57); Mexico
- Occupation: Minister

Wesley Albert Swift (September 6, 1913 – October 8, 1970) was an American minister from Southern California who was known for his white supremacist views and was a central figure in the Christian Identity movement from the 1940s until his death in 1970.

== Early life and influences ==
Wesley Albert Swift was born in New Jersey on September 6, 1913, the son of R.C. Swift, a Methodist minister who pastored a church on Long Island, New York.

Raised as a Methodist, Swift converted to Pentecostalism in the early 1930s. Swift was a student at L.I.F.E. Bible College (now Life Pacific University) at the Angelus Temple, Aimee Semple McPherson's Pentecostal Foursquare Church, during the 1930s. Swift later served as a minister at the Angelus Temple during the 1930s and 1940s.

Swift's wife, Genevieve, told interviewers that he was introduced to British Israelism by Gerald Burton Winrod, an evangelist from Kansas, who was a speaker at Angelus Temple. Swift was a student of Rev. Philip Monson's Kingdom Bible School during the 1930s; Monson taught British Israelism and some of the racial teachings which Swift would later reformulate into Christian Identity theology. Swift was also exposed to Charles Parham's British Israel teachings at the Angelus Temple. During the 1930s and 1940s, Swift became a leader of the local British Israel community, serving as president of the Anglo-Saxon Christian society, leader of the Great Pyramid Club, and leader of the Anglo-Saxon Bible Study Group at Angelus Temple. In the mid-1940s, Swift emerged as a well known advocate of Christian Identity.

In a December 1932 Los Angeles Times news story, it was reported that Swift foiled an attempt to kidnap his wife. Swift fired shots at the kidnappers and the family escaped into the Angelus Temple to evade their pursuers.

== Christian Identity and white supremacy ==
=== British Israel leader ===
In the 1940s, Swift founded his own church, Anglo-Saxon Christian Congregation, which he renamed the Church of Jesus Christ–Christian in 1957. The church's website states that "Wesley Swift is considered the single most significant figure in the early years of the Christian Identity movement in the United States." Most sources give 1948 as the year in which Swift incorporated his church, but one source reported 1946. Michael Barkun described Swift as the "central figure" in Christian Identity between the 1940s and his 1970 death.

=== Ku Klux Klan ===
In 1946, while living in Lancaster, California, Swift was taken in for questioning by police in connection with a cross burning near San Bernardino. Swift denied being involved in the Klan at the time.

Swift was involved in the revival of a branch of the Ku Klux Klan in California during the mid-1940s, helping to establish the short lived California Klan. Roy Elonzo Davis and William Upshaw were in California at the time and they assisted in fundraising efforts for the Klan. Swift was responsible for the formation of the Antelope Valley chapter of the Ku Klux Klan.

Swift worked closely with Gerald L.K. Smith, an American Nazi sympathizer and politician during the 1940s. Swift was billed as a speaker at the Little Rock Nine protests, but did not speak and instead served as one of the hooded klansmen escorting and protecting Gerald Smith during one of his speeches.

=== Christian Identity pioneer ===
"Swift pioneered a particularly insidious form" of racism which became "the most distinctive element" of Christian Identity theology: the belief that non-whites and Jews are the "biological offspring" of Satan (the serpent). Swift combined the two-seed-line teaching of British Israelism with Russel Kelso Carter's theory about the sexual nature of Eve's sin in the Garden of Eden. He concluded that "the violation of Divine law by Lucifer" was caused by the "interbreeding" of "the peoples of earth". He insisted that all of the non-white races were the products of interbreeding between the peoples of the Earth and Cain's descendants.

Swift believed "that the only descendants of Adam are the white men", and he also believed that "the rest of the beings represent the agents of evil because of their direct link with the fallen angels". The teaching also associated the offspring of Satan (the serpent) "with the activities of the Catholic Church and the Pope". The ideology taught the belief that the descendants of the serpent could be genetically identified, claiming that "the nature of the seed of the serpent are as fixed as the skin of a modern Ethiopian or the spots of a leopard", and it also taught the belief that "what is genetically marked cannot and will not change". Swift espoused "an extreme version of the Calvinist doctrine of double predestination, in which those who are predestined to salvation and those who are predestined to perdition can only be recognized by their racial status."

Interracial marriage was an important topic to Swift. He believed that different races could coexist as long as racial segregation was maintained. He stated "there isn't anything wrong with being black, but there is something wrong when you try to mix that black species with the white man, that is a violation of God's law, that is wrong". Swift believed that salvation was possible for members of all races, but that their status as lower orders of beings would always be maintained. He stated, "Do not worry about these other races. You teach them to worship the right God and you set them free… He says He will go to the end of the earth and that eventually, all of these people, all of them, shall be saved and justified according to His purpose and His plan." Swift insisted that "God's plan for the world is segregation and a preservation of Kind," and he believed that whites were the master race that would rule all other races. Swift relied heavily on the Book of Enoch to justify his theology. The Christian Identity ideas held by Swift were viewed as extreme by some others on the far right. Swift's views were denounced by Robert W. Welch Jr., the founder of the John Birch Society, but supported and financed by Birch supporter James Oviatt, for whom the James Oviatt Building is named.

Swift continued to promote some classical British Israelite beliefs. He believed that the United States was the true Land of Israel and he also believed that the Anglo-Saxon race constituted the true descendants of the ancient Israelites, stating "This great nation of ours is one of the great nations of Israel." Swift deviated from traditional British Israelite thought by associating God's "divine covenant" with a race, rather than a nation. He also deviated from traditional British Israelism by associating the Tribe of Judah with Germans, and claiming the Jewish people were imposters; British Israelism believed the Jewish people to be Tribe of Judah.

Swift believed in and promoted the idea of a militarized end-of-the-world apocalypse, which would culminate in a war between the races which he believed were descended from the serpent, and the pure race which he believed was descended from Adam. As a result of his beliefs, he was very active in organizing armed militias in preparation for the supposed end-of-days conflict.

=== Influence and legacy ===
Swift attracted a group of like-minded ministers who assisted him by spreading Christian Identity views. Key figures who assisted Swift included Connie Lynch, a fellow KKK recruiter, Oren Petito, a neo-Nazi, and Neuman Britton. Petito, whose mailing address was in Jeffersonville, Indiana, was a leader of the National States' Rights Party. William Potter Gale was a disciple of Swift who grew in importance in the group.

In a 1965 report, the Attorney General of California named Swift as the leader of the California Rangers and the Christian Defense League, paramilitary organizations for white supremacists. Swift spread his teachings through recorded tapes of his sermons and tracts.

Swift did not create a systematic theology. Beyond his racial views, he did not offer any other significant religious views. Swift claimed that his teachings were the true successor of British Israelite thought. He traced himself in a line of succession back to the earliest teachers of the ideology through his teacher, Phillip Monson, to Howard Rand, to C.A.L. Totten, to Edward Hine. Gerald Smith publicized Swift's ministry through his publications in which he advertised Swift's tracts and recordings on Christian Identity topics beginning in the 1940s. Smith also assisted Swift by organizing speaking tours and conventions for British Israelite and white supremacist communities during the 1940s and 1950s.

William Branham, who was influenced by Swift's teachings, re-branded elements of Christian Identity as the "Serpent Seed" and from 1958, he spread it among his followers. Several figures associated with Swift were also key members of Branham's campaigning team. Arnold Murray, a Missouri based televangelist was ordained in the Church of Jesus Christ. Swift's ideology has influenced generations of white supremacists.

By 1966, Swift had established a chain of churches throughout the United States, and as a result, some of his churches were located in California, Arkansas, Louisiana, Missouri, Florida, and Washington. In the United States in the 1990s, 245 ministers and groups were reportedly promoting the Christian Identity teachings which he espoused in 41 states. David Duke and Tom Metzger were heavily influenced by Swift's teachings and were major promoters of his teachings in the 1970s and 1980s. After Swift's death, the headquarters of Swift's church was moved to Idaho and renamed Aryan Nations by his successor, Richard Girnt Butler. Butler built on Swift's teachings to build what he called a "white bastion" in Hayden Lake, Idaho.

Swift collapsed and died of a heart attack in a Mexican clinic on October 8, 1970, while he was waiting to receive treatment for kidney disease and diabetes.

== Sources ==
- Barkun, Michael (1997). Religion and the Racist Right: The Origins of the Christian Identity Movement. UNC Press Books. p. 68. ISBN 9781469611112.
- Schambers, Jon F. (2000). Mystical Anti-Semitism and the Christian Identity Movement (PDF). Stockton, CA: University of the Pacific.
