= Christian Identity =

White supremacist interpretation of Christianity

Christian Identity (also known as Identity Christianity) is an interpretation of Christianity which advocates the belief that only Celtic and Germanic peoples, such as the Anglo-Saxon, Nordic nations, or the Aryan race and kindred peoples, are the descendants of the ancient Israelites and are therefore God's "chosen people". It is a racial interpretation of Christianity and is not an organized religion, nor is it affiliated with specific Christian denominations. It emerged from British Israelism in the 1920s and developed during the 1940s–1970s. Today it is practiced by independent individuals, independent congregations, and some prison gangs.

No single document expresses the Christian Identity belief system, and some beliefs may vary by group. However, all Identity adherents believe that Adam and his offspring were exclusively White. They also believe in Two House theology, which makes a distinction between the Tribe of Judah and the Ten Lost Tribes, and that ultimately, European people represent the Ten Lost Tribes. This racialist view advocates racial segregation and opposes interracial marriage. Other commonly held beliefs are that usury and banking systems are controlled by Jews, leading to opposition to the Federal Reserve System and use of fiat currency, believing it to be part of "the beast" system. Christian Identity's eschatology is millennialist.

Christian Identity is characterized as racist, antisemitic, and white supremacist by the Anti-Defamation League and the Southern Poverty Law Center.

Estimates of the number of adherents in the United States in 2014 ranged from two thousand to fifty thousand.

== Origins ==
=== Relationship to British Israelism ===
The Christian Identity movement emerged in the United States in the 1920s and 1930s as an offshoot of British Israelism. Early British Israelites such as Edward Hine and John Wilson were philosemites. The typical form of the British Israelite belief held that modern-day Jews were descended from the tribes of Judah and Benjamin, while the British and other related Northern European peoples were descended from the other ten tribes. Christian Identity emerged in sharp contrast to British Israelism as a strongly antisemitic theology, and by the 1940s to 1970s, it was teaching that contemporary Jews were either descendants of Eurasian Khazars or literal descendants of Satan.

=== Early influences ===
Christian Identity's relationship to British Israelism is derived from a key text, Lectures on Our Israelitish Origin by John Wilson (1840). Wilson was the first to formalize a distinction between the northern kingdom of Israel and the southern kingdom of Judah. Although Wilson's views were not antisemitic, they were embraced by modern Christian Identity adherents who believe that the northern tribes were carried off by the Assyrians and remained racially pure as they migrated into modern Europe, while the southern kingdom eventually formed an alliance with Satan.

In the 1920s, the writings of Howard Rand (1889–1991) began to have an influence. Considered a transitional figure from British Israelism to Christian Identity rather than its actual founder, Rand is known for coining the term "Christian Identity". Rand's father raised him as a British Israelite, introducing him to J. H. Allen's work Judah's Sceptre and Joseph's Birthright (1902) by offering him five dollars ($80.36 in 2025) if he would read it and write a report on it. Around 1924, Rand began to claim that the Jews are descended from Esau or the Canaanites rather than the tribe of Judah, although not going so far as to advocate the "serpent seed" doctrine.

During the late 1920s, Anglo-Israelite writers began to compile research from 19th century writers Dominick McCausland, Alexander Winchell, and Ethel Bristowe, using them to develop five basic beliefs that would become the core tenets of Christian Identity doctrine. These were that Adamites represented Aryans as the chosen, that nonwhites were tainted through race-mixing, that the serpent in the story of the Fall was not a reptile, but the Devil himself, that the seedline of Cain came through a union of Satan (the serpent) and Eve, and that the Jews were descended from this unholy line and thus had a natural propensity for evil.

In 1933, Rand founded the Anglo-Saxon Federation of America, an organization which began to promote the view that the Jews are not descended from Judah. Beginning in May 1937, there were key meetings of British Israelites in the United States who were attracted to this theory, and these meetings provided the catalyst for the eventual emergence of Christian Identity. By the late 1930s, the group's members considered Jews to be the offspring of Satan and demonized them, and they also demonized non-Caucasian races. Rand, however, rejected the satanic origin theories. This doctrine came to confirm the explicit separation between British-Israelism and Christian Identity.

Links between Christian Identity and the Ku Klux Klan were also forged in the late 1930s, but by then, the KKK was past the peak of its early twentieth-century revival.

=== Emergence as a separate movement ===
Christian Identity began to emerge as a separate movement in the 1940s, primarily over issues of racism and antisemitism rather than over issues of Christian theology. Wesley Swift (1913–1970) is considered the father of the movement; so much so that every Anti-Defamation League publication which addresses Christian Identity mentions him. Swift was a minister in the Angelus Temple Foursquare Church during the 1930s and 1940s before he founded his own church in Lancaster, California and named it the Anglo-Saxon Christian Congregation, reflecting the influence of Howard Rand. In the 1950s, he was Gerald L. K. Smith's West Coast representative of the Christian Nationalist Crusade. In addition, he hosted a daily radio broadcast in California during the 1950s and 1960s, through which he was able to proclaim his ideology to a large audience. Due to Swift's efforts, the message of his church spread, leading to the founding of similar churches throughout the country.

Eventually, the name of his church was changed to the Church of Jesus Christ–Christian. Today this name is used by Aryan Nations. One of Swift's associates was retired Col. William Potter Gale (1917–1988). Gale became a leading figure in the anti-tax and paramilitary movements of the 1970s and 1980s, beginning with the California Rangers and the Posse Comitatus, and he also helped found the American militia movement.

The future Aryan Nations founder Richard Girnt Butler, who was an admirer of Adolf Hitler and Wisconsin Senator Joseph McCarthy, was introduced to Wesley Swift by William Potter Gale in 1962. Swift quickly converted Butler to Christian Identity. When Swift died in 1971, Butler fought against Gale, James K. Warner, and Swift's widow for control of the church. Butler eventually gained control of the organization and moved it from California to Hayden Lake, Idaho in 1973.

Lesser figures participated as Christian Identity theology took shape in the 1940s and 1950s, such as San Jacinto Capt, a Baptist minister and California Klansman, who claimed that he had introduced Wesley Swift to Christian Identity; and Bertrand Comparet (1901–1983), a one-time San Diego Deputy City Attorney and associate of Gerald L. K. Smith. Later Identity figures of the 1970s and 1980s include Sheldon Emry, Thomas Robb, and Peter J. Peters.

The Christian Identity movement first received widespread attention from the mainstream media in 1984, when The Order, a neo-Nazi terrorist group, embarked on a murderous crime spree before it was suppressed by the FBI. The movement returned to public attention in 1992 and 1993, in the wake of the deadly Ruby Ridge confrontation, when newspapers discovered that right-wing separatist Randy Weaver had a loose association with Christian Identity believers.

These groups are estimated to have two thousand members in the United States and an unknown number of members in Canada and the rest of the British Commonwealth. Due to the promotion of Christian Identity doctrines through radio and later through the Internet, an additional fifty thousand unaffiliated individuals are thought to hold Christian Identity beliefs.

While most of the Identity groups of the 1960s and 1970s relied on mailing lists, publications, and cassette recordings to disseminate their teachings, later figures promoted their ministries using radio and television. Pete Peters and his Scriptures for America program was considered to be one of the largest white supremacist radio ministries in the United States. Additionally, Peters was an early pioneer in promoting Identity via the Internet. Today, Christian Identity is promoted through the Internet by using blogs, podcasts, and other means. The most prominent Identity teacher today is William Finck.

== Beliefs ==
A 1981 Christian Identity map created by E. Raymond Capt and W. Edmund Filmer, which distinguishes Jews from Israelites

Christian Identity theology promotes a racialist interpretation of Christianity. In his book, Gods of the Blood, Swedish historian and scholar of comparative religion Mattias Gardell has noted that "Christian Identity is best understood as an umbrella concept under which a variety of different theologies are found". He points out that there are considerable differences in dogma and religious practice between various ministries and groups. Some Christian Identity churches preach with more violent rhetoric than others, but all of them believe that Celtic and Germanic peoples, such as the Anglo-Saxon, Nordic nations, or the Aryan race and kindred peoples are the true Israelites and that modern Jews have dispossessed them of their identity as God's chosen race. Identity beliefs are conspiratorial, believing that all of history represents a great cosmic war between the forces of good and evil. It is all part of a Satanic plot to take control of creation.

Christian Identity beliefs were primarily developed and promoted by two authors who considered Europeans to be the chosen people and considered Jews to be the cursed offspring of Cain, the serpent seed, a belief which is known as the dual-seedline or two-seedline doctrine. Wesley Swift formulated the doctrine which states that non-Caucasian peoples have no souls and therefore they can never earn God's favor or be saved.

No single document expresses the Christian Identity belief system; there is much disagreement over the doctrines which are taught by those who ascribe to Identity beliefs, since there is no central organization or headquarters for the Identity sect. Michael Barkun identified Christian Identity as being built around 3 distinct beliefs: that whites are the true descendants of the biblical tribes of Israel, that Jews are the spawn of Satan, and that there will be an imminent, apocalyptic struggle between good and evil, with the whites against the Jews. Identity adherents cite passages from the Old Testament, including Ezra 9:2, Ezra 9:12, and Nehemiah 13:27, which they claim contain Yahweh's injunctions against interracial marriages.

Christian Identity adherents assert that the white people of Europe in particular or Caucasians in general are God's servant people, according to the promises that were given to Abraham, Isaac, and Jacob. It further asserts that the early European tribes were really the Ten Lost Tribes of Israel and therefore the rightful heirs to God's promises, and God's chosen people. Colin Kidd wrote that in the United States, Christian Identity exploited "the puzzle of the Ten Lost Tribes to justify an openly anti-Semitic and virulently racist agenda." According to Michael McFarland and Glenn Gottfried, Indentitarians developed their racist interpretation of Christianity because of its status as a traditional religion of the United States, which allowed them to advocate the belief that white Americans have a common identity, and because of the variety of possible interpretations of the Bible in the field of hermeneutics.

While they seek to introduce a state of racial purity in the US, Christian Identitarians do not trust the Congress or the government, allegedly controlled by Jews, to support their agenda. In their view, this means that political changes can only be made through the use of force. However, the failed experience of the terrorist group The Order has forced them to acknowledge the fact that they are currently unable to overthrow the government by staging an armed insurrection against it. Thus, the Christian Identity movement seeks an alternative to violence and government change with the creation of a "White Aryan Bastion" or a White ethnostate, such as the Northwest Territorial Imperative.

Being decentralized with no center of orthodoxy, individual pastors each have their own approach to biblical hermeneutics. However, the teacher-student relationship is how training and ordination occur, and is very important to an Identity congregation.

=== Adamites and pre-Adamites ===
Much of the racism in Christian Identity is the result of the pre-Adamite hypothesis, which is a cornerstone of Identity theology. Christian Identity adherents believe that Adam and Eve were only the ancestors of white people. In this view, Adam and Eve were preceded by lesser, non-Caucasian races which are often (although not always) identified as "beasts of the field" (Genesis 1:25, Genesis 2:19–20) who took human form as a result of mating with Adamites.

To support their theory on the racial identity of Adam, Christian Identity proponents point out that the Hebrew etymology of the word "Adam" (Aw-Dam) translates as "to show blood in the face, flush or turn rosey. Be dyed, made red (ruddy)", often quoting from James Strong's Exhaustive Concordance, and concluding that proves Adam as the ancestor of the Caucasian race.

An influence on the Christian Identity movement's views on pre-Adamism was Charles Carroll's 1900 book The Negro a Beast or In the Image of God? In his book, Carroll sought to revive the ideas which were previously presented by Buckner H. Payne, he described the Negro as a literal ape rather than a human being. He claimed the pre-Adamite races such as blacks did not have souls and that race mixing was an insult to God because it spoiled his racial plan of creation. According to Carroll, the mixing of races had also led to the errors of atheism and evolutionism.

=== Serpent seed ===
Dual Seedline Christian Identity proponents –those who believe that Eve bore children with Satan as well as with Adam – believe that Eve was seduced by the Serpent (Satan), shared her fallen state with Adam by having sex with him, and gave birth to twins with different fathers: Satan's son Cain and Adam's son Abel. This belief is referred to as the serpent seed doctrine. According to the "dual seedline" form of Christian Identity, Cain then became the progenitor of the Jews in his subsequent matings with members of the non-Adamic races.

Seedline theology in Identity circles can take different forms. The most racist form of this belief that modern Jews are literal descendants of Satan. Other groups consider themselves to be authentic Jews and do not proclaim a hatred of Jews, although they are suspicious of them.

=== Scientific racism ===
Scientific racism, sometimes termed biological racism or racialism, the pseudoscientific belief that empirical evidence exists to support or justify racism, is the core tenet of Christian Identity, and most CI adherents are white nationalists who advocate racial segregation and the imposition of anti-miscegenation laws.

Identity adherents also assert that disease, addiction, cancer, and sexually transmitted infections (herpes and HIV/AIDS) are spread by human "rodents" via contact with "unclean" persons, such as "race-mixers". The apocrypha, particularly the first book of Enoch, is used to justify these social theories; the fallen angels of Heaven sexually desired Earth maidens and took them as wives, resulting in the birth of abominations, which God ordered Michael the Archangel to destroy, thus beginning a cosmic war between Light and Darkness. The mixing of separate things (e.g., people of different races) is seen as defiling all of them, and it is also considered a violation of God's law.

=== Two House theology ===
Like British Israelites, Christian Identity adherents believe in Two House theology, which makes a distinction between the Tribe of Judah and the Ten Lost Tribes. "Israel" was the name given to Jacob after he wrestled with the angel at Penuel as described in Genesis 32:26–32. Israel then had twelve sons which began the Twelve Tribes of Israel. Around 931 BC the unified kingdom was split into the Kingdom of Israel in the north and the Kingdom of Judah in the south. After northern Kingdom of Israel was conquered by Assyria at c. 721 BC, the ten tribes disappeared from the Biblical record.

According to British-Israel doctrine, 2 Esdras 13:39–46 then records the history of the nation of Israel journeying over the Caucasus Mountains, along the Black Sea, to the Ar Sereth tributary of the Danube in Romania ("But they formed this plan for themselves, that they would leave the multitude of the nations and go to a more distant region, where no human beings had ever lived. ... Through that region there was a long way to go, a journey of a year and a half; and that country is called Arzareth"). The tribes prospered, and eventually colonised other European countries. Israel's leading tribe, the Tribe of Dan, is attributed with settling and naming many areas which are today distinguished by place names derived from its name – written ancient Hebrew contains no vowels, and hence "Dan" would be written as DN, but would be pronounced with an intermediate vowel dependent on the local dialect, meaning that Dan, Den, Din, Don, and Dun all have the same meaning. Various modern place names are said to derive from the name of this tribe:

- Macedonia – Macedonia – derived from Moeshe-don-ia (Moeshe being "the land of Moses")
- Danube – Dan-ube, Dniester – Dn-iester, Dnieper – Dn-ieper, Donetz – Don-etz, Danzig – Dan-zig, Don – Don

The following peoples and their analogous tribes are believed to be as follows:

- Dan – Denmark
- Gad – Italy
- Asher – Sweden
- Issachar – Finland
- Simeon – Spain
- Zebulun – France
- Naphtali – Norway
- Benjamin – Iceland
- Reuben – Netherlands
- Judah – Germany
- Ephraim – Great Britain
- Manasseh – United States

While British Israelites believe that modern Jews are descended from the tribe of Judah, Christian Identitarians believe that the true lineal descendants of Judah are not contemporary Jews, but are instead the modern-day Anglo-Saxon, Celtic, Germanic, Nordic, and kindred peoples.

Some followers claim that the Identity genealogy of the Davidic line can be traced to the royal rulers of Britain and Queen Elizabeth II. Thus, Anglo-Saxons are the true Israelites, God's chosen people who were given the divine right to rule the world until the Second Coming of Christ.

Identity adherents reject the label "antisemitic" by stating that they cannot be antisemitic because the true Semites "today are the great White Christian nations of the western world", with modern Jews being considered the descendants of the Canaanites.

=== Views on homosexuality ===
Identity preachers proclaim that, according to the Bible, "the penalties for race-mixing, homo-sexuality, and usury are death."

=== Views on racial politics and economics ===
The first documents which advocated Christian Identity's views on racial politics and economics were written by Howard Rand and William J. Cameron after the Great Depression. In 1943, Rand published the article "Digest of the Divine Law" which discussed the political and economic challenges which existed at that time. An excerpt from the article states: "We shall not be able to continue in accord with the old order. Certain groups are already planning an economy of regimentation for our nation; but it will only intensify the suffering and want of the past and bring to our peoples all the evils that will result from such planning by a group of men who are failing to take into consideration the fundamental principles underlying the law of the Lord."

While Rand never formally named the groups which he was specifically referring to, his hatred of Jews, racial integration, and the country's economic state at that time made the direction of his comments obvious. Identifying specific economic problems was not the only goal which Rand had in mind. He began to analyze how these changes could be made to happen through legal changes; thus, making strategic plans to integrate the Bible into American law and economics. The first goal was to denounce all man-made laws and replace them with laws from the Bible. The second goal was to create an economic state which would reflect the teachings of the Bible.

While William Cameron agreed with Rand's initial argument, he specifically focused his writings on changing American economics. One of Cameron's articles, "Divine System of Taxation", spoke of the Bible supporting individualism and social justice with regard to economics. He also believed that the government had no right to tax land or other forms of property. In accordance with this doctrine, tax refunds should be applied to family vacation trips or they should be applied to national festivals which are observed by adherents of Christian Identity. Also, for the betterment of the United States' economic future, no interest should be charged on debts which are paid with credit, and no taxes should be collected during the traveling time of goods from a manufacturer to a consumer.

The mutual point which Rand and Cameron both agreed upon, was that while they may have disagreed with how the government was operating, neither of them resisted the government's current tax policies. Gordon Kahl was the first CI believer to study the founding principles of Rand and Cameron, and apply them in order to take action against the government. Kahl believed that they were on the right track with regard to what needed to be accomplished in order to change public policies. However, he felt that if no actions were taken against violators, no real changes would be made. In 1967, he stopped paying taxes because he felt he was paying "tithes to the Synagogue of Satan". Kahl killed two federal marshals in 1983. Before he was caught for the murders, Kahl wrote a note in which he said "our nation has fallen into the hands of alien people. ... These enemies of Christ have taken their Jewish Communist Manifesto and incorporated it into the Statutory Laws of our country and thrown our Constitution and our Christian Common Law into the garbage can."

=== Opposition to the banking system ===
Identity doctrine asserts that the "root of all evil" is paper money (particularly Federal Reserve Notes), and that both usury and banking systems are controlled by Jews. Exodus 22:25, Leviticus 25:35–37 and Deuteronomy explicitly condemn usury. Ezekiel 18:13 states "He who hath given forth upon usury, and hath taken increase: shall he then live? He shall not live: he hath done all these abominations; he shall surely die; his blood shall be upon him" and it is quoted as a justification for killing Jews.

Christian Identity advocates the belief that the creation of the Federal Reserve System in 1913 shifted the control of money from Congress to private institutions and violated the Constitution and the monetary system encourages the Federal Reserve to take out loans, creating trillions of dollars in government debt, and allowing international bankers to control the United States. Credit/debit cards and computerised bills are seen as the fulfillment of the Biblical scripture which warns against "the beast" (i.e., banking) as quoted in Revelation 13:15–18.

Identity preacher Sheldon Emry stated that "Most of the owners of the largest banks in America are of Eastern European (Jewish) ancestry and connected with the (Jewish) Rothschild European banks", thus, according to Identity doctrine, the global banking conspiracy is led and controlled by Jewish interests. Emry used the radio airwaves to promote his Christian Identity message and his book Billions for the Bankers, Debts for the People. Emry promoted abolishing the banks, which he suggested would solve most of society's ills, including unemployment, divorce, and women working outside the home.

=== Millenarianism and eschatology ===
Christian Identity is described as millenarian.

Sociology professor James Aho describes Christian Identity eschatology as dispensational premillennialist, which includes a physical return of Christ to earth at the final battle of Armageddon. However, in contrast with dispensationalism and some other millennialist forms of fundamentalist Christianity, Christian Identity adherents reject the notion of a rapture. Identity preacher Sheldon Emry taught that the idea of a rapture is a Jesuit doctrine and John Nelson Darby, who initially formalized this eschatological concept, was an agent of the Jesuits. In addition to rejecting rapture beliefs, Michael Barkun notes that Identity also breaks significantly from the dispensational eschatology of fundamentalism which is centered around Israel, which Christian Identity rejects. For Identitarians who view Jews as the offspring of Satan, this leads them to view proponents of dispensational eschatology as agents of Satan.

Identity predictions vary, and some include a race war or a Jewish-backed United Nations takeover of the US, and that they should wage a physical struggle against individuals and groups which serve the forces of evil. While the Soviet Union has disappeared as a vital threat in their rhetoric, many Christian Identity adherents believe that Communists are secretly involved in international organizations like the United Nations, or the so-called "New World Order", in order to destroy the United States.

Along with teaching that America is the true Israel, some Identity preachers teach that America is the Zion of Bible prophecy and will be the seat of Christ's earthly, millennial kingdom.

== Organizations ==
Rather than being an organized religion, Christian Identity is diverse and decentralized. It is an ideology which is adhered to by a variety of groups. Some of these groups are churches and congregations, such as the Church of Jesus Christ–Christian, Church of Israel, LaPorte Church of Christ, Elohim City, Kingdom Identity Ministries, and The Shepherd's Chapel. Others are activist groups and paramilitary organizations such as Aryan Nations, Aryan Republican Army, Assembly of Christian Soldiers, Christian Defense League, The Covenant, the Sword, and the Arm of the Lord, and White Patriot Party. Other organizations that are not strictly Identity based, but have members who believe in Identity or have affiliations with believers in Identity are the Aryan Freedom Network and the Posse Comitatus. Members of the prison gang Aryan Brotherhood adhere to Identity, but it prioritizes criminal enterprise over ideology.

== Hard versus soft Identity ==
While most public and scholarly attention to Christian Identity focuses on the concern for possible criminal violence, Swedish historian Mattias Gardell points out in Gods of the Blood that there are two strains of Christian Identity, which he categorizes as hardcore and soft Identity. Similarly, David Brannan, writing in Terrorism and Political Violence, has called these two variations repentant and rebellious Identity. Certain events during the 1980s and 1990s brought a more violent strain of Identity into public attention, contributing to the crystallization of these two schools of thought. Gardell sees a likelihood of polarization continuing, thus resulting in two separate Aryan Israel religions. Jeffrey Kaplan argues that Christian Identity represents revolution within the religious tradition of Christianity, but, using Dan Gayman's Church of Israel as an example, suggests that the typical pattern follows that of earlier millenarian movements in which the dominant motif is societal withdrawal rather than revolutionary violence. The outbursts of violence, per Kaplan, are not the norm and are relatively short.

=== Hard or rebellious Identity ===
Although most Identitarians have lived within the dominant culture, some Christian Identity groups on the fringe of the movement have been associated with revolutionary violence. According to the Center on Terrorism, Extremism and Counterterrorism, "Christian Identity has developed a deep accelerationist current as a result of an active desire among CI adherents to expedite the Battle of Armageddon." James Mason, the inspirational leader of the accelerationist "siege culture", was at one time a Christian Identity minister. Leaders in this strain of Identity have included Richard Girnt Butler, James Wickstrom, 11th Hour Remnant Messenger, and Kingdom Identity Ministries.

The Terrorgram and Atomwaffen Division-aligned group Angelwaffen Crew adheres to accelerationist Christian Identity, as do some in the Boogaloo movement.

Tax resister and militia movement organizer Gordon Kahl had connections to the Christian Identity movement. His death in a 1983 shootout with federal authorities made him the first martyr of the Posse Comitatus. The Order, whose main objective was to start a white supremacist revolution against the United States, was almost entirely made up of individuals who were associated with various Christian Identity groups. Bob Mathews, the founder of The Order, is also considered a martyr in the movement.

Robert Millar's Elohim City, a white separatist community in Oklahoma which is associated with Christian Identity, is also associated with several violent acts. Chevie Kehoe spent time there following the Mueller family murders. Timothy McVeigh called the compound prior to the Oklahoma City bombing and he is linked to community resident Andreas Strassmeir. Richard Wayne Snell is buried there. Midwest Bank bandit Kevin McCarthy was a resident.

The Ozarks-based compound of The Covenant, The Sword, and the Arm of the Lord was the site of an FBI raid, which ultimately ended without shots fired as the result of CSA member Kerry Noble negotiating a surrender by CSA leader James Ellison.

Within Christian Identity circles, the Phineas Priesthood is made up of individuals who have committed a "Phineas action"; a term used to reference a higher law as opposed to rejection of law itself. This term is broadly used in reference to murders of interracial couples, murders of same-sex couples, antisemitic acts, and violent acts against members of other non-white ethnic groups. Byron De La Beckwith, the assassin of NAACP and Civil rights movement leader Medgar Evers, was also linked to the Phineas Priesthood. Immediately prior to entering prison, De La Beckwith was ordained as a minister in the Temple Memorial Baptist Church, a Christian Identity congregation in Knoxville, Tennessee by Reverend Dewey "Buddy" Tucker.

=== Soft or repentant Identity ===
Soft Identity sees the concept of serpent seed theology as allegory. It dismisses National Socialism as secular diversion and ungodly occultism. It further rejects the vigilante concept of the Phineas Priesthood adopted by hardcore Identity, seeing it as misguided. The claim is that while they should be prepared for the final battle, the start button for the battle should be left to God, thus rejecting an accelerationist belief.

Although they are not considered pacifists, leaders within "soft" Identity reject the violence of the more militant side, complaining that it has resulted in all of Identity being "painted with the same brush, thereby transforming Identity into an icon of evil in the public mind". Leaders within this strain have sought to distance themselves from more militant strains by rejecting the "Identity" label and adopting terms like "Kingdom Israel" or "Covenant People". The soft Identity school includes Pete Peters, Ted Weiland, Jack Mohr, and Dan Gayman.

Brannan points out that most academic writing on Gayman focuses on the ideology of the greater Identity movement, glossing over his theology, as an agenda-driven polemic; further stating that although Gayman's theology is problematic, overstating the position and lumping all Identity together is dangerous. Gayman takes a traditional view of Romans 13 and rejects the militia movement as illegitimate, drawing a firm distinction between repentant Identity and the rebellious forms. Brannan concludes that repentant Identity has a more coherent presentation of theology, despite its academic or scholastic flaws. Thus, it is more theologically driven than the ideologically driven rebellious Identity.

== See also ==
- Anglo-Saxonism
- Aryanism
- Black Hebrew Israelites
- Branhamism
- Christian fascism
- Christian Party
- Christian nationalism
- Christian Patriot movement
- Christian supremacy
- Fascism in North America
- Groups claiming affiliation with Israelites
- Kinism
- List of organizations designated by the SPLC as hate groups § Christian Identity
- Nordicism
- Positive Christianity
- Radical right (United States)
- Sovereign citizen movement
