= Everett Sileven Ramsey =

American fundamentalist pastor (born 1939)

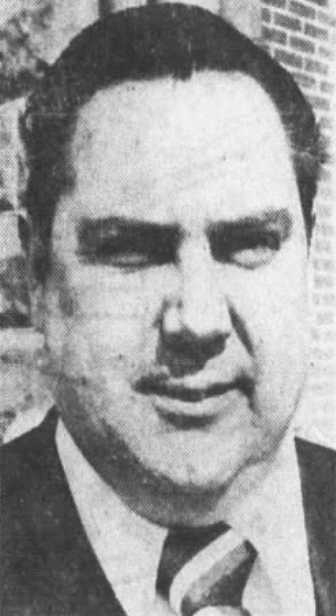
- Sileven circa 1978
- Born: April 24, 1939 (age 87); Muskogee, Oklahoma
- Education: Southwest Missouri State Teacher's College; Hillsboro College; Washington University; Southern Illinois University; Faith Baptist Theological Seminary
- Occupations: Pastor; author
- Religion: Christianity
- Congregations served: Faith Baptist Church, Louisville, Nebraska

Everett Sileven Ramsey or Everett Ramsey, or Everett Sileven (Note: In 2012, Ramsey was listed as a John Birch Society speaker under the name Everett Silevan.) (born April 21, 1939) is a fundamentalist minister and Christian Identity proponent. As pastor of Faith Baptist Church in Louisville, Nebraska, Sileven operated a private Christian school through the church, refusing to register the school with the state. This set off a series of court battles that resulted in Sileven's arrest for contempt of court multiple times and a multi-day standoff at the church with supporters. Sileven later would campaign for the GOP nomination for governor of Nebraska in 1986, losing to Kay Orr who would go on to win the general election. He was later charged in a tax fraud scheme. Under the name Everett Ramsey, he preached a message of Christian Identity and hosted conferences featuring other prominent Identity figures.

== Background ==
Everett Sileven was born near Muskogee, Oklahoma on April 21, 1939. His mother died of cancer when he was four, after which his father, who was a Baptist preacher, moved the family to California. Later, Everett and his brother were adopted by an aunt and uncle in Missouri, Mr. and Mrs. Marvin Sileven. The Sileven's worked a ranch and young Everett learned to work timber, cattle, and a farm. He graduated from Houston High School in Houston, Missouri in 1957. He later attended Southwest Missouri State Teacher's College, Hillsboro College in Hillsboro, Missouri, Washington University, and Southern Illinois University. After college, he worked for ConAgra in Omaha, Nebraska and Frito Lay in Dallas, Texas. He began fulltime pastoral ministry after completing his Masters and Doctorate of Theology from Faith Baptist Theological Seminary in Morgantown, Kentucky.

== Unlicensed school ==
Everett Sileven moved to Louisville, Nebraska in 1973 to become pastor of Faith Baptist Church. In 1977, under the leadership of Sileven, the Faith Baptist started a Christian school using the A.C.E. curriculum. To run the school, they hired Edward and Martha Gilbert, who had both graduated from Baptist Bible College. Sileven's daughter, Tresa, who graduated from Hyles–Anderson College, was hired as head teacher. Sileven and others traveled to Lewisville, Texas to receive training at A.C.E. headquarters. The school opened on September 7, 1977.

However, Sileven and the church did not receive approval from the state. At the center of the issue was the fact that Sileven viewed the school as a ministry of the church, exempt from regulation by the state, while the State of Nebraska insisted that children must attend state approved schools being taught by state certified teachers.

Because the school operated without approval from the state, the state ordered the school was ordered closed in 1979. This set off a series of court battles, ultimately leading to the Supreme Court refusing the hear the case. In September, 1982, Silevan was arrested, and On October 18, 1982, Judge Raymond J. Case of Cass county district court ordered the school closed. The church building, which housed the school, was ordered padlocked except for worship hours by the judge. Around 85 fundamentalist ministers from around the country came to protest by refusing to leave the church, and had to be physically removed by law enforcement. Cleveland pastor Roy Thompson along with Greg Dixon, the Moral Majority national secretary and pastor of Indianapolis Baptist Temple, negotiated with authorities, seeking an end to the situation. Judge Cass eventually suspended his order to avoid continued confrontation between the out-of-state supporters and the local sheriff's office. The event was a public relations problem for the state of Nebraska with the Christian right. Pat Robertson covered the case on The 700 Club, while Christian publications published photographs of Sileven and supporting pastors from around the country being physically removed from the church by the local sheriff's department.

After serving four months in the Cass county jail for operating the school despite the state orders, Sileven was released on January 31, 1983. Meeting with reporters in front of the jail, Sileven proclaimed, "I do ask in the authoritative name of Jesus, the supreme law of the universe that God Almighty bind the officials of the state of Nebraska and Cass County from further interference with the ministry of God at Faith Baptist Church . . . by either converting them or restraining them or removing them or killing them".

Sileven again reopened the school, and in November, 1983, a warrant was issued for his arrest. He left the state, giving speeches around the country but returned via helicopter to lock himself in the church for another standoff with the sheriff. He was arrested and in April, 1984, charged with contempt of court for refusing to close the school. The Cass County District Court charged Sileven with criminal contempt for operating Faith Christian School in violation of the court order to close it. After serving 37 days of the eight-month sentence, Sileven was released on $10,000 bond, pending appeal. On January 4, 1984, the Nebraska Supreme Court unanimously overturned the sentence, determining that the lower court had erred by handing down criminal contempt sanctions when Sileven had been initially charged with civil contempt.

In 1983, H. Edward Rowe, then president of the Church League of America, wrote a book about the conflict titled The Day They Padlocked the Church. The book included an introduction by D. James Kennedy.

The case was finally settled in 1984 when an exemption for religious schools was provided by the Nebraska legislature, exempting registration and licensing as long as the school provided alternative evidence of meeting standards. Even as late as 2008, the case served as a point of discussion when the legislature again took up school regulation.

Sileven considers himself a Christian reconstructionist and his conflict against the state led many followers to seek training materials in reconstructionism, such as those produced by Gary North. His stand against the government made him a folk hero in the patriot movement as he continued to preach and speak about the evils of the American monetary system and the income tax while promoting the unregistered church movement.

== Campaign for governor ==
Sileven's stand against the state and his willingness to go to jail for it had won the support of the leader of the Moral Majority, Jerry Falwell. This made Sileven a minor celebrity in right-wing circles. Thus, on August 22, 1986, Sileven announced he would seek the Republican nomination for governor of Nebraska.

Announcing his candidacy, Sileven stated that "[he] decided to run because [he] felt there needed to be a conservative moral alternative to the current liberal trend" in the state, and that his platform was simply, "less taxes, less government". He also stated that he opposed the consolidation fo rural school districts and favored parental rights in education.

At the time of his candidacy, Sileven had five tax liens against him for non-payment of federal income tax.

Sileven reached out to conservative senator Jesse Helms to campaign for him, but Helms declined.

Sileven came in fourth with 4281 votes, losing to Kay Orr. Helen Boosalis received the Democratic nomination. Sileven commented that the nomination of two women to head the party tickets was "a sign of God's curse", and that the "selection of a woman leader indicates that a society has become degenerate". After losing the primary, Sileven stayed on the national circuit, speaking to patriot groups.

== Other legal troubles ==
=== Free electricity claims ===
In 1988, Sileven was under investigation by the attorney general of Nebraska for promoting heat pumps as a means of free electricity.

=== Tax fraud charges ===
Sileven was later charged with defrauding the Internal Revenue Service. In Houston, Missouri, Sileven was operating as president of American Financial Services (AFS). An associate, Michael Merling, was operating as the AFS accountant in Montreal. In a scheme that would conceal taxable income as non-taxable loan proceeds or charitable contributions, Sileven would forward client money to Merling, who would deposit it into an AFS account. A check for the deposit amount, less fees charged by AFS, would be sent to Sileven, who would deliver the check to the client in exchange for cash. They would then prepare fraudulent loan documents for a loan by First Canadian International Bank Ltd. to the client for an amount equal to the cash. Sileven would provide receipts to the clients to show the amount as a charitable contribution to Faith Baptist Ministries.

The IRS began its investigation based on a tip from the Nevada State Patrol and employed a private citizen, Greg Retzlaff, to conduct the preliminary investigation. The IRS then assigned the case to Marvin Koel, an IRS undercover agent. Koel posed as a client, Edward Felland, and met with Sileven numerous times in the United States and Canada during the investigation. The IRS was unable to lure Merling into the United States and since Canada does not extradite tax offenders, the IRS terminated its investigation into Merling.

On October 19, 1989, a federal grand jury in Omaha returned an indictment of Sileven. He was charged with one count of conspiracy to defraud the United States and three counts of mail fraud. He was arrested without incident in Rendon, Texas on November 9, 1989.

Sileven's trial began July 16, 1991. He represented himself in district court, although stand-by counsel was appointed to assist him, and following a five-day trial, the jury convicted Sileven of all four counts. He was sentenced to fifteen months on each count, to be served concurrently, and three years of supervised release on each count, to be served concurrently. Sileven appealed his conviction, arguing a number of items, including that his due process had been violated by the withholding of information from the grand jury and that statements entered into evidence by Merling were inadmissible as hearsay. Ultimately, the appellate court upheld the conviction and the sentencing.

== Christian Identity ==
As Everett Ramsey, he preaches a message of Christian Identity. He was converted to Identity while serving his jail sentence. Ramsey uses the term Christian Israelism and avoids the term Identity, seeing it as a negative label created by the government and the media.

In 1997, Ramsey hosted the Fourth Annual Super Conference of Christian Israel Churches in Branson, Missouri. In addition to Ramsey, speakers included Pete Peters, E. Raymond Capt, Gordon Mohr, and other Christian Identity figures.

Ramsey also preached against race mixing in his book Racial Difference: More Than Skin Deep.

== Publications ==
- Sileven, Everett (1983). America's First Padlocked Church. Fundamentalist Publications.
- — (1983). Dr. Sileven's Jail Writings. Fundamentalist Publications.
- — (1983). Dear Legislator: A Plea for Liberty in Christian Education. Fundamentalist Publications.
- — (1983). From Sovereignty to Slavery. Fundamentalist Publications.
- — (1986). The Christian and the Income Tax. Fundamentalist Publications.
- Ramsey, Everett (1994). Kingdom Commentary on Romans. America Today Publishers.
- — (1999). Racial Difference, More Than Skin Deep. Kingdom Identity Ministries.
- — (2015). Kingdom Parables. CreateSpace.

== Links ==
- Official website
