= Texas Gulf Coast =

Texas coastal boundary with Gulf of Mexico

Texas Gulf Coast Beaches of Texas
- Region
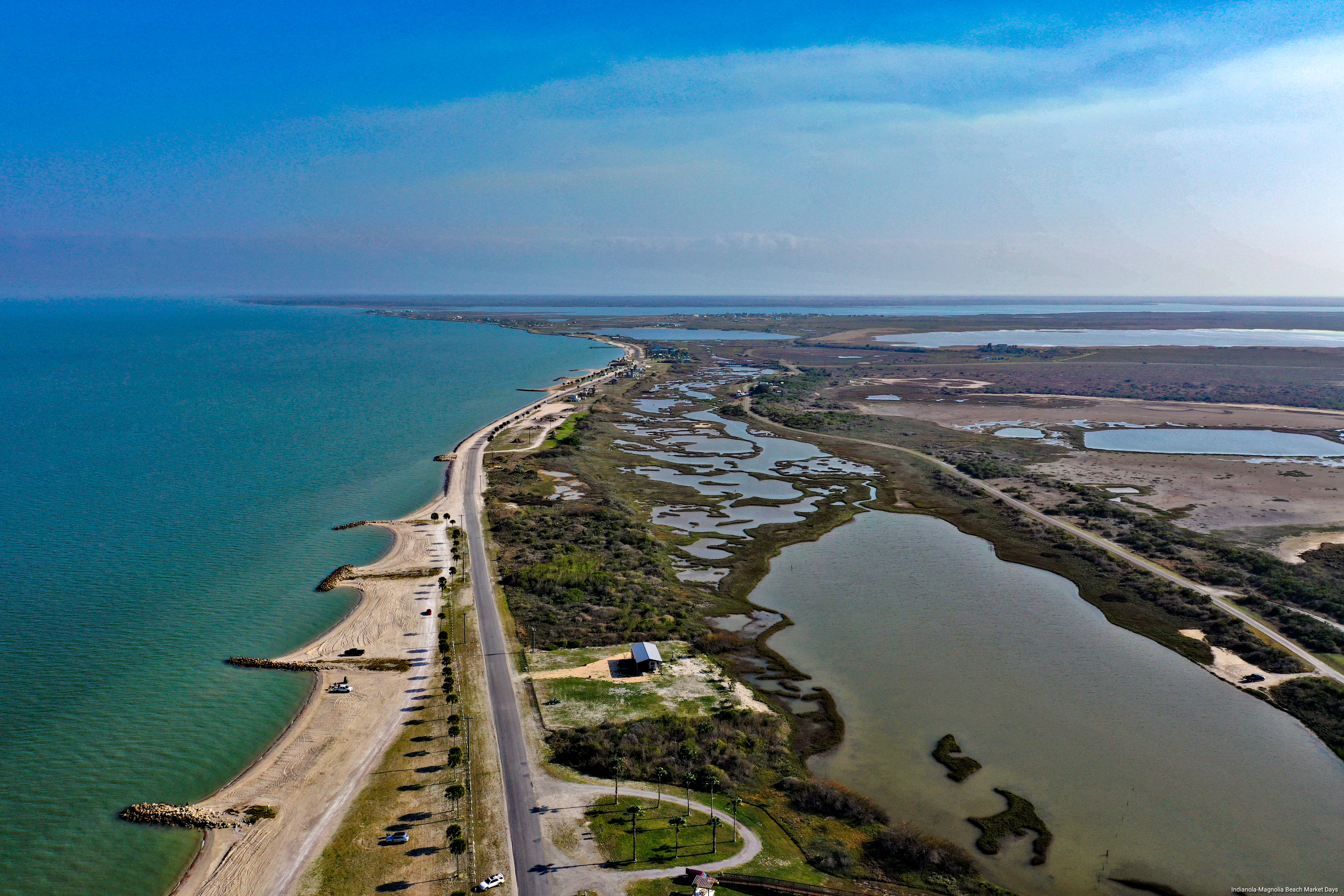
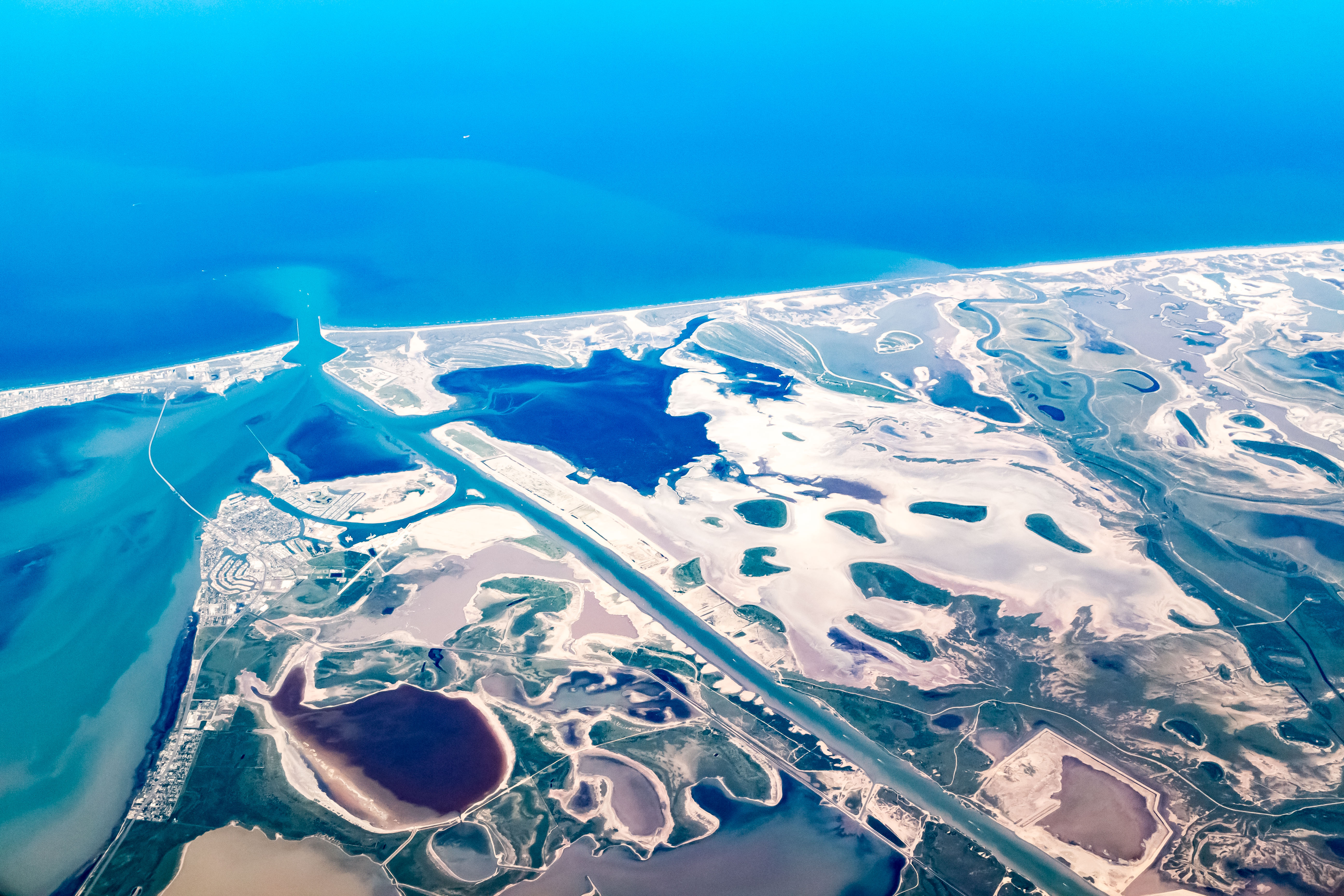
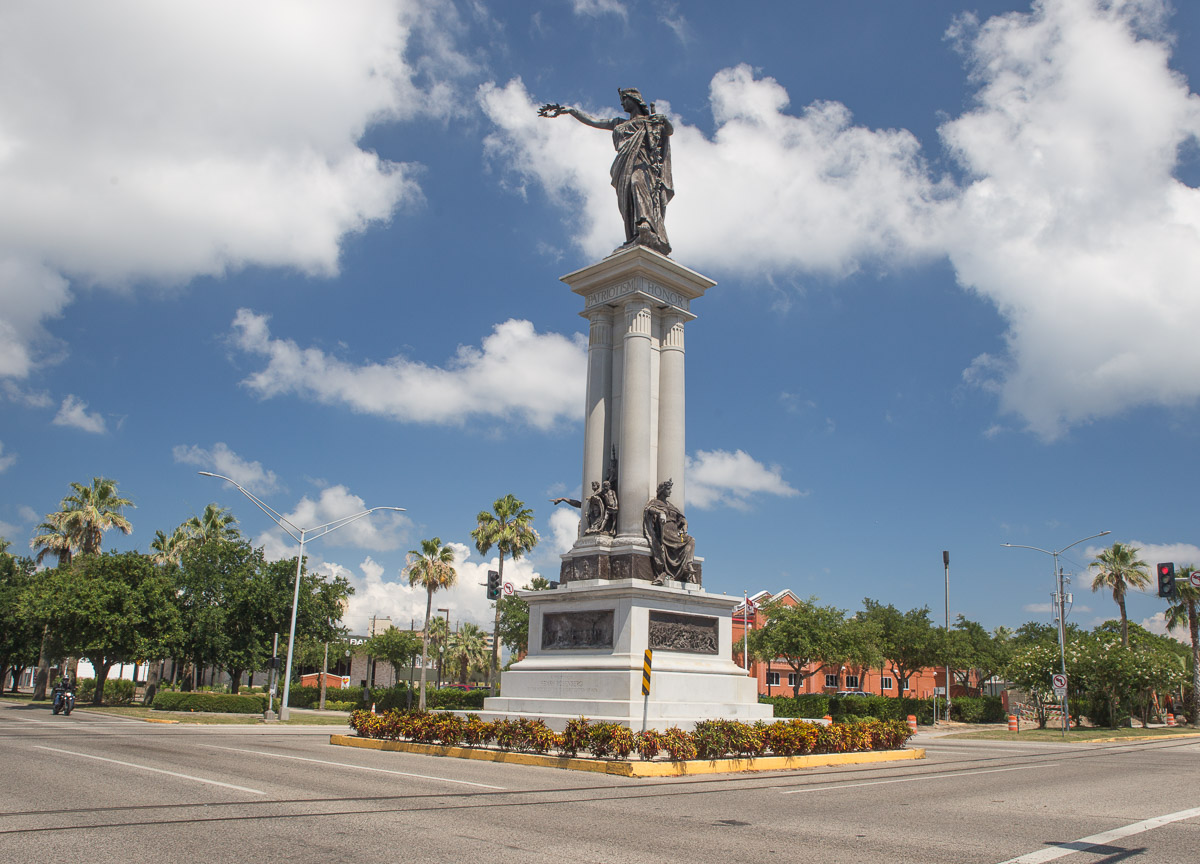
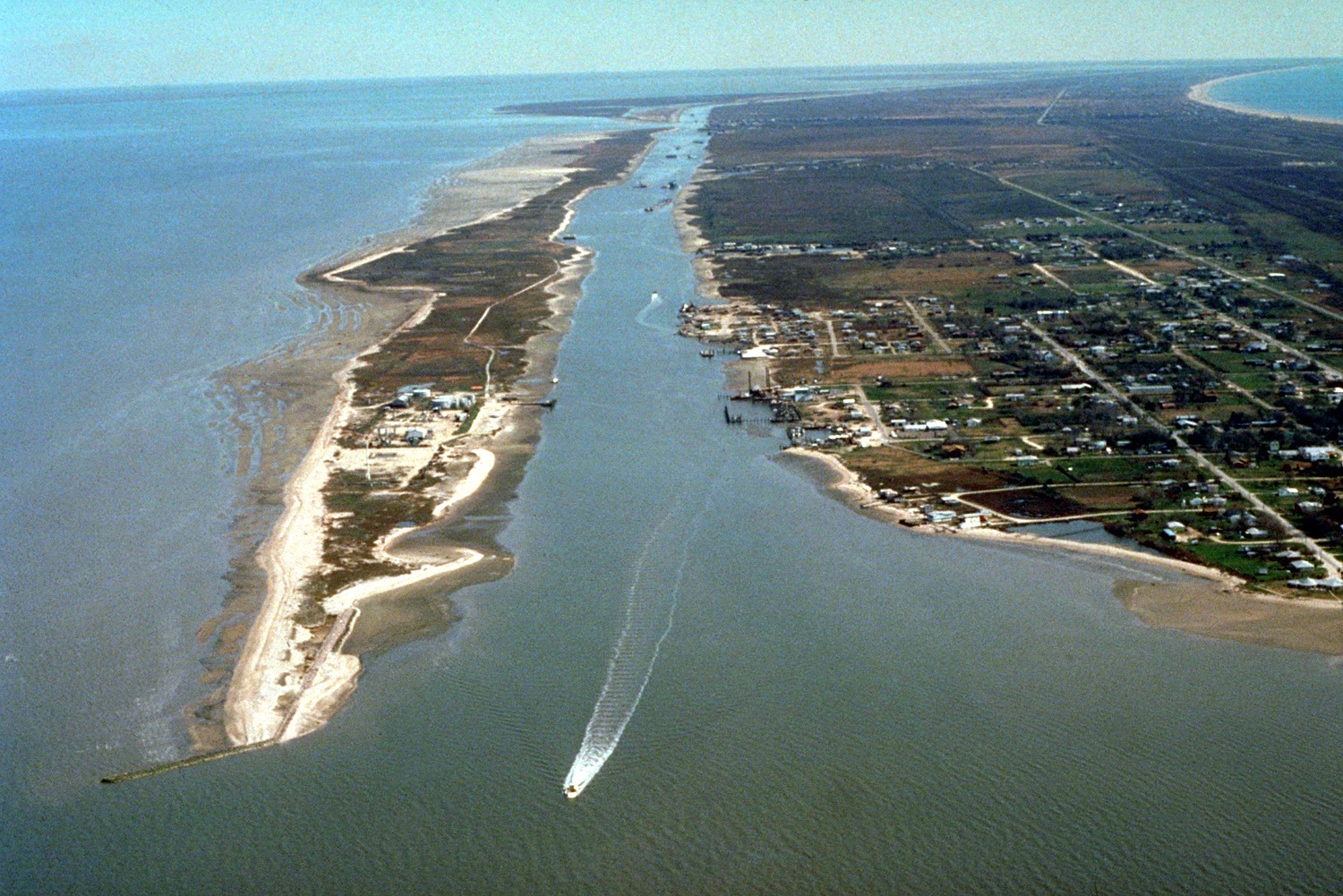
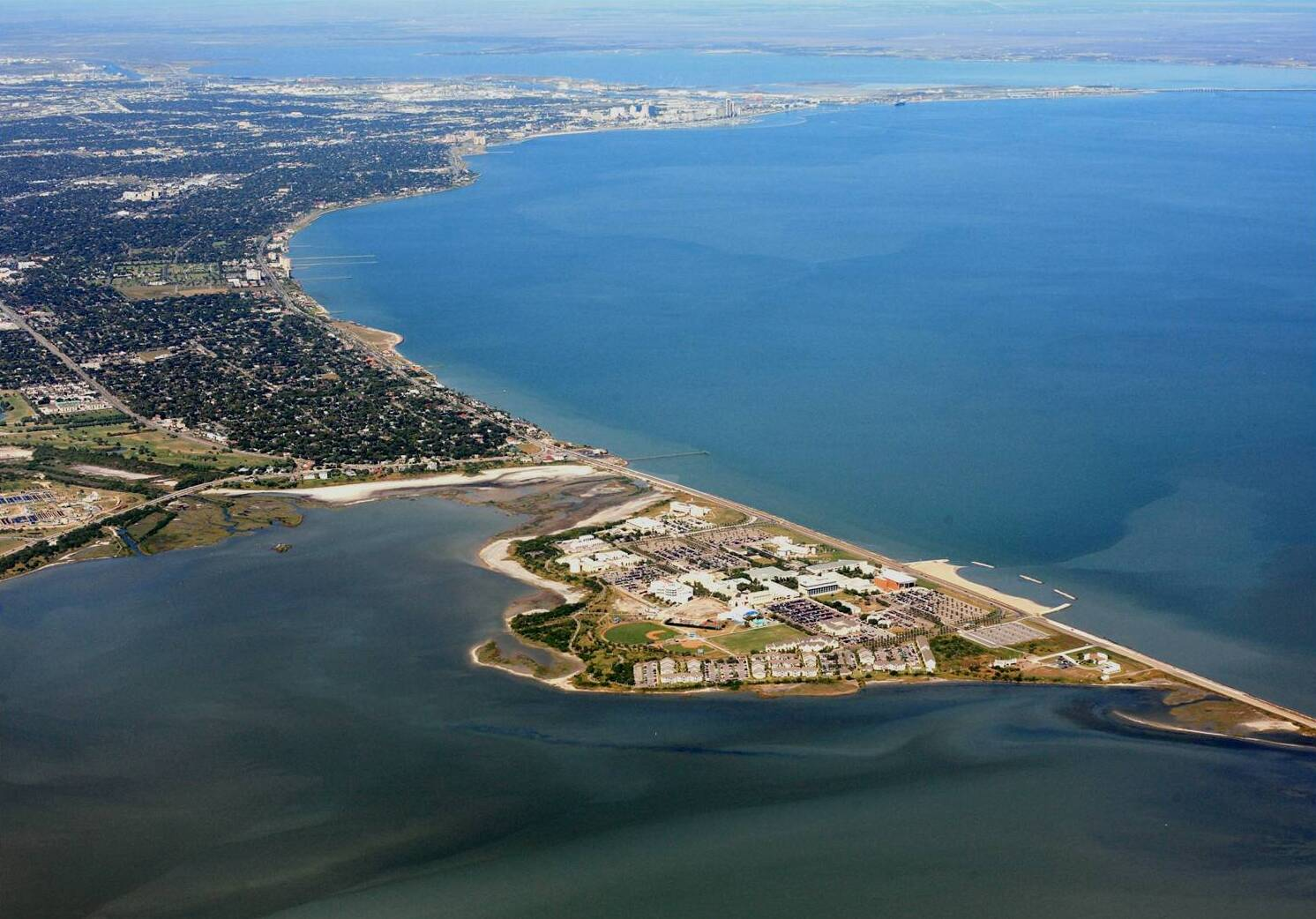
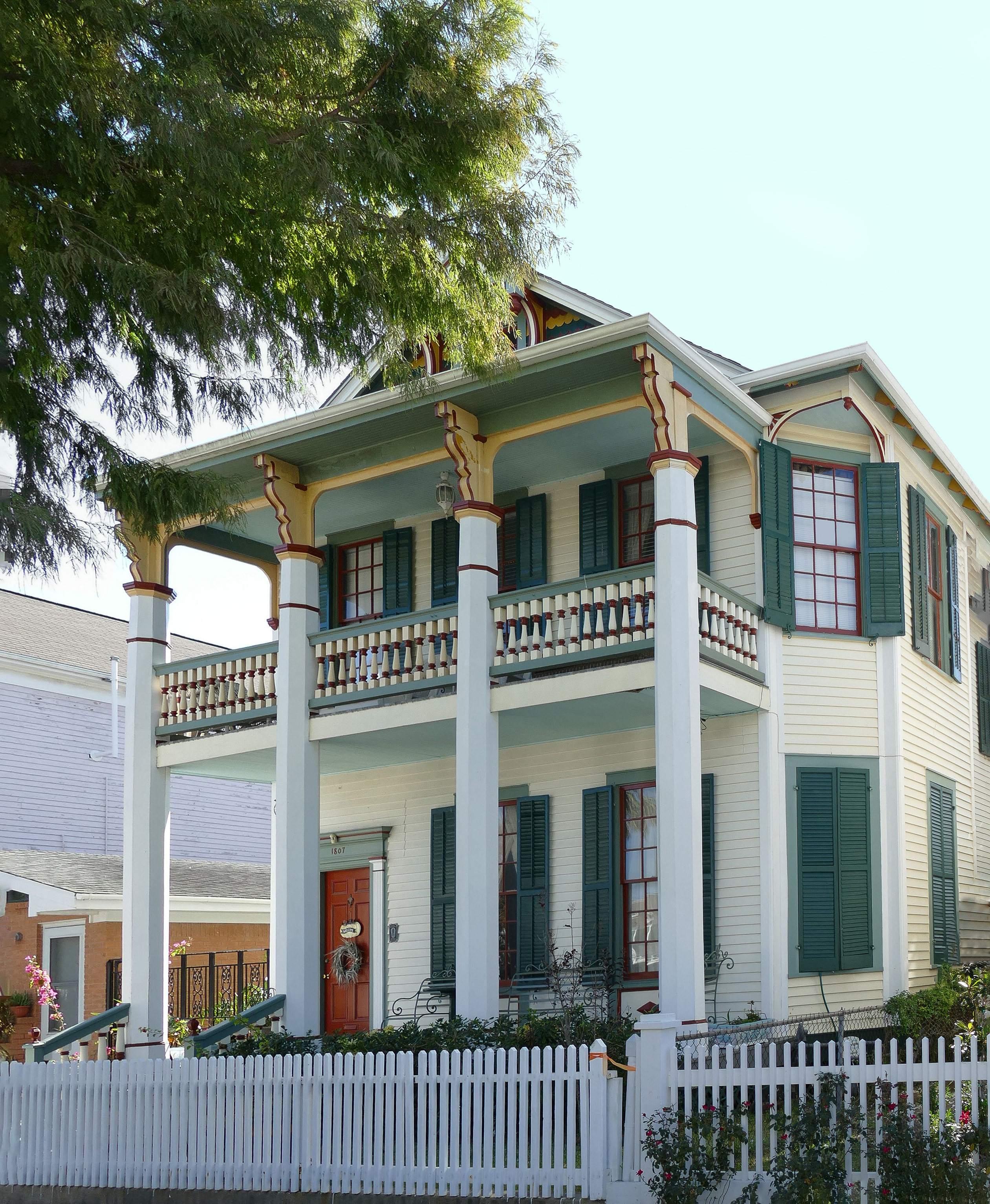
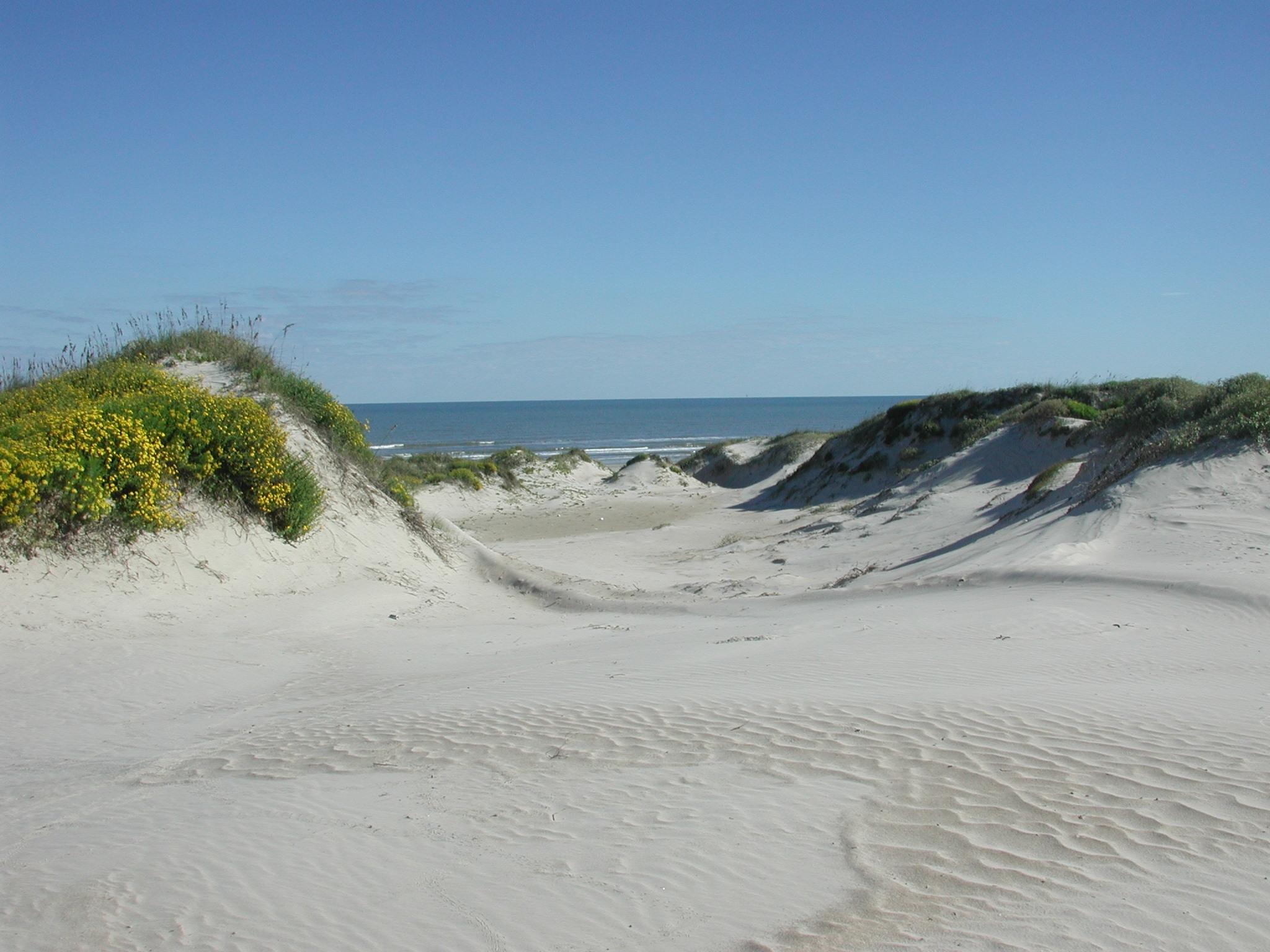
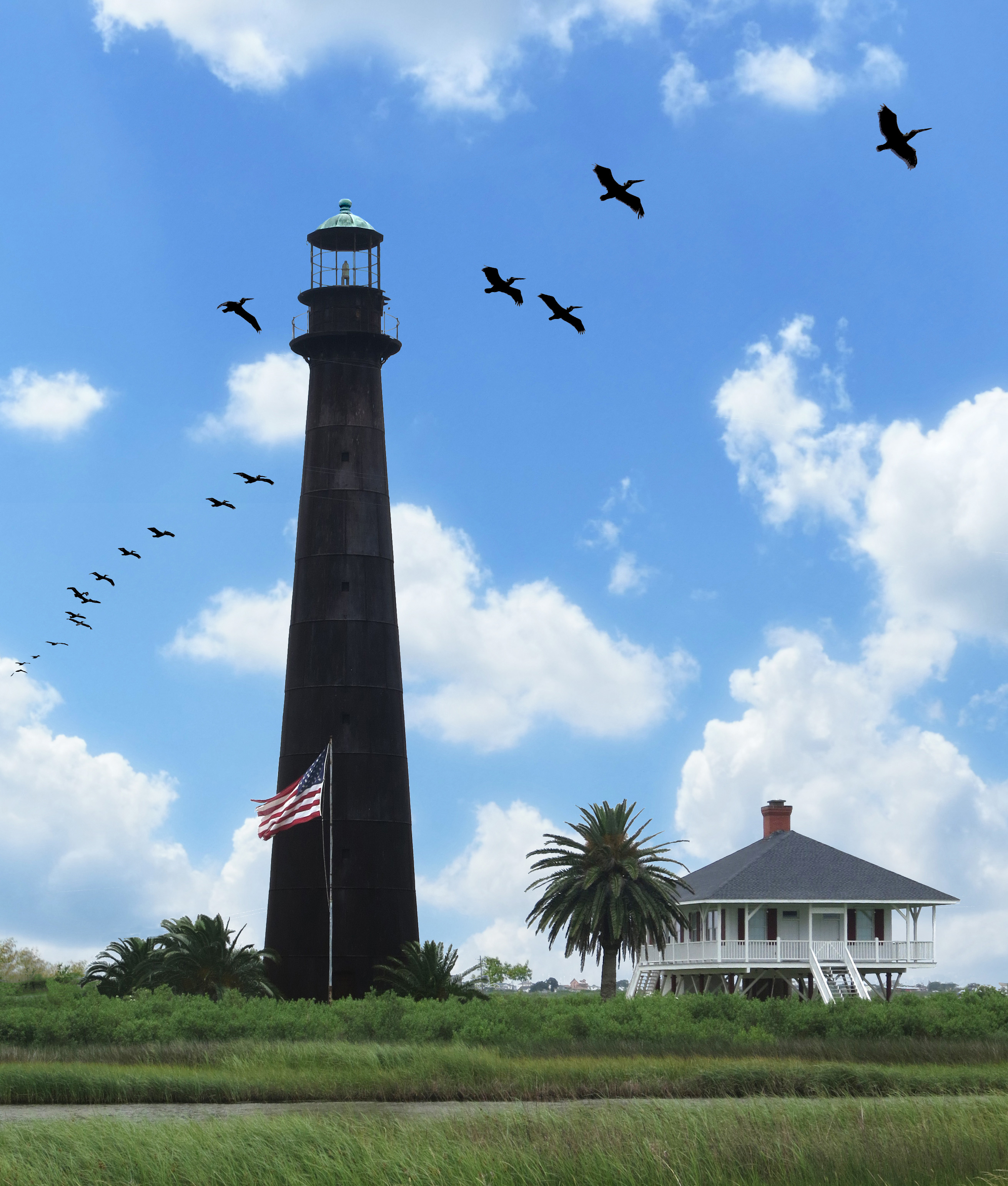
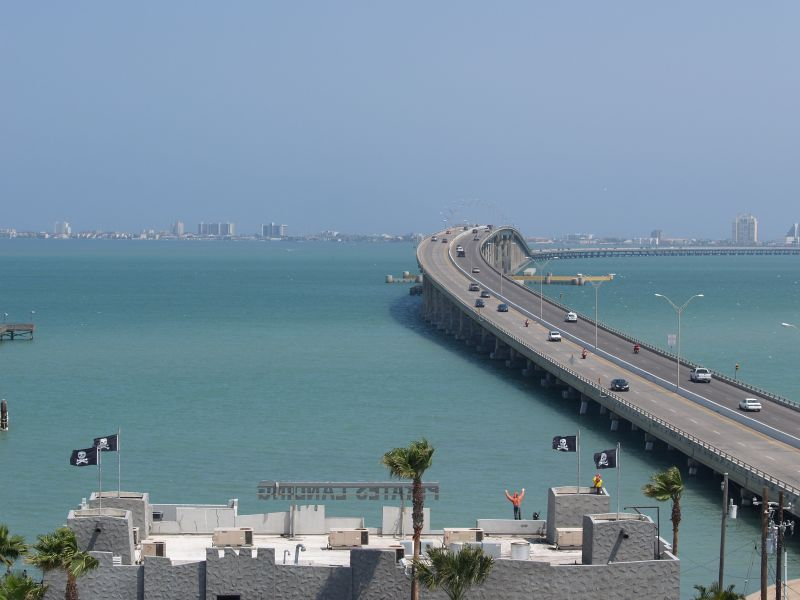
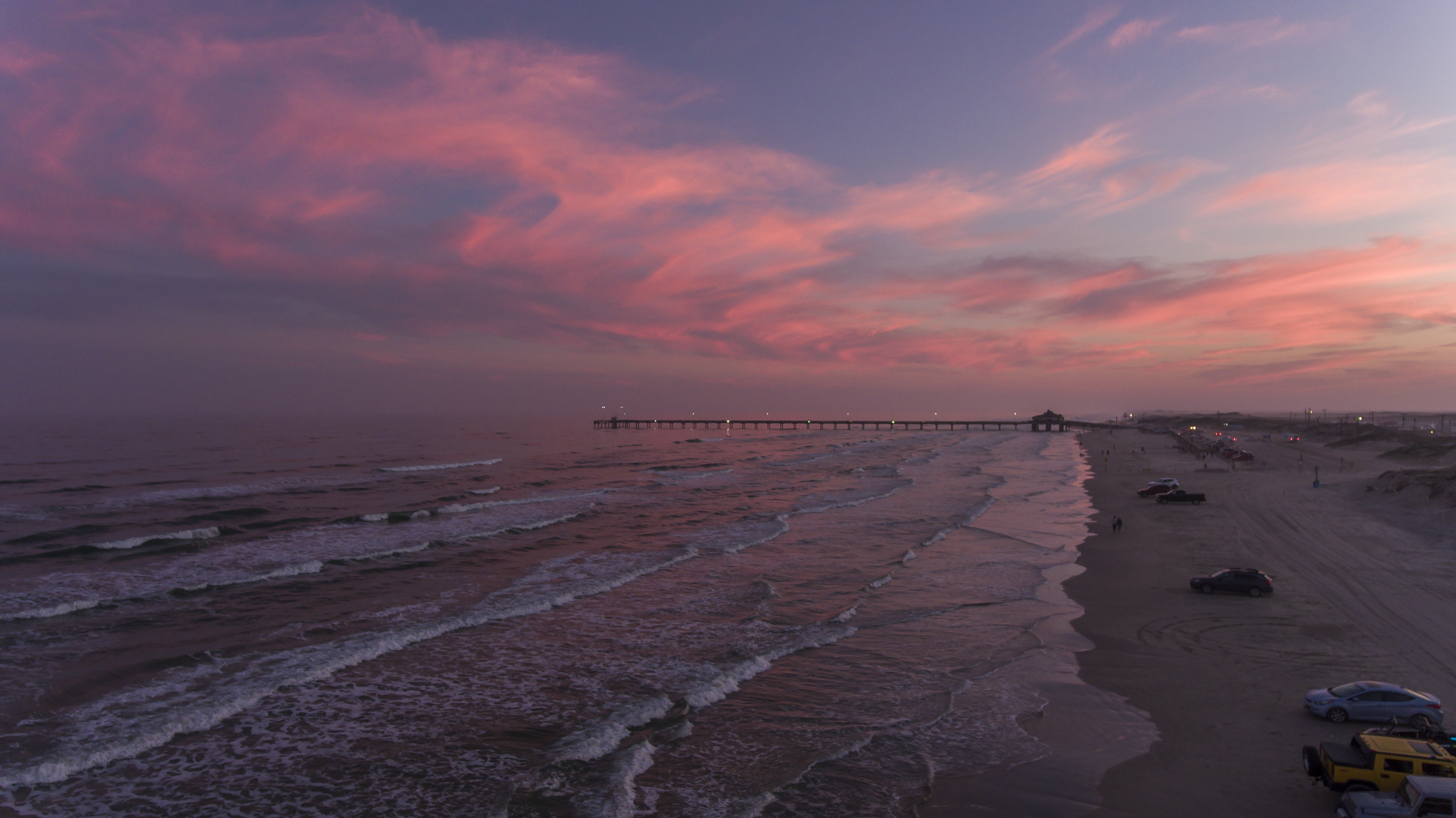

- Location within Texas
- Coordinates: 28.38477°N 96.38387°W
- Water bodies: Gulf of Mexico

Area
  - Total: 2,149,760 acres (869,980 ha)

Dimensions
  - Length: CRS ~ 367 miles (591 km); NOAA ~ 3,359 miles (5,406 km)
- Website: Texas Gulf Coast

Texas Gulf Coast is an intertidal zone which borders the coastal region of South Texas, Southeast Texas, and the Texas Coastal Bend. The Texas coastal geography boundaries the Gulf of Mexico encompassing a geographical distance relative bearing at 367 miles (591 km) of coastline according to CRS and 3,359 miles (5,406 km) of shoreline according to NOAA.

== Administrative divisions of Texas Gulf Coast ==
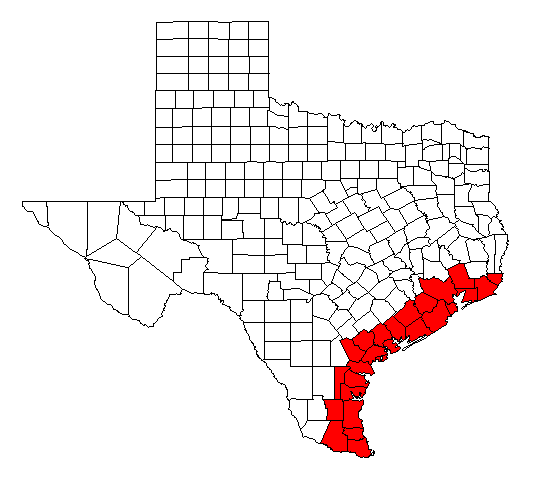
Counties of the Coastal Bend

There are 14 Texas counties encompassing the Gulf of Mexico coastal boundary;

Aransas	Kenedy
Brazoria	Kleberg
Calhoun	Matagorda
Cameron	Nueces
Chambers	Refugio
Galveston	San Patricio
Jefferson	Willacy

== Topography of Texas Gulf Coast ==
The Texas coastal bend sustains the Texas–Gulf water resource region as a hydrological cycle unifying a drainage basin of river deltas at the littoral zone of the Texas Gulf Coast.

Elevation on Texas Gulf Coast

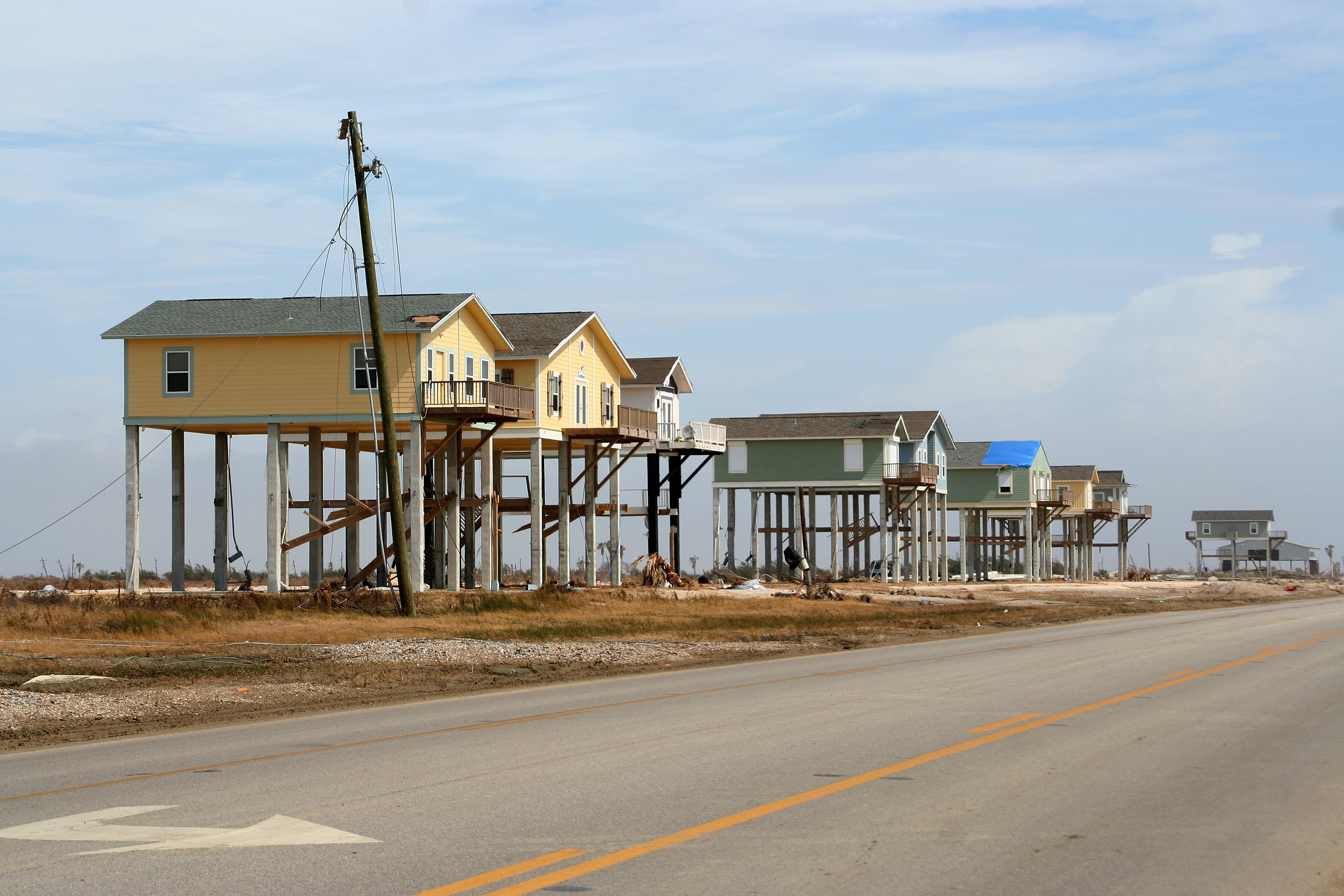
Timber pilings elevated for severe Atlantic hurricanes

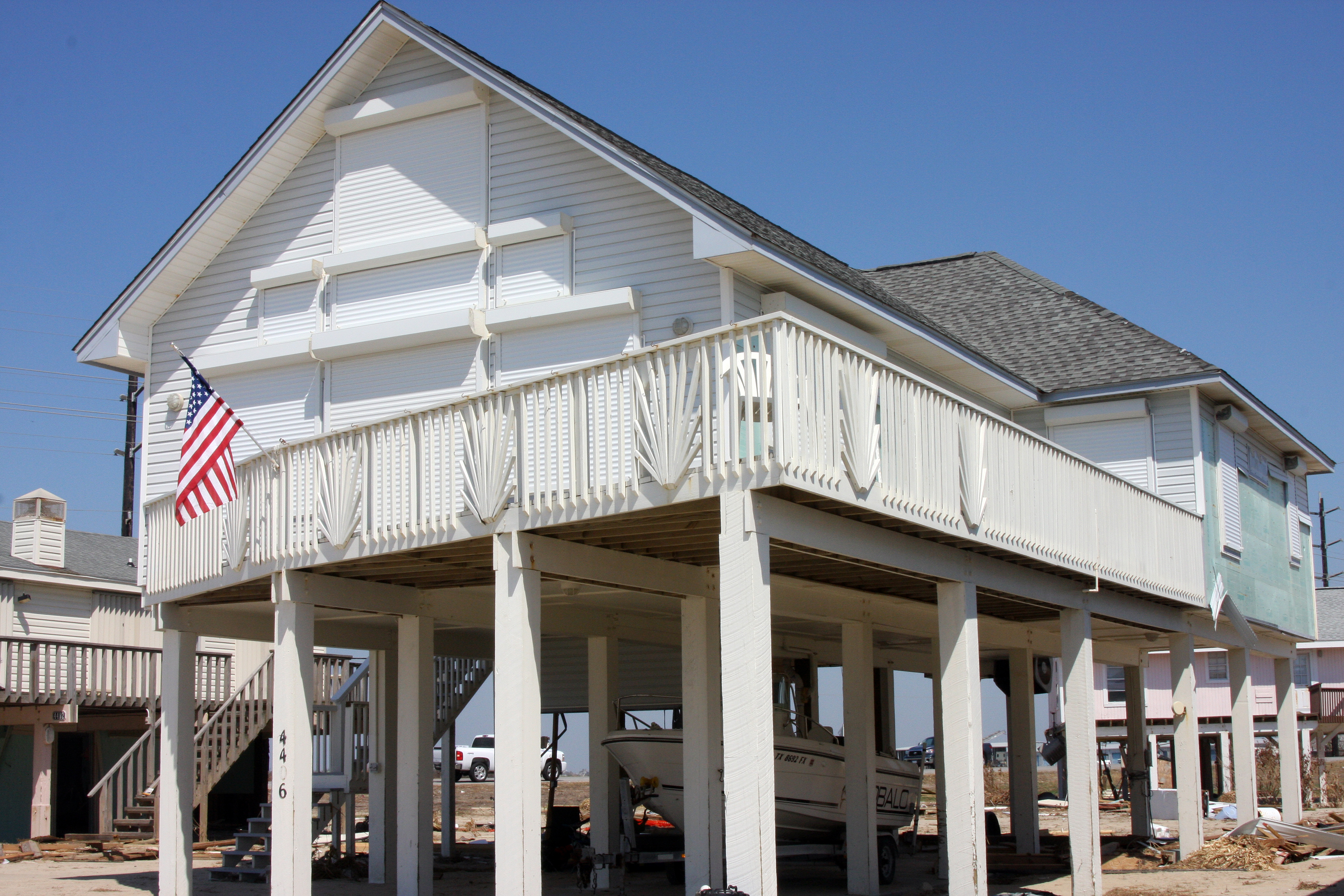
Stilt house to safeguard and oppose hazardous tropical storm surges

=== Texas coastal management and impact resiliency ===
In accordance with the Coastal Zone Management Act and Coastal Barrier Resources Act, the Texas Gulf shores maintain a coastal management program striving to prohibit coastal erosion, coastal hazards, sea-level rise, and tidal flooding. The Texas beach observed the initial coastal bulkhead and construction of the Galveston Seawall subsequently to the 1900 hurricane and 1915 hurricane levying a direct catastrophic impact at Galveston Island. The Texas surf exemplifies a coastal defence with a seawall at North Padre Island, retaining wall at South Padre Island, and a revetment at Sargent Beach.

Imagery of Texas Early 20th Century Hurricanes

- Media related to Galveston Hurricane of 1900 at Wikimedia Commons
- Media related to Galveston Hurricane of 1915 at Wikimedia Commons

=== Texas Gulf Bays and Coastal Waterways ===
Beginning in December 1845 concurrent to Texas annexation, the United States Congress authorized federal articles creating coastal collective districts judiciously orchestrating ports of delivery for the Texas Gulf Coast. The United States statutes were enacted into law by the 11th President of the United States James Polk.

U.S. Statutes for Texas Coastal Collection Districts

Date of Enactment	Public Law No.	Statute Citation	U.S. Presidential Administration
December 31, 1845	P.L. 29-2	9 Stat. 2	James K. Polk
March 3, 1847	P.L. 29-57	9 Stat. 182	James K. Polk
March 3, 1849	P.L. 30-122	9 Stat. 409	James K. Polk

The Texas gulf coast has a geography of ten coastal bays while naturally bountiful with waterway inlets;

Aransas Bay	Lavaca Bay
Baffin Bay	Matagorda Bay
Copano Bay	Redfish Bay
Corpus Christi Bay	San Antonio Bay
Galveston Bay	South Bay

=== Waterway inlets of Texas Barrier Islands ===
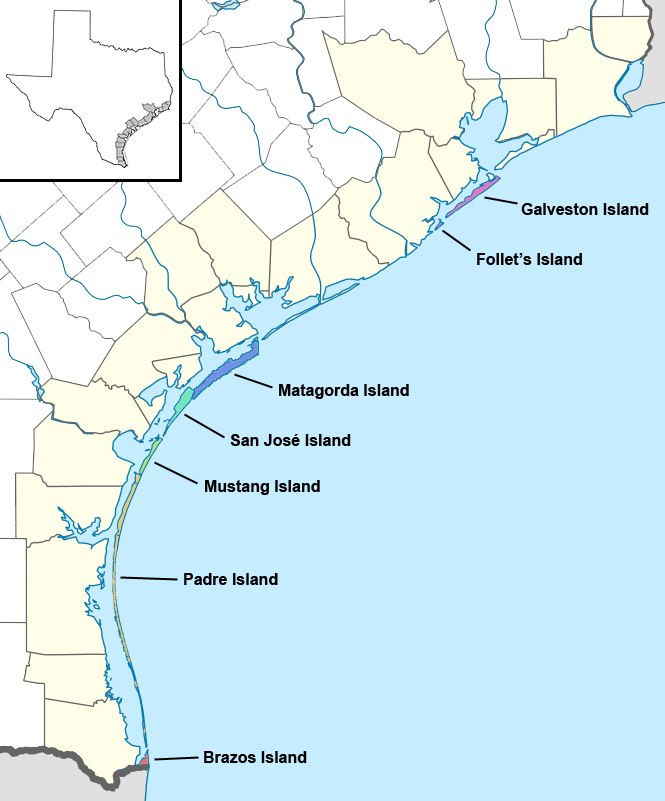
Texas barrier islands illustration

The Texas coastal bend has a geography of waterways fringed by the Texas barrier islands. The Texas seacoast is collectively multitudinal with navigable straits traversing watercraft access as a concourse to the Gulf Intracoastal Waterway and the Texas estuaries.

Aransas Pass	Freeport Channel28.93600°N 95.29645°W
Bolivar Roads	Matagorda Ship Channel
Brazos River Delta28.87855°N 95.38028°W	Packery Channel27.61440°N 97.20082°W
Brazos Santiago Pass	Port Mansfield Channel
Caney Creek Pass28.75305°N 95.65828°W	Rollover Pass
Cavallo Pass	Sabine Pass
Cedar Bayou Pass28.06381°N 96.85091°W	San Bernard Pass28.85207°N 95.44075°W
Cedar Lakes Pass28.81875°N 95.52153°W	San Luis Pass
Colorado River Delta28.59187°N 95.98328°W	Spring Bayou Pass28.61242°N 95.94006°W
Fish Pass27.67695°N 97.16578°W	Sunday Beach Pass28.35992°N 96.39941°W

=== National and state parks of Texas Gulf Shores ===
The Texas Parks and Wildlife Department oversees the Texas state parks located on the Gulf of Mexico shores with the exception of Padre Island seashore, which is maintained by the National Park Service.

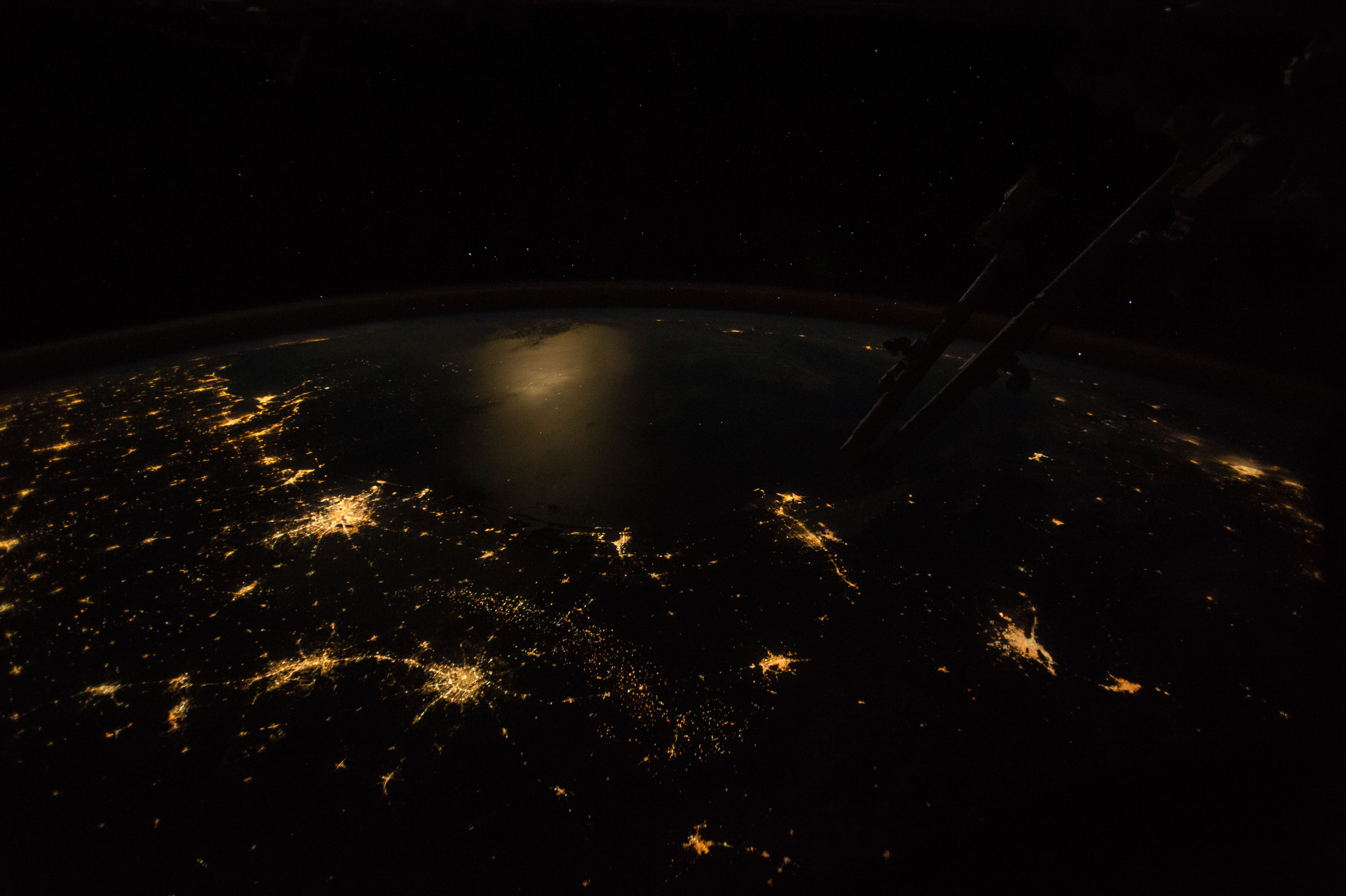
Satellite image illustrating Gulf of Mexico and Texas gulf coast during nightfall

Galveston Island State Park	Padre Island National Seashore
Goose Island State Park	Resaca de la Palma State Park
Mustang Island State Park	Sea Rim State Park

=== Nature sanctuaries of Texas Coastal Zones ===
The United States Fish and Wildlife Service governs the nature reserves as land parcels of the National Wildlife Refuge System bordering the Texas coastal zones.

Jocelyn Nungaray Wildlife Refuge	Lower Rio Grande Valley Wildlife Refuge
Aransas Wildlife Refuge	McFaddin Wildlife Refuge
Big Boggy Wildlife Refuge	Moody Wildlife Refuge
Brazoria Wildlife Refuge	San Bernard Wildlife Refuge
Laguna Atascosa Wildlife Refuge	Texas Point Wildlife Refuge

== Antiquity of Texas Gulf Coast ==
=== European Colonization of Texas Coast ===
Exploration of Texas Coast

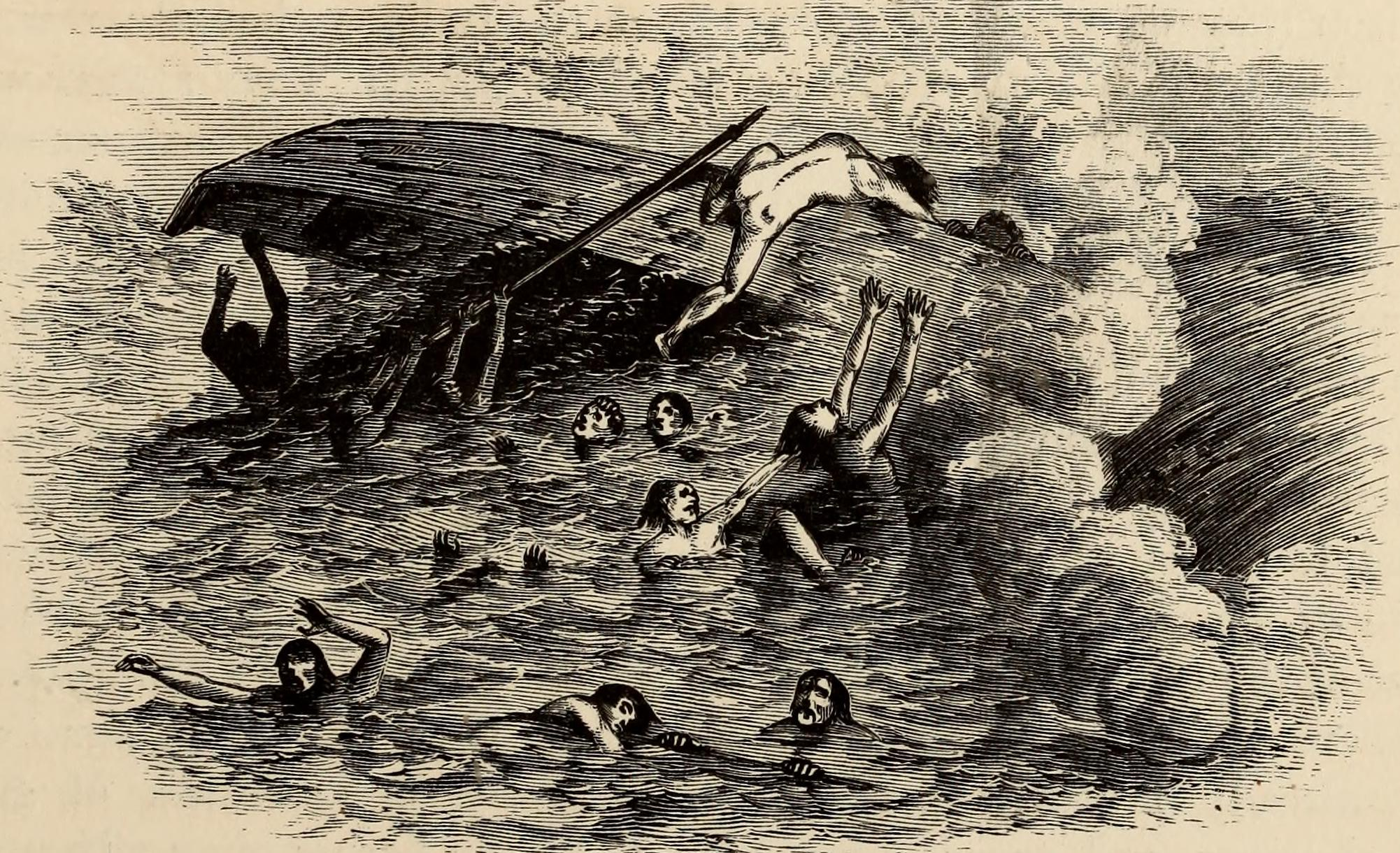
Illustration of turbulent surf and tidal landing by Álvar Núñez Cabeza de Vaca

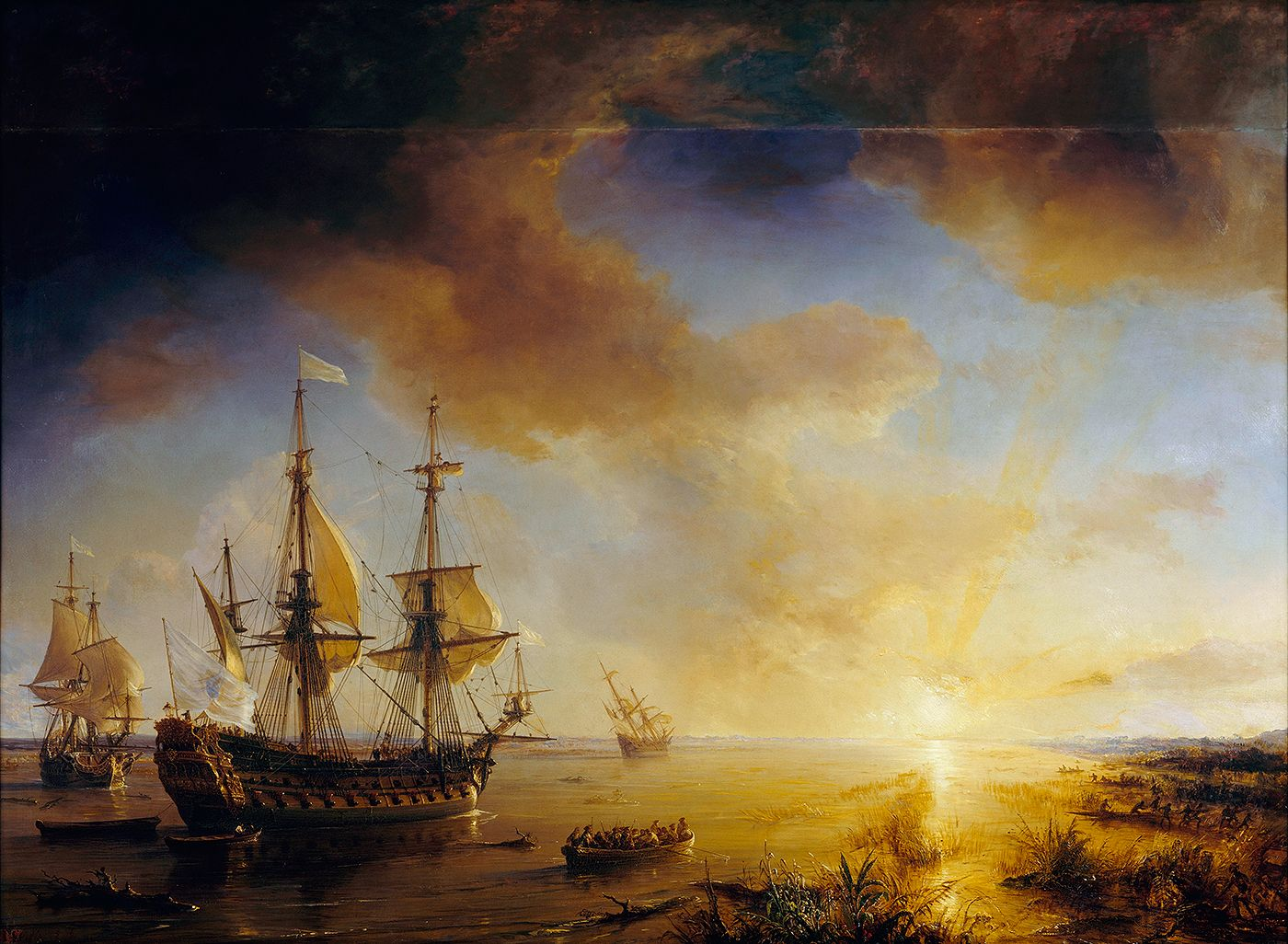
La Salle at Gulf of Mexico and inlet of Matagorda Bay

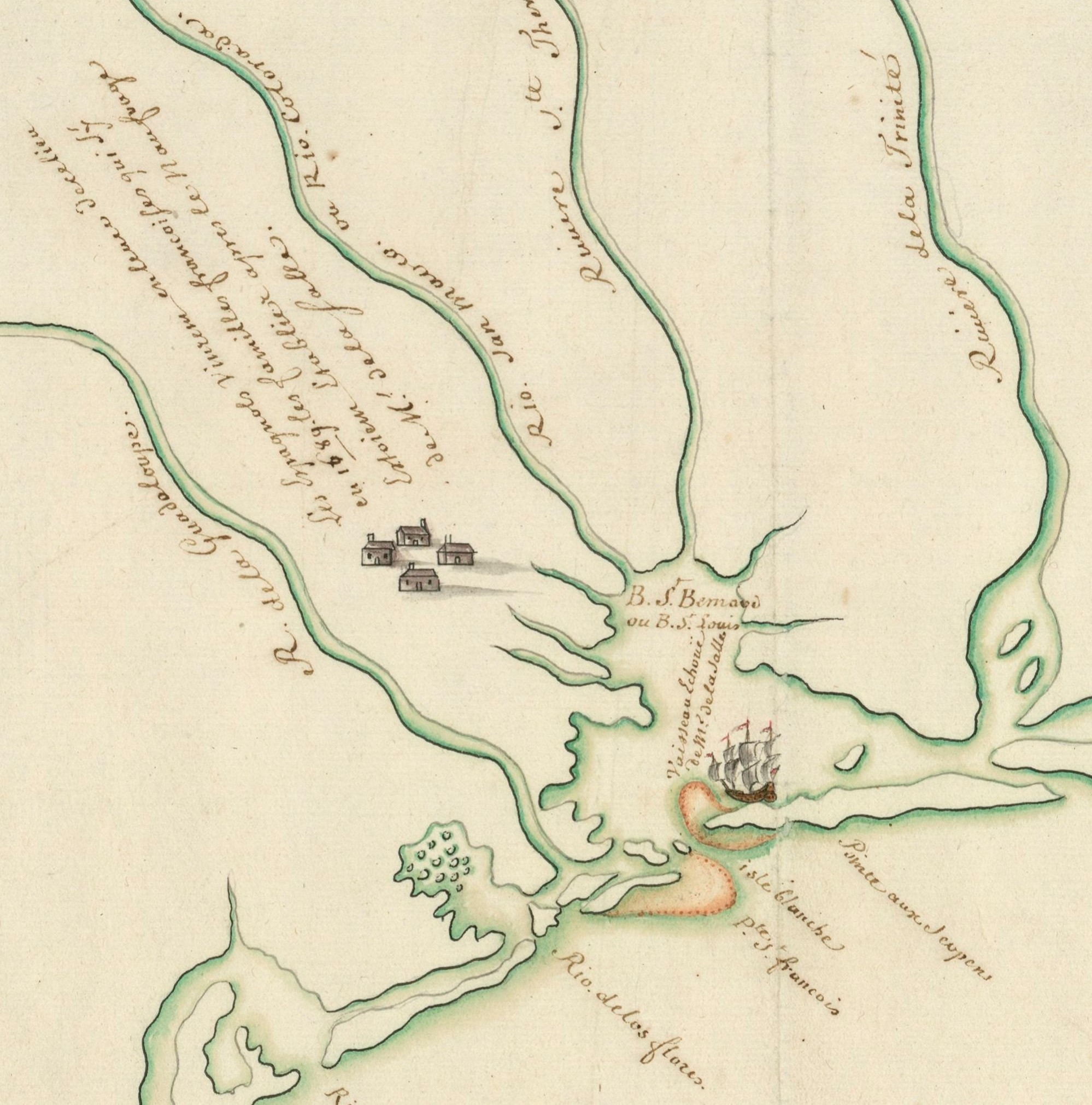
La Salle's settlement in 1686

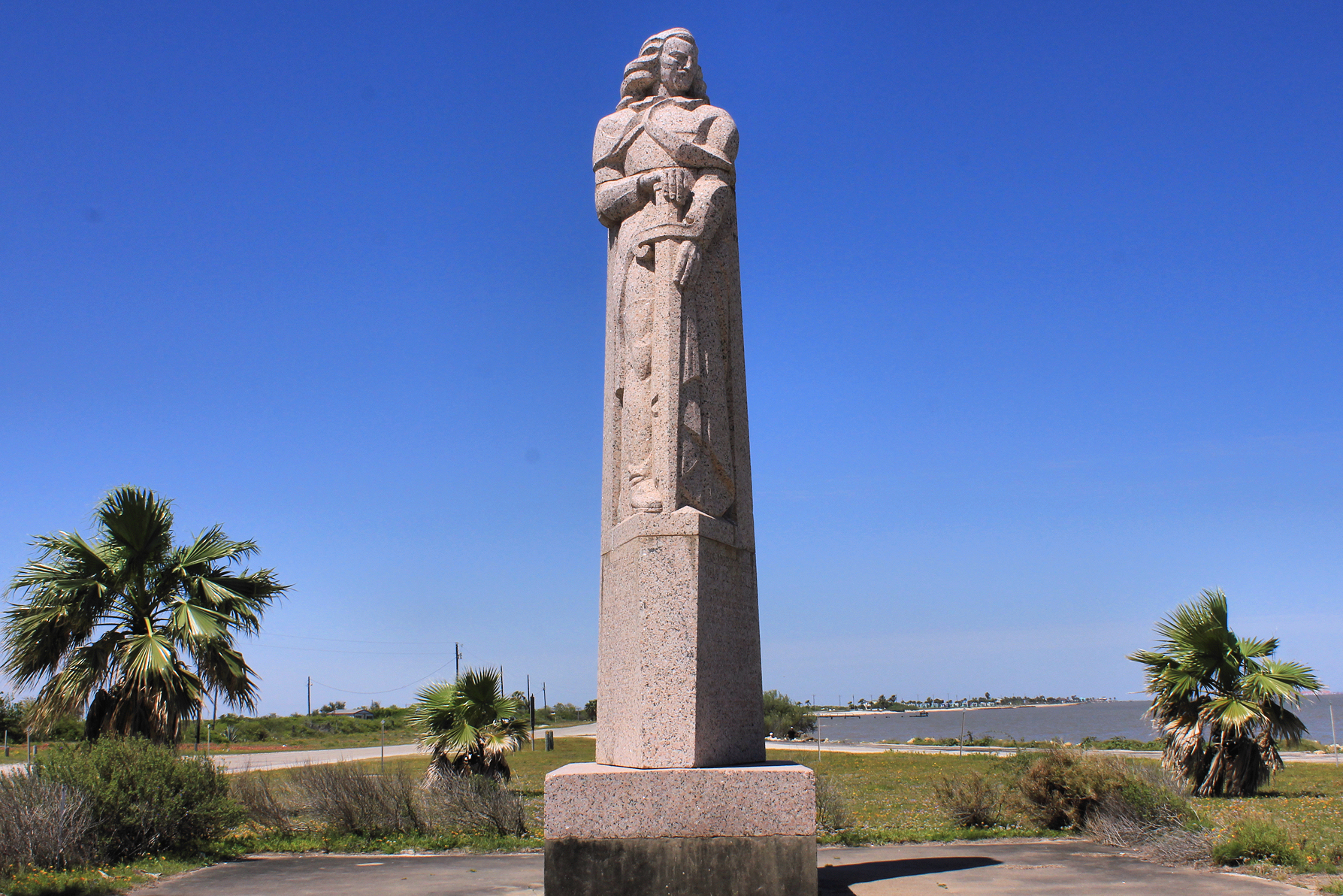
La Salle monument

North American expeditions and exploratory endeavors emerged with the Europeans engaging their efforts for transatlantic crossings during the late fifteenth century.

==== Exploration of Spanish Conquistador ====
The Texas marginal seacoast acknowledged the arrival or entradas of Álvar Núñez Cabeza de Vaca during the first quarter century of the 1500s. Cabeza de Vaca, a Spanish conquistador and a successor of Christopher Columbus, embarked on a calamitous coastal ship landing near the shore of Galveston Island on November 6, 1528.

==== New Spain economic currency and perils of Spanish Sea ====
In 1554, a Spanish cargo ship known as the San Esteban was tacking from Veracruz due north along the Texas Gulf Coast with an eastern destination at Havana and the West Indies. The New Spain galleon encountered a severe tropical cyclone in the Spanish Sea proximate the 27th parallel north and 97th meridian west decimating the Spanish treasure fleet known as Espiritu Santo, San Estaban, and Santa Maria de Yciar. The shipwreck derelict is entitled as a National Register of Historic Places. The underwater archaeology site was established as the Mansfield Cut Underwater Archeological District at Padre Island National Seashore in 1974.

==== Expedition of France Monarchy ====
The Texas oceanic basin was colonized by the France monarchy or Louis XIV from 1684 to 1689. In 1684, Robert Cavelier de La Salle sailing under the French ensigns guided an expedition in the Spanish Sea of four ships known as L'Aimable, La Belle, Le Joly, and St. François. La Salle and Henri de Tonti were pursuing the Mississippi River Delta seeking to discover the French colonial empire of New France. In 1685, La Salle navigated beyond the Atchafalaya Basin and lower Mississippi River basin inaccurately discovering Matagorda Bay where the French cargo vessels anchored near Indianola, Texas. During 1685 to 1689, the La Salle colonists adventured north of Lavaca Bay establishing a land settlement known as Fort St. Louis near Garcitas Creek and Inez, Texas ratifying the French colonization of Texas.

==== Spanish Empire and Transformation of North Americas ====
The Texas Gulf coast attested to a second wave of the European colonization of the Americas with the introduction of colonialism by the Spanish Empire in 1690. The España cultural evolution substantiated a christianization or religious conquest by the transatlantic crossing of the Spanish Inquisition. The España colonization established the Viceroyalty of New Spain administratively structuring an interior province known as Spanish Texas from 1690 to 1821. Beginning in 1810, the Mexican War of Independence was settled with the Spanish Empire ennobling a discontinuation of the Mexican Inquisition while creating the First Mexican Empire in 1821.

== History ==
=== French Corsairs of Gulf Waters and Texas Shores ===
The Texas Gulf coast served as a sanctuary for seafaring buccaneers, corsairs, privateers, and other practitioners of piracy during the Age of Sail. Galveston Bay and Matagorda Bay were the Texas coast fertile crescent for anchorage and concealment of the barque, barquentine, and brigantine class sailing vessels.

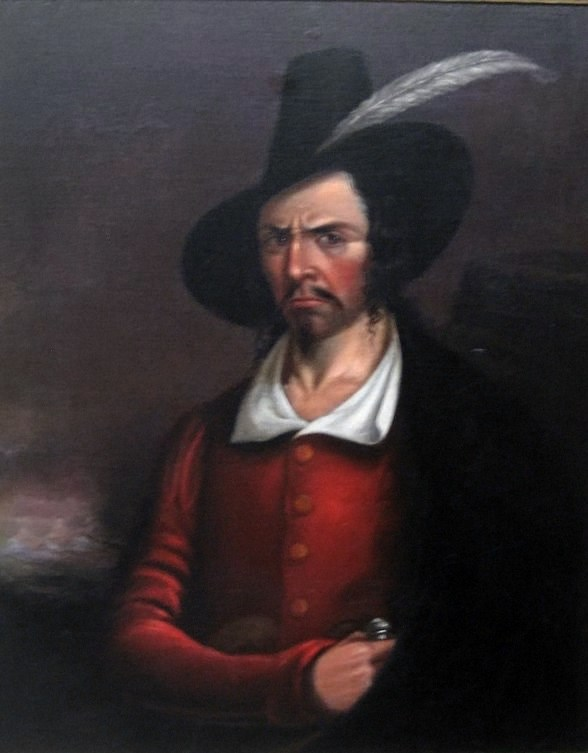
French pirate Jean Lafitte

In the early nineteenth century, Jean Lafitte and Pierre Lafitte, kinship of French basque and sea-going privateers, managed a modest metal forging establishment known as the Lafitte's Blacksmith Shop in the New Orleans French Quarter.

In 1807, the 10th United States Congress obtained a consensus on the Embargo Act of 1807. America's international relations legislation and Orders in Council of 1807 coerced the displacement of the Dominique You, Vincenzo Gambi, and Lafitte's piracy venture to Barataria, Louisiana geographically south of New Orleans within the Mississippi River Delta region. By 1808, the Lafittes' discovered brigandage to be an invaluable endeavor smuggling pirate booty from Barataria Bay to New Orleans.

In 1814, Jean Lafitte received a written appeal from Royal Marines officer Edward Nicolls beckoning loyalty for the Royal Navy breach at the Battle of New Orleans. On September 16, 1814, Commodore Daniel Patterson received orders to launch a naval offensive on the Baratarian's prize of war enterprise debilitating the Lafitte's French corsair sailing fleet.

Baratarians and Lafitte Piracy Haven

Isle Grande Terre at Barataria Bay, Louisiana

After the remnants of the War of 1812, Jean Lafitte departed Grand Terre Island and the wetlands of Louisiana setting the sails for Galveston Island, Texas. The French Corsair's Galveston Island arrival was an antecedent to the 1816 Galveston inhabitants of Francisco Xavier Mina and Louis-Michel Aury. In early 1817, freebooter Jean Lafitte established a piracy colony at Galveston Island where the infamous Maison Rouge was built for his domicile.

Lafitte constructed the Maison Rouge structure perpendicular of the Galveston Channel and Pelican Island with the surroundings of a corsair's piracy settlement. The Brethren of the Coast discovered the Galveston landscape to be conducive for passage to the gulf waters supporting sailing ship tactics to intercept merchant ships and Spanish Empire armadas accomplishing the nautical journey from the Old World.

After the Galveston Hurricane of 1818, French privateer Lafitte abandoned Galveston Bay for the Bay of Campeche beseeching safe conduct at the cays of Campeche Bank. By 1821, the Texas seacoast exodus was resolutely coerced by the authorization of the 15th United States Congress legislative article known as the Piracy Suppression Act of 1819 enacted into law by United States President James Monroe on March 3, 1819.

In 1927, Galveston's William Moody Jr. erected the Jean Lafitte Hotel in the Galveston's Strand Historic District in recognition of Lafitte's origins on the Galveston Island shores.

=== Mexico Governance, Texas Revolution, and Republic of Texas ===
The first stirrings of the Texas Revolution began with the Fredonian Rebellion, occurring from 1826 to 1827 in the East Texas vicinity of Nacogdoches, Texas.

In 1825, the First Mexican Republic sanctioned Stephen F. Austin's second empresario contract of 1825 validating the Galveston strand as a customs entry point and provisional maritime port.

==== Guide to the Austin's Colony Records, 1823-1841 ====
Coahuila y Tejas and Stephen F. Austin's Empresario Contract of 1825

Stephen F. Austin's Second Empresario Contract, 7/15/1825

☆ 1825 Second Empresario Contract Summary

Stephen F. Austin's 1825 colonization contract with the state of Coahuila and Texas, with copies of the following documents:

◇ Austin's petition to the supreme executive power requesting permission to settle 200-300 families in the area of his first colony and to establish a town on Galveston Island or at some other point on Galveston Bay suitable for a port (11/6/1824)

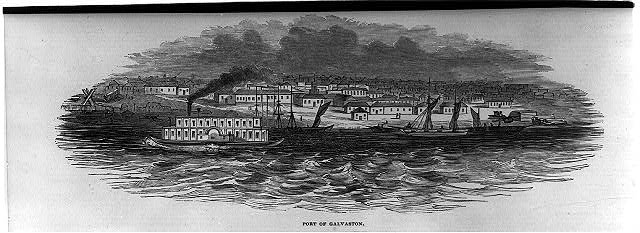
Port of Galveston Ca. 1845

◇ A communication from Austin to the governor of Coahuila and Texas concerning settlers bound for his colony that had remained on the Trinity and Neches rivers and his proposal to locate settlers near the San Antonio Road to counter American indian incursions, and remitting a small map of Galveston Island and bay with the promise to send a more exact map at a later date (2/4/1825)

◇ Governor Rafael Gonzáles to Austin consenting to the settlement of 300 families and specifying the terms and conditions of the contract (4/27/1825)

◇ Austin's acceptance of the terms and conditions of the contract (6/4/1825)

◇ Austin's communication to the governor asking permission to settle 500 families (including on Galveston Island) and requesting the enactment of a law guaranteeing the settlers' ownership of their slaves (4/4/1825)

◇ The governor's consent to locate 500 families in the area designated in Austin's contract and notice that the matters pertaining to the establishment of a port at Galveston and to the introduction of slaves was the purview of the Mexican Congress (5/20/1825)

◇ This copy made by Juan Antonio Padilla on 7/15/1825.

― Resource:

Texas Archival Resources Online (TARO)
Texas General Land Office ~ Archives and Records Program - Austin, Texas
University of Texas Libraries ~ University of Texas at Austin

In 1830, First Mexican Republic introduces the initial Galveston Custom house preferably referred as the Old Galveston Customhouse. The Mexican Republic customs were administered under the authority of Army of the Three Guarantees collecting custom duties at the Port of Galveston. In 1831, Mexican Commander Manuel de Mier y Terán appointed Jorge Fisher as the customs agent for the Galveston maritime port of entry.

The East End Historic District is illustrative of the Beaux-Arts, Greek Revival, and Victorian style architectures at Galveston Island. The Strand Historic District is a few city blocks from the Old Galveston Custom House. The East End Historic District emergence is declared by the Texas Heroes Monument situated as a victory column at the intersection of Broadway and twenty-fifth street. Galveston Island was prized territory as disclosed by the governance of Spanish America and occupancy of Spanish Texas sometimes referred as Coahuila y Tejas.

After the conflict of cultural imperialism ceased between Mexico and Spain, the Law of April 6, 1830 and Treaty of Limits furthered the successive uniformity known as Mexican Texas from 1828 to 1836.

In 1836, Texas independence was expeditiously declared from the imperialism of Mexico subsequently to the San Felipe de Austin and Texian Consultation events;

Conflict Events and Diplomatic Concords for Republic of Texas

☆ Captivity of Antonio López de Santa Anna at Galveston Bay

☆ Cessation of the Battle of San Jacinto at Galveston Bay

☆ Convention of 1836 at Washington-on-the-Brazos

☆ Endorsement of Texas Declaration of Independence

☆ Ratification of Constitution of the Republic of Texas

☆ Repeal of 1824 Constitution of Mexico

☆ Treaties of Velasco at Fort Velasco

☆ Armistice of 1843 and peace negotiations with Mexico

☆ Texas annexation on December 29, 1845

☆ Mexican-American War of 1846 to 1848 devised by the United States to sequester the Republic of Mexico depredations within the Texas territory

☆ Treaty of Guadalupe Hidalgo establishes the United States and Mexican Boundary Commission appointed to define the Mexico–United States border. The Texas thirty-first parallel to twenty-sixth parallel north latitude boundary encompasses the Rio Grande river at approximately 850 miles (1,368 km) vitally diversified by the arid mountainous vista of the Texas Big Bend.

The 1848 international law was substantiated in 1855 by the guardianship of William Emory who provision the International Boundary Marker No. 1, U.S. and Mexico. In 1889, Mexico and United States organized the International Boundary and Water Commission governing the international boundary markers provided the meander of the Rio Grande geographical embankments and river channel.

and the forthcoming establishment and separation of powers for the Republic of Texas.

=== Mexican State Naval Operations and Texas Gulf Coast ===
The Texas Gulf Coast provided a naval supply lifeline for the Texian Army and Texian Militia during the Texas Revolution sustaining from 1835 to 1836. The Texian Navy sustained the Texian revolutionary infantry forces by providing a flotilla for the safe passage of munitions and supply provisions. The Mobile and New Orleans harbors routing merchant ships defined a vast maritime area for the Texas Navy skirting the Texas seacoast while surveilling the Mexican state nautical hostilities and naval warfare on the Third Coast.

The Mexican Navy enforced coastline patrols and naval blockades of the Texas Gulf Coast harbors during the strife for Texas independence. The Texas naval forces appropriated four man-of-war schooners as a naval offensive for the sailing ship tactics of the Mexican Navy. The Texas Navy engaged four warships from 1835 to 1838 known as Brutus, Independence, Invincible, and Liberty for the establishment of the Republic of Texas.

=== Infectious Disease Epidemic and Texas Seacoast ===
During the nineteenth century, the Texas coastal counties encountered a disease vector which inflicted an arbovirus on the Texas ocean front townships. The pathogen transmission was potentially infiltrating the trade ports through merchant ships, nautical vessels, and seafaring watercraft along the Texas coastline. The predatorial Aedes aegypti yield a mosquito-borne disease aggressively disseminating an infection known as yellow fever on the South Texas civil parishes from the nineteenth century to the early twentieth century.

Broadway Cemetery Historic District served as burial grounds for the Texas coastal inhabitants subjected to the exposure of the yellow fever viral disease. The historic consecrated grounds are an epitome of the case fatality rates and communicable infection rates where the coastal populace was afflicted by the arbovirus epidemic at Galveston, Texas from 1839 to 1900.

In 1910, the Galveston municipality commenced a public project to provision electricity and water amenities for the immigration and life-saving stations at Galveston, Texas. The public works was endorsed by the 61st United States Congress passing the Galveston Channel Cable Act of 1910 as House bill 20988 on May 17, 1910.

On April 26, 1926, the United States Government by orientation of the 69th United States Congress passed Senate bill 3287 petitioning the State of Texas for the purchase of quarantine stations domiciled on the Texas Gulf Coast.

==== Texas Infectious Disease Sites by Texas Historical Commission ====
- "Galveston Immigration Stations – Galveston County ~ Marker Number: 7469". Texas Historic Sites Atlas. Texas Historical Commission. 1993.
- "Galveston Quarantine Stations – Galveston County ~ Marker Number: 7474". Texas Historic Sites Atlas. Texas Historical Commission. 1993.
- "Yellow Fever Epidemic of 1862 – Matagorda County ~ Marker Number: 18121". Texas Historic Sites Atlas. Texas Historical Commission. 2015.
- "Huntsville Yellow Fever Epidemic of 1867 – Walker County ~ Marker Number: 18491". Texas Historic Sites Atlas. Texas Historical Commission. 2016.
- "Yellow Fever Epidemic of 1867 – Fayette County ~ Marker Number: 18523". Texas Historic Sites Atlas. Texas Historical Commission. 2016.

=== United States National Security of Texas Gulf Coastline ===
The Texas Gulf coast had a vital necessity for seacoast defense as the international relations of superiority cultivated during the late 19th century to the mid-20th century. The United States artillery installations were erected during the Spanish–American War frequently referred as Cuban War of Independence, and relatively to the world war periods of the 1910s and 1940s.

The Texas coastal artillery command posts were established as casemates or pillboxes developed with reinforced concrete strategically situated at Bolivar Peninsula, Texas and Galveston Island, Texas. The United States Army Coast Artillery Corps commanded the operations of the coastal artillery emplacements which originated as Fort Crockett, Fort San Jacinto, Fort Travis, and inclusion of Sabine Pass. The artillery fortifications achieved the purposes of economic warfare or embargo for Galveston Bay, vigilance of maritime security, and safeguarding the trade routes for Port of Galveston and the Port of Houston.

Imagery of Texas Gulf Coast Fortress Installations

- Media related to Fort Crockett at Galveston Island at Wikimedia Commons
- Media related to Fort San Jacinto at Galveston Island East Point at Wikimedia Commons
- Media related to Fort Travis at Bolivar Peninsula at Wikimedia Commons
- Media related to Sabine Pass at Gulf of Mexico & Sabine River at Wikimedia Commons

== 20th century ==
=== Vietnamese refugees ===
At the end of the Vietnam War in 1975, came the first wave of refugees to flee but it was during the week of April 25th to the 1st of May. A year later in 1976, there were Indochina refugees residing in all states and even American Samoa, District of Columbia, and Puerto Rico. The leading state with the most refugees was California and the second was Texas with 11,000 refugees. The American unemployment rate during this time was 9-percent, and the refugees were considered a threat to the American workforce. In 1976 a poll was created to find the consensus on how Americans felt about refugees staying in America. This poll is known as the, Gallup Poll, and if found that 54-percent of American felt that the refugees should not be allowed to remain in the United States. For the Indochina refugees this made integrating more difficult as there were language barriers, their networks dwindled as they were separated by state lines and how they were portrayed in the media. There were also refugee camps throughout the United States. These both helped and hindered their integration into America. Soon the narrative surrounding the arrivals of the refugees became one that painted them as immigrants rather than a refugee and even the media had picked up on the Knights of the Ku Klux Klan's (KKKK) rhetoric of painting them as communists.

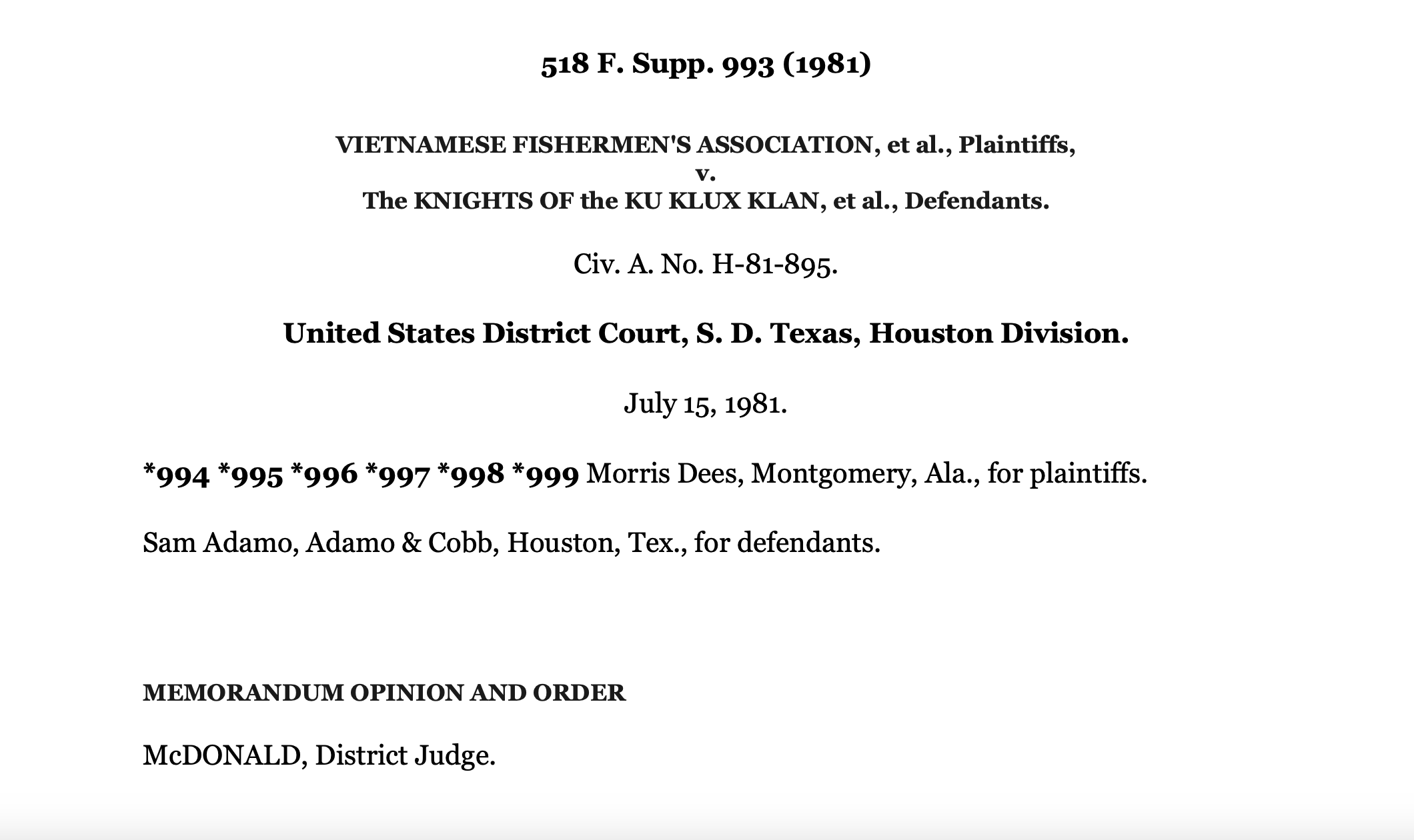
The first page of, Vietnamese Fishermen's Association V Knights of the Ku Klux Klan in 1982

After the Vietnam War, 100 Vietnamese refugees were placed in Seadrift, Texas. At the time the city was composed of only 1,000 people and their local economy heavily relied on fishing for shrimp and crab. Upon the arrival of the Vietnamese refugees, they used their skills of fishing to integrate into America and have an income. The refugees did not know the English language, nor the fishing laws for the region. The white fisherman in Seadrift became angry with the refugees as they were not following the legal guidelines to fish. Louis Beam and the Texas Klansmen joined forces with the white fisherman to enforce laws that they felt the government was not enforcing and to address their goals of fighting communism on American soil. In doing so, the Klansmen and white fishermen took to the ocean with military grade firearms and pointed them at the refugees both in water and on land. This prompted the Vietnamese Fishermen's Association to take legal action against Louis Beam and those involved in the violence and harassment of the Vietnamese refugees in the Gulf of Texas in 1982. The judge, Gabrielle McDonald handled the case. She ruled in favor of the Vietnamese Fishermen's Association.

== See also ==
Flower Garden Banks National Marine Sanctuary	Rigs-to-Reefs
Free State of Galveston	SS Oaxaca (1942 Steamboat)
Hannah Elizabeth (ship)	S.V. Cynthia Woods (2008 Capsize)
Harte Research Institute for Gulf of Mexico Studies	San Felipe incident (1835)
International Pageant of Pulchritude	University of Texas Marine Science Institute
Laura (1835 steamboat)	World Birding Center

== Bibliography ==
- Weddle, Robert S. (1985). Spanish Sea: the Gulf of Mexico in North American Discovery, 1500–1685. College Station, Texas: Texas A&M University Press. ISBN 978-1585440665. OCLC 11468026.
- Weddle, Robert S. (1991). The French Thorn: Rival Explorers in the Spanish Sea, 1682-1762. College Station, Texas: Texas A&M University Press. ISBN 978-0890964804. OCLC 23286547.
- Weddle, Robert S. (1995). Changing Tides: Twilight and Dawn in the Spanish Sea, 1763-1803. College Station, Texas: Texas A&M University Press. ISBN 978-0890966617. OCLC 32202575.
- Francaviglia, Richard V. (1998). From Sail to Steam: Four Centuries of Texas Maritime History, 1500-1900. Austin, Texas: University of Texas Press. ISBN 978-0292723054. OCLC 36548957.
- Davis, William C. (2006). The Pirates Laffite: The Treacherous World of the Corsairs of the Gulf. Orlando, Florida: Houghton Mifflin Harcourt. ISBN 978-0547350752. OCLC 68570266.
- Williams, C. Herndon (2010). Texas Gulf Coast Stories. Charleston, South Carolina: Arcadia Publishing. ISBN 978-1614232469. OCLC 664519681.
- Winningham, Geoff (2010). Traveling the Shore of the Spanish Sea: the Gulf Coast of Texas and Mexico. College Station, Texas: Texas A & M University Press. ISBN 978-1603441612. OCLC 613354738.
- McDougal, Steph (2014). Lighthouses of Texas ~ Images of America. Charleston, South Carolina: Arcadia Publishing. ISBN 978-1531675660. OCLC 858731310.
- Blackburn, James B.; Galveston Bay Conservation & Preservation Assn. (2015). The Book of Texas Bays. College Station, Texas: Texas A&M University Press. ISBN 978-1603447829. OCLC 907399500.
- Lardas, Mark (2016). Texas Shipwrecks ~ Images of America. Charleston, South Carolina: Arcadia Publishing. ISBN 978-1467116176. OCLC 930257191.
- Lardas, Mark (2021). The Vanished Texas Coast: Lost Port Towns, Mysterious Shipwrecks, and Other True Tales. Charleston, South Carolina: The History Press. ISBN 978-1540248619. OCLC 1252763669.

== Periodical Publications ==
- Harrigan, Stephen (January 1979). "In Search of La Salle". Texas History. Texas Monthly.
- Tyer, Brad (September 1996). "Dig This" [A salvage operation in Matagorda Bay unearths a bureaucratic feud]. Texas History. Texas Monthly.
- Dingus, Anne (November 2002). "Lights Out". Texas History. Texas Monthly.
- Gustavus, Sarah (November 2002). "Texas History 101" [Half Moon Reef Lighthouse served as a beacon for ships coming into Matagorda Bay]. Texas History. Texas Monthly.
- Harrigan, Stephen (March 2017). "They Came From the Sky" [The first Spanish conquistadors arrive on our shores, starving, haggard, and in no mood for conquest]. Texas History. Texas Monthly.
- Berwald, Juli (September 2021). "Behind the Fight to Save the Gulf's Spectacular Coral Reefs". Texas Travel & Outdoors. Texas Monthly.

== Texas Coastal Science ==
- "Bays and Estuaries". Texas Aquatic Science. Texas Parks and Wildlife Department. July 31, 2013.
- "Coastal Conservation". Audubon Texas. National Audubon Society. January 8, 2016.
- "Gulf Coast". Education ~ Resources. Texas Parks and Wildlife Department.
- "Oceans: The Gulf of Mexico". Texas Aquatic Science. Texas Parks and Wildlife Department. July 31, 2013.
- "Red Tide in Texas". TPWD Harmful Algal Blooms Status. Texas Parks and Wildlife Department.
- "Texas Beach Watch". Texas General Land Office. U.S. Environmental Protection Agency.
- "USGS Texas Coastal Science". USGS Oklahoma-Texas Water Science Center. U.S. Department of the Interior.
- "Wetlands". Texas Aquatic Science. Texas Parks and Wildlife Department. July 31, 2013.
