= Greg J. Dixon =

American Independent Baptist pastor and activist (1932–2019)

The Reverend Gregory J. Dixon
- Born: May 2, 1932; Kansas, US
- Died: October 20, 2019 (aged 87); Indianapolis, Indiana, US
- Occupations: Pastor; televangelist; political activist
- Known for: Founding member of the Moral Majority

Ecclesiastical career
- Religion: Christianity (Independent Baptist)
- Congregations served: Indianapolis Baptist Temple

Gregory J. Dixon (1932–2019) was an American Independent Baptist pastor and activist. He was the pastor of the Indianapolis Baptist Temple from 1955 until his death in 2019. Dixon was a political activist and served as the national secretary of the Moral Majority, founded the American Coalition of Unregistered Churches, and was involved in forming the Coalition for Religious Freedom.

In 2001, Dixon was at the center of a three-month stand-off when federal agents tried to seize the Indianapolis Baptist Temple for nonpayment of back taxes amounting to $6 million.

== Background ==
Dixon was born in Kansas on May 2, 1932. His father died when he was three. At 14, he was converted at a tent revival. He enrolled at Baptist Bible College in Springfield, Missouri, in 1950. Among his classmates was Jerry Falwell, who he would remain friends with.

== Ministry ==
In 1955, Dixon became the pastor of Indianapolis Baptist Temple, which at that time had an average attendance of 150. Under the leadership of Dixon, that number grew to an attendance of 3,000 and a membership of 8,000. Through the church, Dixon developed a Christian school running from kindergarten through college. He further developed a radio and television ministry.

While expanding programs at Indianapolis Baptist Temple, Dixon instituted a bus ministry to provide bussing to Sunday school, especially targeting poor areas.

== Activism ==
Once, Dixon was asked by a reporter if he was an extremist, to which he replied, "Yes, I am 'extremely' right".

During the 1970s, Dixon became a veteran of the political battles of fundamentalism. He advocated for the Church Freedom Act in the Indiana legislature. He attacked Marion county prosecutor James Kelly for supporting gay rights. He led a group of 400 ministers to physically prevent the closing of Lester Roloff's home for children in Texas by forming a human chain around the property. He organized rallies to support Anita Bryant's Save Our Children campaign.

In 1980, seven months after founding the Moral Majority, Jerry Falwell made Dixon the national secretary and president of the Indiana division of the group. In 1982, Dixon and members of the Terre Haute Moral Majority traveled to Louisville, Nebraska, to protest the court-ordered closure of Faith Baptist school.

In 1983, Dixon resigned his posts with the Moral Majority to found the American Coalition of Unregistered Churches (ACUC). In 1984, Dixon testified on matters of religious liberty before a congressional subcommittee. He entered a letter into the record describing the unregistered church movement as being churches that only recognize Christ as authority over the church and that government has no interest in the affairs of the church. In his testimony before the committee, Dixon stated that the Internal Revenue Service (IRS) had become a terrorist organization.

In 1984, through funding from Sun Myung Moon's Unification Church, Dixon was involved with the formation of the Coalition for Religious Freedom. Dixon, along with Falwell and other fundamentalists, later pulled out of the coalition, citing concerns that the Moonies controlled the finances of the organization.

Dixon participated in the Rocky Mountain Rendezvous in Estes Park, Colorado organized by Christian Identity minister Pete Peters in 1992.

== Federal stand-off ==
In 2001, Dixon was at the center of a three-month long stand-off to prevent the seizure of Indianapolis Baptist Temple by federal authorities. The issue began in 1983 when the church dissolved its corporate status. In 1984, the church stopped withholding income tax, Social Security, and Medicare taxes from employee paychecks on the grounds that employees received "love gifts" for their service rather than wages.

When the IRS finally acted in 1993, they estimated the church owed $3.5 million for employee taxes from 1987 through 1993. By 2001, with interest and penalties, the amount had grown to $6 million. The case was eventually heard by the United States Supreme Court, which ruled against the church. The church and the parsonage were ordered to be surrendered as partial payment of the IRS debt.

Dixon refused and insisted that he would never walk out of the church under his own power. Attorney General John Ashcroft was concerned that the confrontation could flare up into another Ruby Ridge or Waco. Militia groups were interested in coming in to assist with the standoff, but Dixon refused help, stating that he did not want any violence. When US Marshals cleared the church of protestors, Dixon refused to walk out of his own power. Marshals negotiated Dixon's cooperation by having him strapped to a hospital stretcher and rolling him out of the building.

== Death ==
Dixon died on October 20, 2019.
