= Amoss =

Amoss is a surname. Notable people with the surname include:

- David Amoss, American tobacco farmer
- Jim Amoss (born 1947), American journalist, former editor of The Times-Picayune
- Thomas M. Amoss (born 1961), American thoroughbred horse trainer
- Ulius Louis Amoss (1895–1961), American intelligence officer
- William H. Amoss (1936–1997), American politician

== See also ==
- James M. Amoss Building, a historic commercial building in Wabash, Indiana, United States
