= Rocky Mountain Rendezvous (1992) =

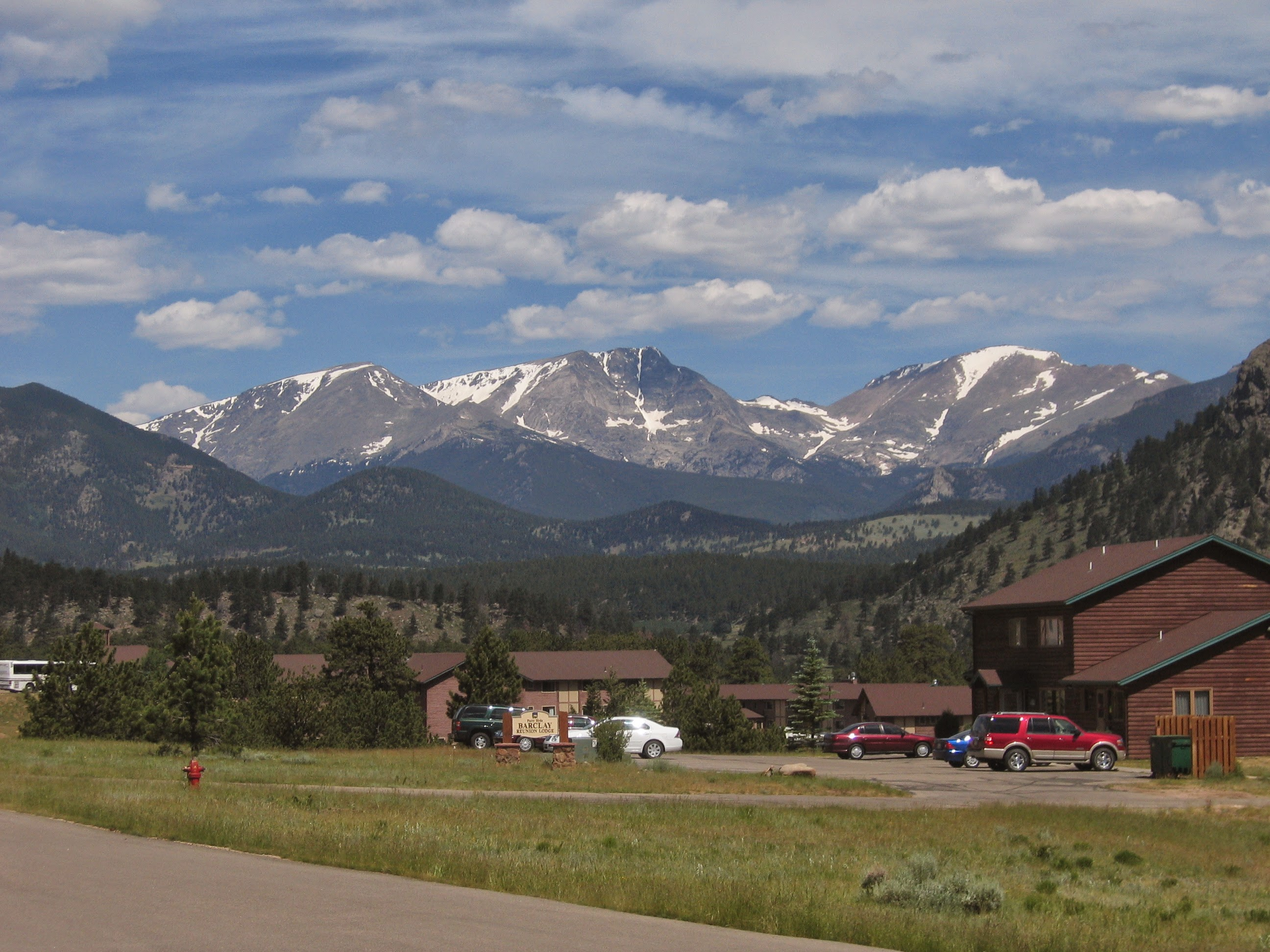
- YMCA of the Rockies, the venue of the Rendezvous
- Date: October 23–25, 1992
- Venue: Estes Park YMCA
- Location: Estes Park, Colorado
- Also known as: "Special Gathering of Christian Men"
- Theme: American militia movement, Patriot movement, Radical right politics
- Cause: Killing of Vicki and Samuel Weaver (Ruby Ridge)
- Organised by: Pete Peters, Scriptures for America Ministries
- Participants: 150–175
- Outcome: Transition of American right-wing terrorism to leaderless resistance

The Rocky Mountain Rendezvous was an October 1992 meeting in Estes Park, Colorado of 150 to 175 adherents and leaders of the American militia movement, Patriot movement and the radical right that developed the modern strategy for right-wing terrorism in the United States. The Rendezvous was organized by Christian Identity Pastor Pete Peters in response to the Ruby Ridge standoff two months prior. Concerns included that the United States federal government was a police state engaged in systematic over taxation, wrongful imprisonment and murder of its citizens, described by the meeting as "genocide."

The meeting was critical in influencing the young American militia movement and sparking the transition in radical right and white supremacist violence in the United States towards leaderless resistance.

== Attendance ==
Peters described the meeting as a gathering of "Christian men." Attendees to the rendezvous hailed from numerous, even conflicting, far-right ideologies. Groups represented included Christian Identity, the American Coalition of Unregistered Churches, sovereign citizens, tax protestors, neo-Confederates, Posse Comitatus, the neo-Nazi Aryan Nations and National Alliance, and the Ku Klux Klan. Some attendees identified themselves as "100 percent bigot."

Peters himself was a prolific anti-Semite, white supremacist, and homophobe, whose activism once sought to defeat lesbian and gay civil rights protections in nearby Fort Collins, Colorado. Other noteworthy participants included Richard G. Butler, founder of Aryan Nations, and Louis Beam, an Aryan Nations spokesman and former Ku Klux Klan Grand Dragon.

== Proceedings ==
The Rendezvous lasted for three days. The proceedings were audio-recorded and compiled into a "Special Report" by Peters.

Events included meetings in multiple subject-matter committees. Proposals ranged from circulating petitions to holding unofficial citizen grand juries. In particular, the "SWAT" ("Sacred Warfare Action Tactics") committee was responsible for hearing the essay on methods of leaderless violence presented by Beam. In Beam's explanation, "leaderless resistance" is an avenue where "a thousand different small phantom cells" could effectively overwhelm Federal forces in place of a vulnerable pyramidal hierarchy. The essay was reproduced in whole in the meeting report.

The attendees of the Rocky Mountain Rendezvous also drafted and sent an open letter to the family of Vicki and Samuel Weaver, the civilian casualties of Ruby Ridge, that acknowledged their "mortal sacrifices."

=== Religious underpinnings ===
The Rendezvous placed a special emphasis on Christian theology. In multiple references to the Bible, the SWAT committee identified that perpetrators of lone wolf attacks are actors under the command of Jesus Christ. The introduction to the Special Report by Peters quoted Book of Numbers 35:33:

So you shall not pollute the land where you are; for blood defiles the land, and no atonement can be made for the land, for the blood that is shed on it, except by the blood of him who shed it.

Attendees feared that actors of the Antichrist would force open, violent conflict and identified the need for a Christian resistance and the creation of a "Christian civil body politic." Militant violence was further justified as a necessary path to resist the conspiracy theories of a Zionist Occupation Government (ZOG) or New World Order.

Paradoxically, some attendees criticized the meeting's support for Randy Weaver, widower and father of Vicki and Samuel Weaver, for having "a poor reputation as a Christian man." This criticism was disregarded as irrelevant.

== Legacy ==
The Rocky Mountain Rendezvous was a "watershed" in right-wing extremism. The Rendezvous placed leaderless resistance at the forefront of right-wing extremist strategy and provided a blueprint for future violent action—in part a brainchild of Beam. Leaderless resistance shifted violence away from the "robes of the KKK and the uniforms of the Aryan Nations." Thus, lone wolves and small, secret cells are relied on.

Four months after the meeting, the 1993 Waco siege at the Mount Carmel Center of the Branch Davidians fueled significant animosity against the United States federal government, and gave sympathy to the American militia movement espoused at the Rendezvous. The promotion of antigovernmental extremism and small-cell violence by the Rendezvous has been credited in the 1995 Oklahoma City bombing committed by Timothy McVeigh less than three years after.

Since 2001 and the advent of the internet age, informal online communities and mass media have become the loci of radicalization for leaderless actors once fostered in extremist groups.
