= Pete Peters =

Christian Identity minister

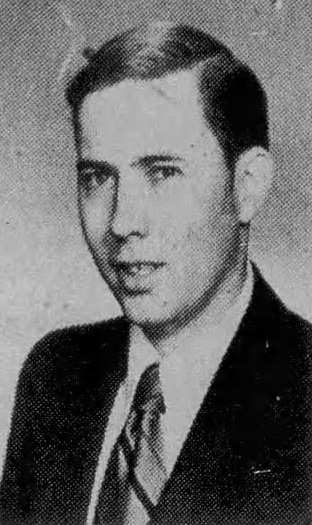
Peters in 1976

Peter J. Peters (November 13, 1946 – July 7, 2011) was a Christian Identity minister who led LaPorte Church of Christ as an independent church in Laporte, Colorado, from 1977 until his death in 2011. He maintained a radio, television, and newsletter ministry known as Scriptures for America.

An on-air argument during an interview of Peters by Denver talk radio host Alan Berg was considered to be a motive for the murder of Berg by members of The Order.

== Early ministry ==
Pete Peters was born in 1946 in Ogallala, Nebraska. He attended Colorado State University where he received a Bachelor of Science degree in agri-business and economics; he also received a degree from the University of Nebraska School of Agriculture. During college, Peters opposed the antiwar movement and joined the John Birch Society and Young Americans for Freedom.

After receiving a bachelor's degree in Sacred Literature of the Bible from the Church of Christ Bible Training School in Gering, Nebraska, Peters began preaching as a minister for the Church of Christ. In 1977, he went to the LaPorte Church of Christ. The church was unable to support him full time, so he also worked for the US Department of Agriculture. This was during the farm crisis of the 1980s and Peters witnessed many farmers who lost everything. Peters began listening to radio sermons by Identity minister Sheldon Emry. He initially rejected the Identity message preached by Emry as British Israelism or Armstrongism, but he eventually accepted it and converted to Christian Identity. This caused Peters to lose all but five of the original congregants of LaPorte Church of Christ.

== Alan Berg interview ==
Early on, Peters had an association with the Christian Patriots Defense League through Sheldon Emry and Jack Mohr. In January, 1984, Peters hosted Mohr at LaPorte Church of Christ which resulted in protests from the interfaith council in nearby Fort Collins, Colorado. This caught the attention of Denver talk radio host Alan Berg, who hosted Peters and Mohr on his show February 13, 1984. Berg's interview was intended to humiliate Peters and Mohr.

Berg hosted both Peters in Colorado and Mohr in Mississippi via telephone hookup. In the on-air argument that ensued, Berg stated "Both of you are cowards. Bail out right now", after which Mohr hung up on Berg.

The interview was heard by several members of The Order, as Robert Mathews and David Lane had met in Peters congregation. On June 18, 1984, members of The Order assassinated Berg in his driveway. The on-air argument between Berg and Peters was noted at trial as a motive for the killing.

After this, Peters began to shun the media and refused to speak to members of the press.

== Christian Identity ministry ==
Emry ordained Peters as a Christian Identity minister in October 1984.

Peters began distributing tapes of his sermons in 1984, followed by a monthly newsletter. Eventually, he was broadcasting on two shortwave frequencies, nine radio stations, and a television program, all under the umbrella of Scriptures for America, which was considered to be one of the country's largest and most active outreach programs. Peters worked closely with his wife, Cheri, who wrote a column for the monthly newsletter, often addressing issues of family, motherhood, and schooling. Peters used annual Bible camps to hold his congregation together and evangelize others. Camps featured talent nights, Saxon games, quilting, campfire singing, and other activities. These camps also served as a training ground for Identitarians, with Peters bringing in speakers and teachers for various topics. Speakers included Bo Gritz.

1988 was the beginning of early efforts by Peters at mainstreaming Christian Identity when he published Remnant Resolves, a refutation of a reconfiguration of the Identity movement following the Fort Smith sedition trial. Christian Identity leader like Dan Gayman began distancing themselves from members of the movement that advocated violence. Peters used a sense of nostalgia for history in Remnant Resolves to advocate for a political and hermeneutic sensibility called Christian Constitutionalism. The first half of the pamphlet outlines the building blocks for establishing Christ's lordship over the nation. The second have formulates a plan for mass distribution and getting these building blocks read into the Congressional record with the intent to put federal authorities on notice.

While Peters early on had dismissed Christian reconstructionism as being "saturated by Jews", he eventually moved more in a direction of reconstruction, quoting reconstructionists like R. J. Rushdoony, Gary DeMar, and David Barton.

In an event that caught the attention of the Christian Identity world, the Ruby Ridge standoff in 1992 played out while Peters was holding his annual Scriptures for America Bible Camp, August 22–28, 1992. Following the standoff, Peters laid the groundwork for the modern militia movement at a meeting held in Estes Park, Colorado. This was an opportunity for Peters to insert influence in the Identity community and step into the vacuum of leadership as Richard Butler's influence was waning in the wake of the Fort Smith trial. The Estes Park meeting was held from October 23–25, 1992 as a closed-door meeting with around 160 of the most prominent right-wing extremist leaders. Peters intended the Estes Park meeting to be a summit deciding how to respond to the Ruby Ridge incident and the killings of Vicki and Sammy Weaver. The meeting attracted prominent figures in Christian Identity and the militia movement, including Richard Butler and Larry Pratt. Louis Beam attended and his 1980s essay, Leaderless Resistance, was revived and distributed at the meeting, encouraging autonomous cells organized around ideology. Ultimately, Peters's attempt to unite the varying factions of Identity was unsuccessful.

In 1997, Peters was a featured speaker at the Fourth Annual Super Conference of Christian Israel Churches, hosted by Everett Ramsey in Branson, Missouri.

Peters died July 7, 2011.
