= Leaderless resistance =

Social resistance strategy

Leaderless resistance, or phantom cell structure, is a social resistance strategy in which small, independent groups (covert cells), or individuals (a solo cell is called a "lone wolf"), challenge an established institution such as a law, economic system, social order, or government. Leaderless resistance can encompass anything from non-violent protest and civil disobedience to vandalism, terrorism, and other violent activity.

Leaderless cells lack vertical command links and so operate without hierarchical command, but they have a common goal that links them to the social movement from which their ideology was learned.

Leaderless resistance has been employed by animal rights, radical environmentalist, anti-abortion, insurgent, anarchist, anti-colonial, white supremacist, and terrorist groups.

== General characteristics ==
A covert cell may be a lone individual or a small group. The basic characteristic of the structure is that there is no explicit communication between cells that are acting toward shared goals. Members of one cell usually have little or no information about who else is agitating on behalf of their cause. Scholar Paul Joosse argues that leaderless resistance movements can avoid the ideological disputes and infighting that plague radical groups.

Leaderless movements may have a symbolic figurehead. This can be a public figure, a multiple-use name, or an inspirational author, who picks generic targets and objectives, but does not actually manage or execute plans. Media, in this case, often create a positive feedback loop: by publishing declarations of a movement's role model, this instills motivation, ideas, and assumed sympathy in the minds of potential agitators who in turn lend further authority to the figurehead. While this may loosely resemble a vertical command structure, it is notably unidirectional: a titular leader makes pronouncements, and activists may respond, but there is no formal contact between the two levels of organization.

As a result, leaderless resistance cells are resistant to informants and traitors. As there is neither a center that may be destroyed, nor links between the cells that may be infiltrated, it is more difficult for established authorities to arrest the development of a leaderless resistance movement than it is with movements that adopt more conventional hierarchies.

Leaderless resistance often involves resistance by violent means, but it is not limited to them. Non-violent groups can use the same structure to author, print, and distribute samizdat literature, to create self-propagating boycotts against political opponents via the internet, to maintain an alternative electronic currency outside of the reach of taxing governments and transaction-logging banks, and so forth.

== History ==
The concept of leaderless resistance was developed by Col. Ulius Louis Amoss, a former U.S. intelligence officer, in the early 1950s. An anti-communist, Amoss saw leaderless resistance as a way to prevent the penetration and destruction of CIA-supported resistance cells in Eastern European countries under Soviet control.

The concept was revived and popularized in an essay published by the anti-government Ku Klux Klan member Louis Beam in 1983, again in 1992, and was read as a keynote message at the 1992 gathering Rocky Mountain Rendezvous of right-wing activists. Beam advocated leaderless resistance as a technique for white nationalists to continue the struggle against the U.S. government, despite an overwhelming imbalance in power and resources.

Beam argued that conventional hierarchical pyramidal organizations are extremely dangerous for their participants, when employed in a resistance movement against government, because of the ease of disclosing the chain of command. A less dangerous approach would be to convince like-minded individuals to form independent cells without close communication between each other but generally operating in the same direction.

== In practice ==
=== Far-right ===
The concept of leaderless resistance remains important to far-right thinking in the United States, as a proposed response to perceived federal government over-reach at the expense of individual rights. Simson Garfinkel, however, found in his research that for the most part the far right seldom used this tactic. Timothy McVeigh is one example in the United States. McVeigh worked in a small cell which based its attack on motivations widespread among far-right anti-government groups and the militia movement. Louis Beam discussed leaderless resistance in an influential essay of the same name.

Leaderless resistance has been advocated by white supremacist groups such as White Aryan Resistance (WAR) and the British neo-Nazi Combat 18 (C18). The modern Ku Klux Klan is also credited with having developed a leaderless resistance model. Troy Southgate also advocated forms of leaderless resistance during his time as a leading activist in the National Revolutionary Faction and a pioneer of National-Anarchism. James Mason a former American Nazi Party member and neo-Nazi was a proponent of the idea of "leaderless resistance" as detailed in SIEGE a collection of writings from the defunct National Socialist Liberation Front (NSLF) which advocated violence against political opponents, Jews and non-whites of which he deemed to be the supposedly Jewish controlled entity he referred to as "The System" which has since been embraced by the Atomwaffen Division (AWD) in the modern day.

Stormfront, Aryan Nations, and Hammerskin Nation (HSN) link to Beam's Leaderless Resistance. These groups promote lone wolf actions. While nominally decrying violence, the sites praise the man who "practices what he preaches, and who backs up his words with his deeds." Stormfront, while regretting the loss of life, explains how Benjamin Nathaniel Smith's 1999 killing spree was compelled by circumstances. The World Church of the Creator (WCOTC) gave a mixed message, calling Smith "a selfless man who gave his life in the resistance to Jewish/mud tyranny," but noting "the Church does not condone his acts." Anti-abortion militants The Army of God use leaderless resistance as their organizing principle.

=== Radical environmentalism ===
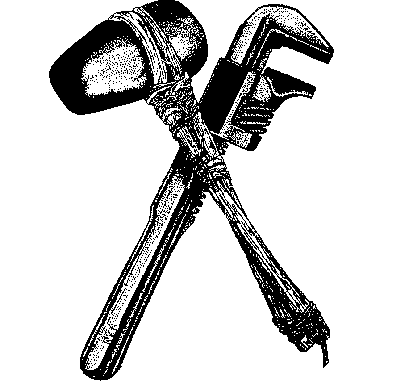
The symbol of Earth First!: a Monkey wrench and stone hammer.

The radical environmentalist group Earth First! also adopted the leaderless resistance model, as did the Earth Liberation Front.

== See also ==
- Anti-pedophile activism
- Asymmetric warfare
- Clandestine cell system
- Individualist anarchism
- Insurrectionary anarchism
- James C. Scott
- Social peer-to-peer processes
- The Starfish and the Spider
- Shaheen Bagh Protests
