= Vietnamese Fishermen's Association v. Knights of the Ku Klux Klan =

1981 American court case

Vietnamese Fishermen's Association v. Knights of the Ku Klux Klan was a successful lawsuit brought by Vietnamese Americans in 1981 against a faction of the Ku Klux Klan.

== Background ==
After the Vietnam War, conflict arose on the Texas Gulf Coast between white fishermen and newly arrived Vietnamese shrimpers. On February 14, 1981, the Ku Klux Klan hosted a fish fry on a private farm in Santa Fe, to protest the growing presence of Vietnamese shrimpers. During the event, a Vietnamese fishing boat was ceremonially burned. There were similar conflicts in nearby port towns like Rockport, and an offshore "boat ride" by Klan members on March 15 the same year, which frightened families of Vietnamese fishermen.

== Legal action ==
On April 16, 1981, Morris Dees of the Southern Poverty Law Center filed a lawsuit against the Klan on behalf a group of Vietnamese American fishermen. The trial of Vietnamese Fishermen's Association v. Knights of the Ku Klux Klan began on May 10 before Judge Gabrielle Kirk McDonald in the United States District Court for the Southern District of Texas, Houston Division; on May 14, the judge issued a preliminary injunction forbidding the defendants from harassing the Vietnamese fishermen or inciting harassment of them, and in a July written opinion, entirely upheld the lawsuit on the basis of Texas law and the Sherman Antitrust Act. In June 1982, McDonald granted the VFA and the SPLC's request for injunction against the Texas Emergency Reserve, a militia with ties to the Klan, on the grounds that the organization violated Texas law prohibiting private militias. McDonald rejected the KKK's First and Second Amendment defenses, writing that "The First Amendment is no defense to a charge of conspiracy even if the act was committed for political or ideological reasons"; and that the "Second Amendment does not imply any constitutional right for individuals to bear arms and form private armies.

== See also ==
- Alamo Bay, 1985 film about the conflict
