= E. Raymond Capt =

Archaeologist, pyramidologist, and Anglo-Israel advocate

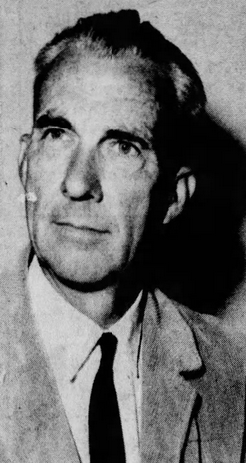
- Capt in 1970
- Born: August 14, 1914
- Died: March 11, 2008 (aged 93)
- Relatives: San Jacinto Capt (father)

E. Raymond Capt (August 14, 1914 – March 11, 2008) was an archaeologist and pyramidologist. Capt was an Anglo-Israel advocate and a promoter of Christian Identity in the 1960s and 1970s. His father was San Jacinto Capt.

== Background ==
Capt received a M.A. in Christian History and Biblical Archaeology from Covenant College in Lake Wales, Florida. He was a member of the Archaeological Institute of America.

Capt was an instructor at the American Institute of Theology. He was on the lecturing staff of the Institute of Pyramidology of Great Britain.

In 1997, Capt was a featured speaker at the Fourth Annual Super Conference of Christian Israel Churches, hosted by Everett Ramsey in Branson, Missouri.

== Anglo-Israelism ==
Using the Gimira Tablets from ancient Nineveh, Capt supported his Anglo-Israelism.

Capt taught that Jesus visited Britain in his youth, along with his great uncle, Joseph of Arimathea, who was a tin merchant with a fleet traveling between Rome and England. He credits Joseph of Arimathea with later bringing Christianity to England.

Capt was a strong influence on Christian Identity pastor Wesley Swift, as was his father, San Jacinto Capt.

== Political views ==
In a February 8, 1992 letter to the editor of the Camarillo Star, Capt wrote that, "All our laws, until recently, were based on Biblical law. Today, our legislators are legislating immorality and many Christians are unwilttingly endorsing them with their silence. It is time to speak up."

== Selected works ==
- The Great Pyramid Decoded, 1971
- The Glory of the Stars, 1976
- Jacob's Pillar, 1977
- Stonehenge and Druidism, 1979
- The Lost Chapter of Acts of the Apostles, 1982
- Missing Links Discovered in Assyrian Tablets, 1985
- Study in Pyramidology, 1986
- The Gem Stones in the Breastplate, 1987
- The Traditions of Glastonbury, 1987
- The Resurrection Tomb, 1988
