= Unregistered Baptist Fellowship =

Affiliation of churches opposed to 501(c)(3) registration

The Unregistered Baptist Fellowship (UBF) is an organization of churches opposed to registering as 501(c)(3) corporations for IRS tax exempt status. It was organized under this name in 1994, having formed out of the American Coalition of Unregistered Churches (ACUC) organization, founded by Greg J. Dixon, in 1984.

The movement was organized and run by Greg J. Dixon, who was the former pastor of Indianapolis Baptist Temple, a church that was the center of a 92-day standoff with federal agents over unpaid taxes. Dixon defined an unregistered church as one that recognizes only Christ as the head of the church, based on Matthew 28:18-20 and Ephesians 1:22-23. He further noted that it is unincorporated because it does not operate for profit, nor seek any accreditation by state authority and that government has no interest in the internal affairs of the church.

The UBF considers 501(c)(3) status an acknowledgement of government authority over the church, and thus they reject registering to make donations tax deductible. The UBF holds that governmental authority stops "at the threshold of the church", and that accepting 501(c)(3) status is "caving in to secular demands that interfere with religion."

At one point, UBF held an annual meeting in October. These originally occurred at Indianapolis Baptist Temple, but following the IBT standoff, these began occurring at other churches. It is unclear if they continue to have an annual meeting following the death of Greg Dixon.

UBF does not current maintain a list of "member" churches on their web site. However, a resolution from their 2015 annual meeting supported Kent Hovind in his trial for tax evasion.
