= San Jacinto Capt =

Influential figure in the formation of Christian Identity

San Jacinto Capt (April 21, 1889 – September 23, 1964) was an influential figure in the formation of the Christian Identity, a white supremacist interpretation of Christianity. He was a former Klansman, pyramidologist, and an advocate of Anglo-Israelism.

He was born in Devine, Texas. As of 1918, he was married and had one child. Capt was the father of archaeologist E. Raymond Capt, who was also involved in Identity groups. He was listed as a Fresno-area member of the Ku Klux Klan in 1922, after Fresno Klan headquarters in the area were raided and their names were found. He co-owned the Center State printing company with another member of the KKK in 1923.

Capt is responsible for converting William Potter Gale to Christian Identity and facilitated his initial training. According to Gale's interviews with journalist Cheri Seymour, Capt began meeting with him in his home in 1953. Gale and Capt began teaching groups together, Gale would teach the Constitution and the Bible, while Capt would teach pyramidology and Egyptology. Capt was the membership and precinct chairman of the Constitution Party, which ran Gale as a write-in candidate for governor of California. Capt headed Gale's campaign.

Capt is also credited with introducing William Potter Gale to Wesley Swift, two of the most notable figures in the formation of Christian Identity from British Israelism. Capt had formed a pyramid study group in Temple City, California. Capt's role in the Southern California emergence of Christian Identity was to provide Swift with an audience that was receptive to the message. (Note: Much of the early history of Christian Identity's emergence in Southern California is clouded by second-hand accounts from Identity figures such as William Potter Gale. Early on, Gale was very close to Wesley Swift, but they became bitter enemies in later years. Thus, recollections from Gale must be considered with care. Gale wrote his history after Swift's death, leaving no one to counter his version, and much of his story was publicized later through extended interviews with reporter Cheri Seymour.)

It is likely that Capt was responsible for the initial idea of the Christian Defense League. According to Gale's recollections, it was Capt who conceived of the idea for the CDL. This, according to Gale, occurred sometime between 1957 and 1962.

Capt, along with Wesley Swift, is credited with bringing the two seedline theology into Christian Identity by Jeffrey Weakly in his book The Satanic Seedline, Its Doctrine and History.

== Sources ==
- Barkun, Michael (1997). Religion and the Racist Right: The Origins of the Christian Identity Movement. UNC Press Books. ISBN 978-0-8078-4638-4.
- Kaplan, Jeffrey (2000). Encyclopedia of White Power: A Sourcebook on the Radical Racist Right. Rowman & Littlefield. ISBN 978-0-7425-0340-3.
- Levitas, Daniel (2004). The Terrorist Next Door: The Militia Movement and the Radical Right. Macmillan. ISBN 978-1-4299-4180-8.
- Seymour, Cheri (1991). Committee of the States: Inside the Radical Right. Camden Place Communications. ISBN 0-9628772-0-4.
