= Ulius Louis Amoss =

American intelligence officer (1895–1961)

- Born: 1895
- Died: 1961 (aged 65–66)
- Military career
- Allegiance: United States
- Branch: United States Army; Office of Strategic Services (OSS); Central Intelligence Agency (CIA)
- Service years: 1942-1961
- Rank: Colonel
- Commands: U.S. 9th Air Force; Office of Strategic Services
- Conflicts: World War II; Cold War operations

Col. Ulius Louis Amoss (1895–1961) was a US intelligence officer who wrote the original essay on Leaderless Resistance in the 1950s after he retired and was upset with what he wrote was bad operational practices of the Central Intelligence Agency.

== Career ==
=== International Services of Information Foundation, Inc. ===
Amoss operated a private intelligence organization called International Services of Information (ISI) Foundation, Inc. On October 30, 1962, its official periodical INFORM described ISI as "a private, non-profit foundation that has been providing independent intelligence from other lands for over sixteen years." INFORM was edited by Ulius Amoss from its inception in 1955 to October 1961, whereupon Mary Veronica Amoss stepped into the role the following month.

=== Leaderless Resistance ===
According to Amoss, resistance cells with members who made contact with U.S. intelligence agents or émigré ethnic anticommunist organizations were being penetrated by Soviet and Soviet Bloc intelligence agencies, broken up, the members tortured, and sometimes executed. Therefore, Amoss urged U.S. intelligence policy be shifted from an old-fashioned hierarchical model such as that used in World War II with resistance organizations, and refocused on encouraging Leaderless Resistance to destabilize and subvert Soviet occupation of Eastern European countries such as Poland, the example he cites in detail in his essay. Amoss warned that traditional hierarchical underground cells organized by the CIA in Eastern Europe were being penetrated and liquidated by Soviet and Eastern Bloc counterintelligence operations.

Amoss: "we do not need 'leaders'; we need leading ideas. These ideas would produce leaders. The masses would produce them and the ideas would be their inspiration. Therefore, we must create these ideas and convey them to the restless peoples concerned with them."

In 1961 leaflets were airdropped over Cuba by anti-Castro Cuban exiles and their allies with close ties to the Central Intelligence Agency. The leaflets used the concept of Leaderless Resistance and called for the creation of "Phantom Cells" (Celulas Fantasmas).

There was no apparent connection between Amoss and the leaflets, according to Michael Paulding, who is writing a book on an early OSS figure and has studied Amoss and his work. Amoss died in November 1961, a few months after the failed CIA-orchestrated Bay of Pigs invasion of Cuba. Amoss's Leaderless Resistance essay is republished posthumously in 1962 in the INFORM newsletter, having been rewritten from the 1953 original by a freelancer, according to Paulding.

== Personal life ==
Amoss married Mary Veronica Amoss.

== Works ==
- Leaderless Resistance: New Tactics for an Old War. OCLC 228300668.
  - Originally published in Inform, no. 6205 (Apr. 17, 1962).
