= Texas Emergency Reserve =

The Texas Emergency Reserve (TER) was a militia group which operated in Texas, and at its peak had close to 2,500 members. In 1981, a U.S. District Court judge ordered the TER to close its military training camp based on a Texas law that forbade private armies in the state.

The Reserve had ties with the Ku Klux Klan, and with one of the Klan's prominent members, Louis Beam. The Reserve is most famous for an incident which took place in Seabrook, Texas on March 15, 1981, in which armed members of the organization held a demonstration on a boat in the waters around the city in an attempt to intimidate local Vietnamese fishermen who had been settled there by the government.

In the course of the demonstration, an effigy of a Vietnamese fisherman was hung from the stern of the ship and threatening gestures were made to the onlooking Vietnamese fishermen and their families.
