= Gordon Mohr =

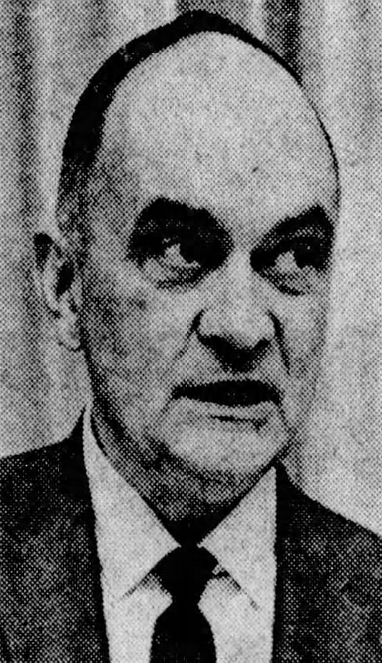
- Born: Gordon Dwight Mohr; January 1, 1916; Chicago, Illinois, U.S.
- Died: July 17, 2003 (aged 87); North Little Rock, Arkansas, U.S.
- Other name: Jack Mohr
- Organization(s): Christian Patriots Defense League, Citizens Emergency Defense System
- Title: Lieutenant Colonel
- Movement: Christian Identity, Sovereign citizen movement, American militia movement

Gordon Dwight "Jack" Mohr (January 1, 1916 – July 17, 2003) was an American Christian Identity author and preacher who is considered to be an influential figure in the Christian Patriot movement.

== Early life and military service ==
Mohr was born in Chicago on January 1, 1916. He enlisted in the United States Army during the early days of World War II and served in such along with the Korean War before retiring in 1964 with the rank of Lieutenant colonel.

== Far-right militia movement ==
Mohr was the leader of the Citizens Emergency Defense System, a White Christian paramilitary unit which was considered to be the armed wing of the Christian Patriots Defense League – an Illinois-based antisemitic survivalist organization.

== Views and writings ==
Mohr was a promoter of Christian Identity religion and The Protocols of the Elders of Zion, an alleged forgery of an antisemitic text purporting to describe a Jewish plan for global domination. Mohr wrote for many publications, including his own Christian Patriot Crusader. One 1986 article has been linked by political opponents to a Seattle man who, after failing to arrange a meeting with Mohr, went on to murder a family of four.

In 1997, Mohr was a featured speaker at the Fourth Annual Super Conference of Christian Israel Churches, hosted by Everett Ramsey in Branson, Missouri.
