= Indianapolis Baptist Temple =

Church in Indiana, United States

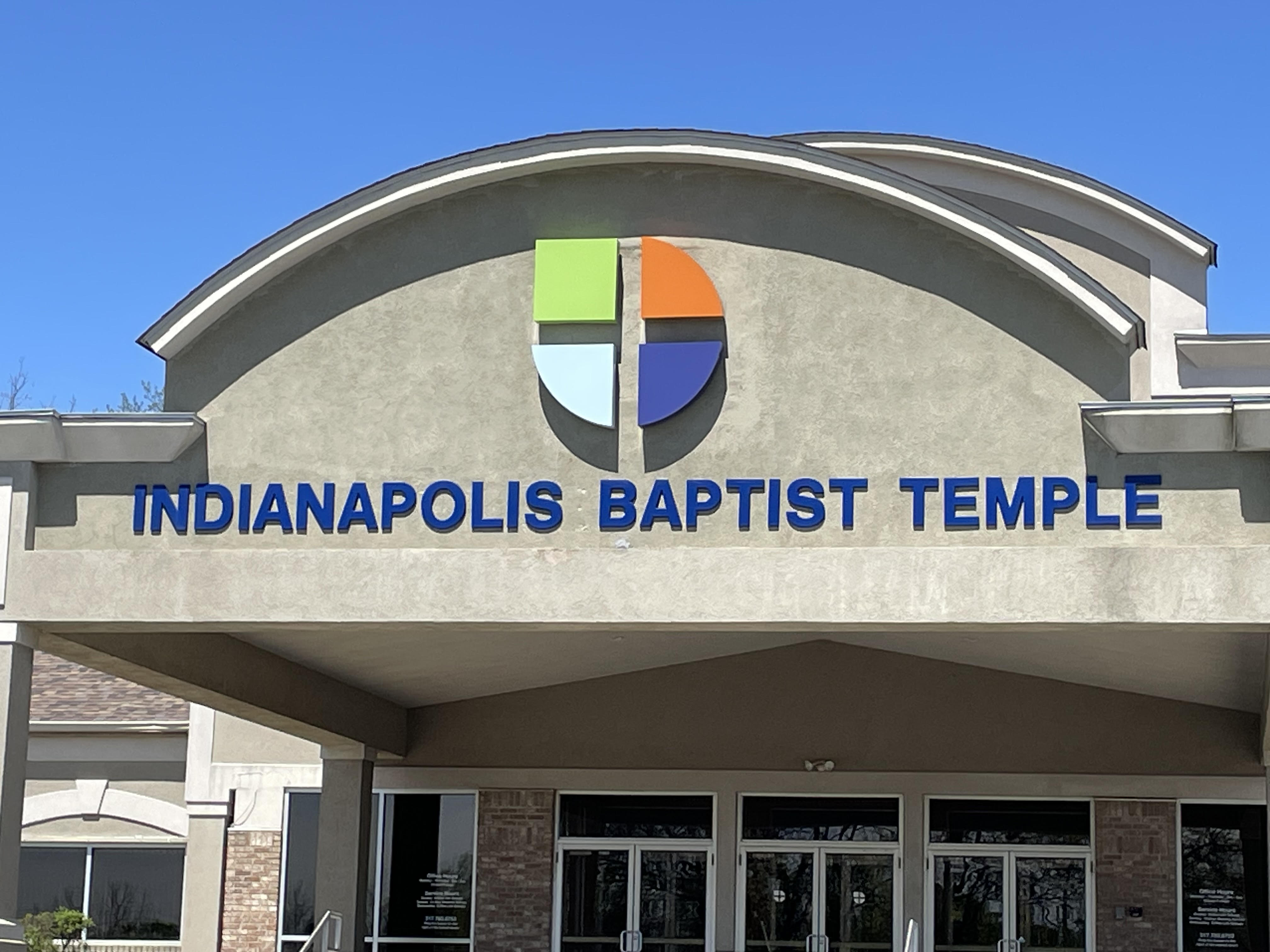
- Entrance of Indianapolis Baptist Temple

- Location within Indiana Location within the United States
- 39°39′58.8″N 86°5′56.3″W
- Location: 4002 E. Southport Rd. Indianapolis, Indiana
- Country: United States
- Website: www.ibtlife.com

The Indianapolis Baptist Temple (IBT) is an Independent Baptist church based in Indianapolis, Indiana, United States. The church's building was seized by the U.S. federal government in 2001 after the church refused to withhold taxes from employees' paychecks for 16 years. The longtime pastor of the church during this period, Greg J. Dixon, died in October 2019, aged 87.

== History ==
Indianapolis Baptist Temple was founded in March 1950. The church became a member of the Bible Baptist Fellowship.

In 1955, Greg J. Dixon became pastor. When he started at the church, it had average attendance of 150. During the next 20 years, IBT grew by about 300 members a year, according to the Polis Research Center at IUPUI. The congregation was at its peak during the 1970s, when it had as many as 8,000 members and an average attendance of 3,000. The 1977 BBC documentary series The Long Search used the IBT and Dixon to represent Christian fundamentalism in the program entitled Protestant Spirit USA.
