= Louis Beam =

American white supremacist (born 1946)

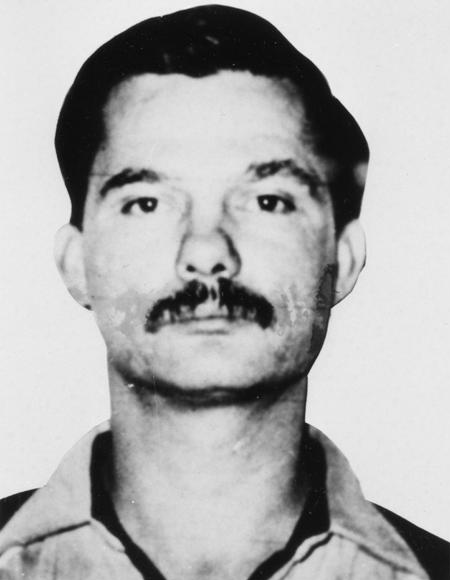
- FBI ten most wanted poster as fugitive #414
- Born: Louis Ray Beam Jr. 20 August 1946 (age 80); Lufkin, Texas
- Occupation: Political activist
- Known for: The first important proponent of leaderless resistance within the white supremacist movement
- Movement: White supremacism

Louis Ray Beam Jr. (born August 20, 1946) is an American white supremacist.

After high school, he joined the United States Army and served as a helicopter door-gunner in Vietnam. He was awarded the Distinguished Flying Cross. Once he returned to the United States, he became a Klansman, leading a maritime Louisiana KKK element and Klan rally in Texas against government help to Vietnamese immigrant fishermen. He was also the leader of the Texas Emergency Reserve, a militia that was disbanded by the courts in 1982 as a result of a lawsuit filed under Texas anti-militia law by the Southern Poverty Law Center (SPLC). The lawsuit was brought by SPLC after the militia harassed Vietnamese fishermen during the 1981 fishing season.

Beam was using Camp Puller near Houston in 1980 to train militia, including children as young as eight years old, in armed guerrilla tactics; the camp was shut down after publicity led to protests, and parents complaining that they were not aware of the children's activities at the camp. The Boy Scouts Council of Houston rejected a charter request from the troop at Camp Puller. Videotape shown during the shrimper hearing had Beam saying, "We're going to assume authority in this country." He moved to Idaho afterwards and became active with Aryan Nations in the early 1980s. Beam became a Christian Identity minister and Aryan Nations ambassador-at-large.

He was arrested November 6, 1987, at home with his wife in Guadalajara, Mexico. During the arrest, Beam's wife opened fire and critically injured a Mexican police officer. He was wanted as a fugitive #414 of the FBI ten most wanted list on charges of seditious conspiracy to violently overthrow the U.S. government.

In 1988, he was later acquitted in a separate case of conspiring to overthrow the government. He is considered to be the first important proponent of the strategy of leaderless resistance within the white supremacist movement. Beam's ideology has been compared to later developments in the white supremacist movement, with online calls for lone wolf terrorism and violence against the government.

== See also ==
- Vietnamese Fisherman's Association v. Knights of the Ku Klux Klan
