= Assassination of Huey Long =

1935 murder in Baton Rouge, Louisiana, US

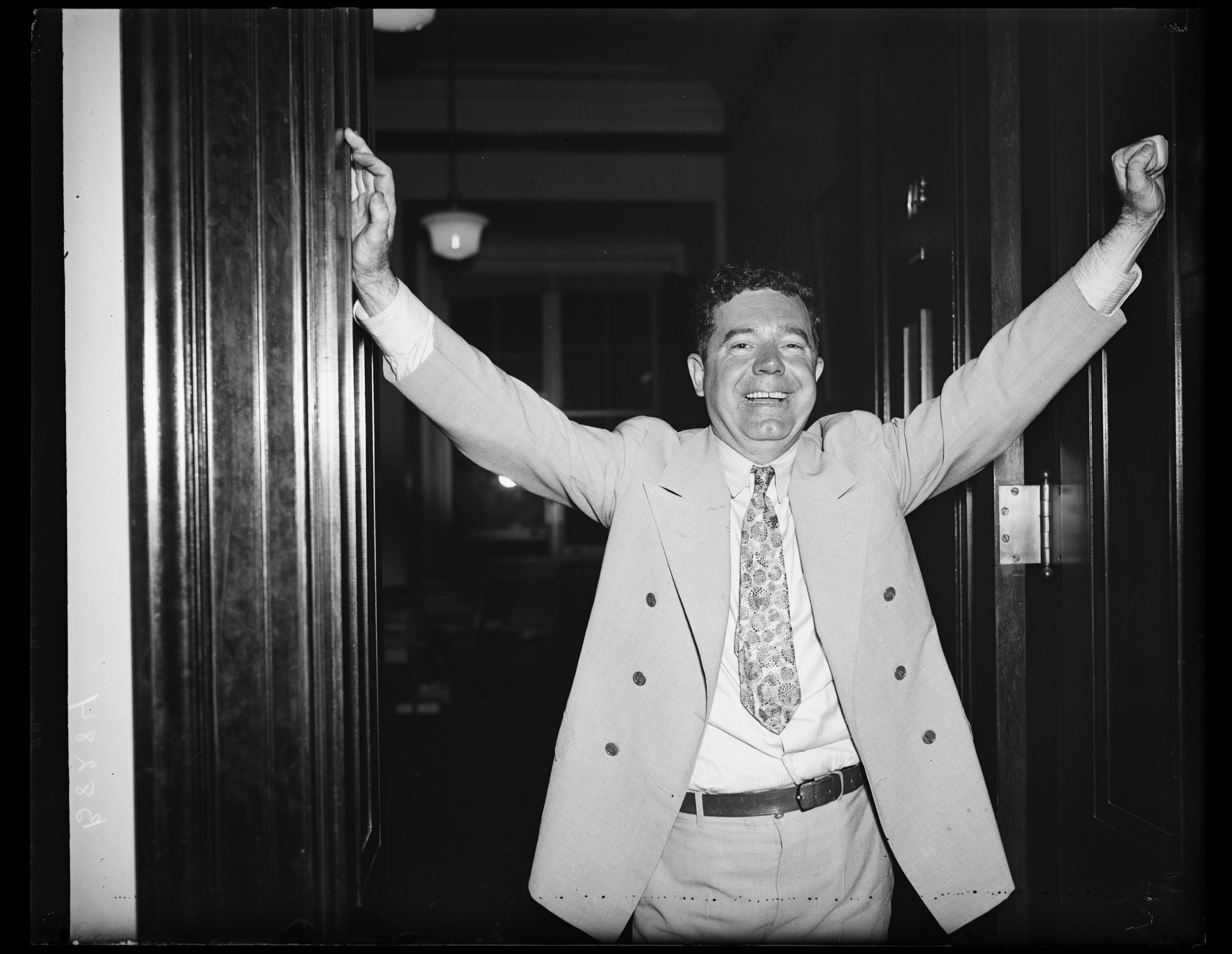
- Long about two weeks before his death
- Location: 30°27′26″N 91°11′15″W; Louisiana State Capitol, Baton Rouge, Louisiana, U.S.
- Date: September 8, 1935; 91 years ago 9:20 p.m. (Central Daylight Time)
- Target: Huey Pierce Long Jr.
- Attack type: Assassination by shooting
- Weapon: FN Model 1910
- Deaths: 2 (including the perpetrator)
- Perpetrator: Carl Austin Weiss Sr.
- Motive: Unclear

On September 8, 1935, Huey Long, a United States senator and former Louisiana governor, was fatally shot at the Louisiana State Capitol in Baton Rouge, Louisiana. Long was an extremely popular and influential politician at the time, and his death eliminated a possible 1936 presidential bid against Democrat Franklin D. Roosevelt.

Long was at the capitol to pass a redistricting bill to oust Judge Benjamin Henry Pavy, an opposition state judge. Shortly after passing the bill, Long was ambushed in a hallway by Carl Weiss, Pavy's son-in-law. According to the most widely accepted version of events, Weiss shot Long in the chest, and Long's bodyguards shot Weiss, killing him instantly. There remains some controversy over whether Weiss actually shot Long, with an alternative theory claiming he was shot by his bodyguard(s) by accident during the fight and another was that Weiss instead punched Long, who was then killed in the crossfire when his bodyguards opened fire on Weiss. Long was rushed to the Our Lady of the Lake Regional Medical Center, where emergency surgery failed to stop internal bleeding. He was pronounced dead at 4:10 a.m. on September 10, 31 hours after being shot.

Over 200,000 people attended Long's funeral. His remains were buried on the grounds of the Louisiana State Capitol, which he had constructed. A statue of Long by Charles Keck was erected on his grave in 1940. Without Long as its leader, his Share Our Wealth movement collapsed, clearing the way for Roosevelt to be re-elected to the White House in a landslide. Long and Robert F. Kennedy of New York (in 1968) are the only two sitting United States senators to be assassinated, both while running for president.

== Background ==
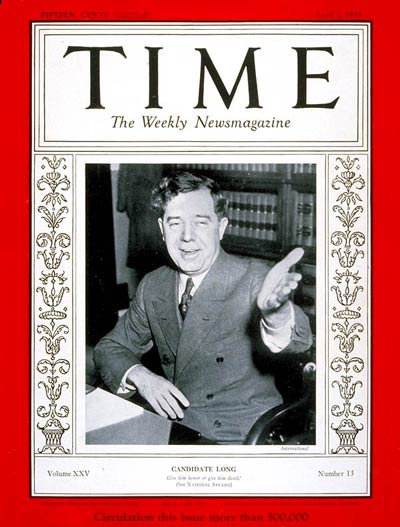
Long on the cover of Time in 1935

Huey Long rose to national stature in the early 1930s for his criticism of U.S. President Franklin D. Roosevelt and his New Deal. Long instead proposed the Share Our Wealth program, which called for massive federal spending, a wealth tax, and wealth redistribution. Failing to pass legislation in the Senate, Long formed a national political organization, the Share Our Wealth Society. The network of local clubs operated outside of and in opposition to the Democratic Party and Roosevelt. By 1935, the society had over 7.5 million members in 27,000 clubs across the country. Long's Senate office received an average of 60,000 letters a week, resulting in Long hiring 48 stenographers to type responses. Long's newspaper American Progress averaged a circulation of 300,000, with some issues reaching 1.5 million.

Long had previously acknowledged the possibility of his own death. Some even claimed that he had a morbid fascination with it. In a 1935 speech, he claimed that his political enemies had a plot to kill him with "one man, one gun, one bullet." Long had even sensationally claimed that Chicago gangsters were after him. His own right-hand-man, Gerald L. K. Smith, declared in 1935 that "the only way they will keep Huey Long from the White House is to kill him." In spring 1935, one of Long's opponents in Louisiana warned, "I am not gifted with second sight. ... But I can see blood on the polished floor of this Capitol. For if you ride this thing through, you will travel with the white horse of death."

== Assassination ==
On Sunday, September 8, 1935, Long left his twelfth floor suite at the Roosevelt Hotel in New Orleans. While leaving, the hotel's owner Seymour Weiss (Note: Of no relation to Carl Weiss.) asked Long where the deduct box (Note: All state employees appointed by Long were required to give five to ten percent of their wage to Long. These funds were kept in the deduct box.) was. Long replied, "I'll tell you later, Seymour." The deduct box was never found. Long traveled to the Louisiana State Capitol in Baton Rouge in order to pass House Bill Number One, a redistricting plan which would oust political opponent Judge Benjamin Henry Pavy.

At 9:20 p.m., just after passage of the bill effectively removing Pavy, Long left the House, followed by an entourage. As he proceeded down a corridor, Pavy's son-in-law Carl Weiss stepped out from behind a column, and, according to the official version of events, fired a 1 shot with an FN Model 1910 semi-automatic pistol from four feet (1.2 m) away. Long was struck in the torso, yelped, and ran down a hallway "like a hit deer", one witness claimed. Long's bodyguards, nicknamed the "Cossacks" or "skullcrushers", responded by firing at Weiss with their own pistols, killing him; an eyewitness report claimed that Weiss had been shot more than sixty times by the bodyguards. Long was able to run down a flight of stairs and across the capitol grounds, hailing a car to take him to the Our Lady of the Lake Hospital.

Long was rushed to the hospital, where an emergency surgery was held to close perforations in his intestines. Long's condition improved within several hours and he appeared to be recovering. However, by the next morning it was realized that Long was hemorrhaging from his kidney. It was concluded that Long was too weak to survive from a second surgery. Long died at 4:10 a.m. on Tuesday, September 10, thirty-one hours after being shot. According to different sources, his last words were either "I wonder what will happen to my poor university boys" or "God, don't let me die. I have so much to do". There has been controversy about whether Long could have survived with better surgical care; biographer T. Harry Williams concluded that Long died as a result of medical incompetence. Alan Brinkley wrote that Long's doctors "hopelessly bungled" the operation.

An autopsy was not conducted on Long or Weiss (until Weiss's exhumation in 1991).

== Perpetrator ==
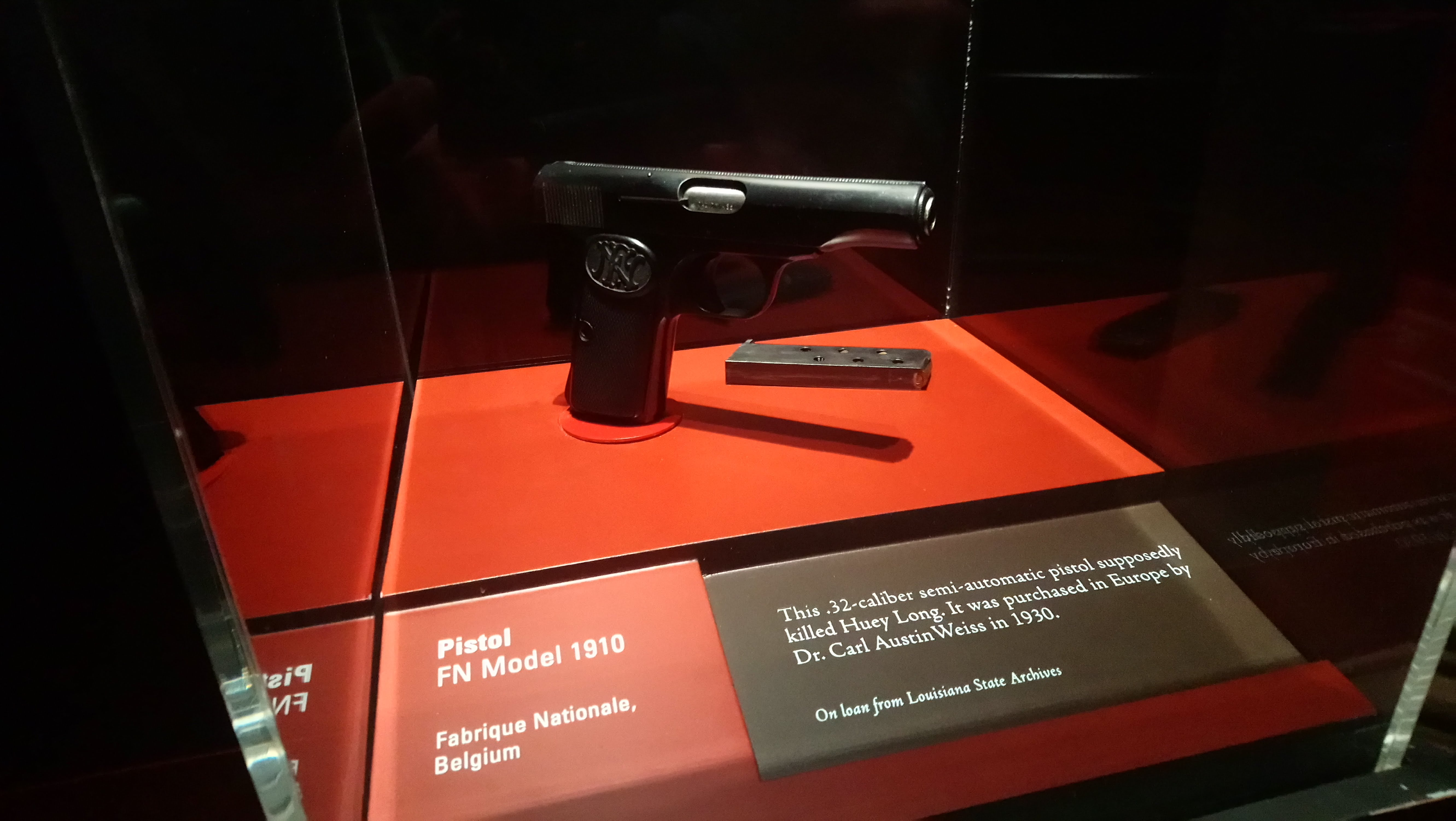
The FN Model 1910 which Carl Weiss allegedly used to shoot Huey Long, on display at the Old State Capitol

The assassin Weiss was a well-respected 28-year-old ear, nose, and throat specialist from Baton Rouge. His father was president of the Louisiana Medical Society. Weiss was not involved in politics and had just had a son with his wife Yvonne, the daughter of Judge Pavy. It was rumored that Long referred to the Pavys as having "Negro blood", possibly motivating Weiss, but there is no written record of Long saying that. Weiss owned a gun which he often carried with him during house-calls, a common practice at the time. Weiss' house was not searched by the authorities after the shooting and there is no evidence that he premeditated the killing.

At the time, Weiss's wife and their families did not accept his guilt. Indeed, Weiss's parents indicated that he had seemed quite happy earlier on the day that Long was shot.

== Countertheory ==
Although most believe that Weiss did confront Long, some claim that he only punched Long. In a 1935 affidavit, nurse Jewel O’Neal, who helped treat the dying Long, claimed that while treating Long's bruised lip, he told her, "That's where he hit me." Proponents of this theory claim that Long was caught in the crossfire as his bodyguards shot at Weiss, being hit by one of the bullets which ricocheted off the marble walls.

Francis Grevemberg, head of the Louisiana State Police in the 1950s, claimed in an affidavit that during a 1953 gambling raid, he heard three state troopers say that bodyguards Joe Messina and Murphy Roden opened fire on Weiss after he punched Long. He also claimed that one of Long's former security guards told him that Weiss's gun was removed from his car and planted at the scene. Grevemberg claims he was told not to investigate. Delmas Sharp Jr., the son of one of Long's bodyguards, claimed that in 1951 his father brought him to a bar owned by Messina. He stated that his father identified Messina as the man who killed Long. Messina turned his back on his colleague but did not deny the claim.

In a 1986 book, Ed Reed claimed that two bullets, not one, were found in Long's body. He relied on testimony from Long's mortician, who claimed that a doctor returned late at night to remove an additional bullet from Long's corpse. This was not the only discrepancy. Weiss’ brother, Tom Ed Weiss, who arrived at the scene an hour after the shooting, claimed that Weiss' car had been moved from where witnesses had seen it at the door of the Capitol and that his brother's gun had been removed from the glove compartment. Additionally, the coroner did not find car keys in Weiss's pockets.

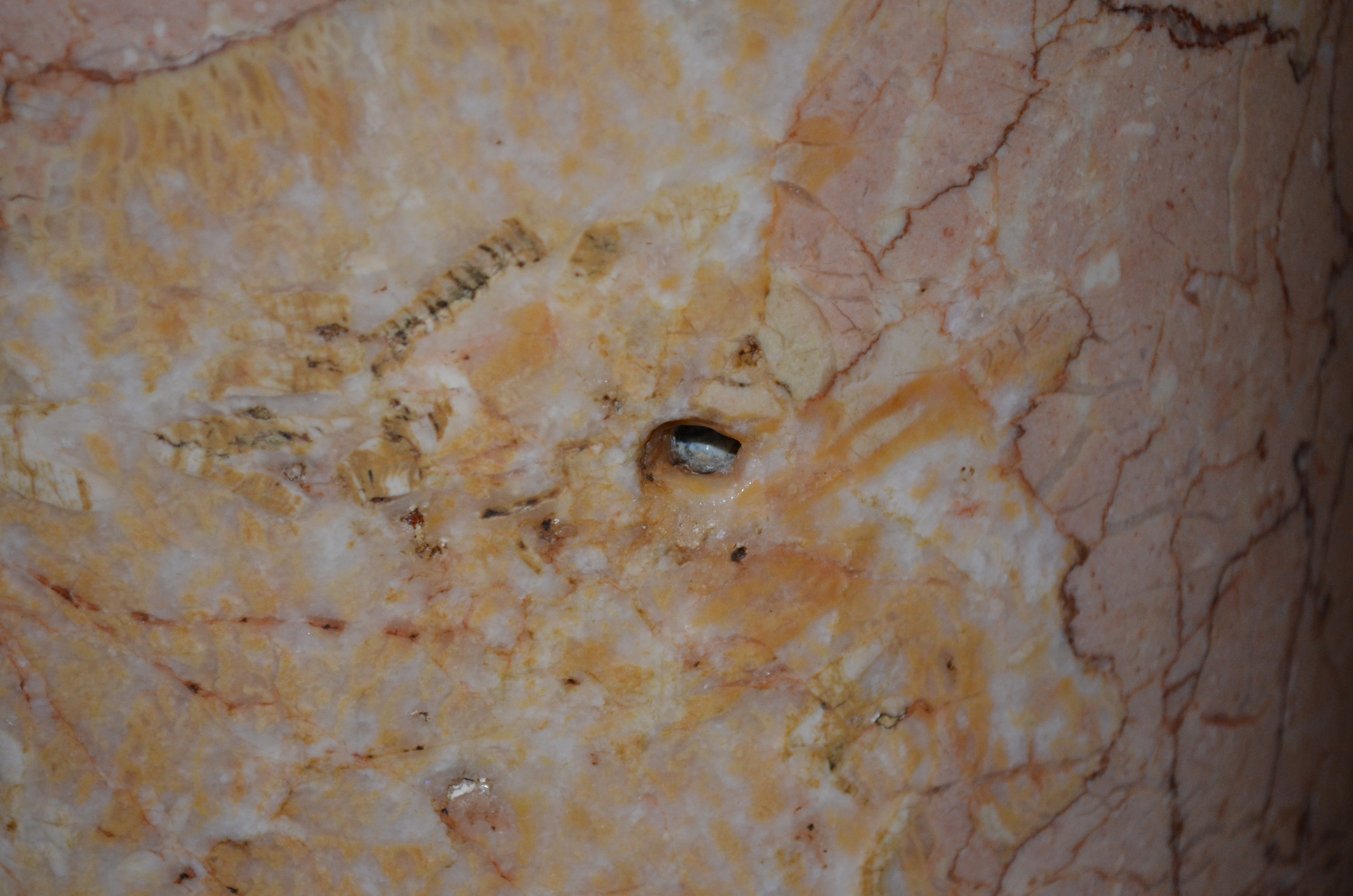
A bullet hole in a marble column, marking a stray bullet from one of Long's bodyguards

Weiss' son, Carl Weiss Jr., believed his father to be innocent: "I don't believe that he fired a fatal shot or indeed that he carried a gun into the state Capitol that night." In a 1985 conversation with Long's son Russell, Weiss learned of the existence of his father's gun. With James Starrs of George Washington University, Weiss located the gun in a New Orleans safe-deposit box owned by Mabel Guerre Binnings, the daughter of Louis Guerre, the state's head of crime investigations in 1935. After a legal battle, she gave up possession of the box in 1991. It contained Weiss' .32 caliber automatic pistol, a .32 caliber bullet that had been fired and had a blunt tip from an impact, and photos of Long's clothing showing a single bullet hole. After firing a test bullet, State Police investigators concluded that the bullet was not fired by Weiss' gun. However, it could not have been from one of the bodyguards as they carried a larger caliber.

As Weiss was never given an autopsy, his body was exhumed in 1991. His remains were examined at the Smithsonian Institution's Museum of Natural History. Although nearly all soft-tissue had decomposed, pathologists were able to study his damaged bones. They concluded that at least 24 bullets struck Weiss, though eyewitness accounts suggested that there had been at least 60. It was likely that a number of bullets had passed through soft-tissue, missing Weiss' bones. They were also able to determine the angle of impact of each bullet: Weiss was shot from the front seven times, thrice from the right, twice from the left, and twelve times from behind. This indicates that Weiss was killed in an erratic crossfire. A .38 caliber slug was found in Weiss' skull, having entered below his left eye. According to ballistics expert Lucien C. Haag, a bullet of this size should have had enough energy to exit the skull. He claimed that this lack of force was indicative of it passing through another body. It is believed that this bullet passed through Weiss' arm: suit fiber was attached to the bullet and there was damage to bones in Weiss' arms. Starrs claims that this suggests that Weiss was in a "defensive posture", with arms raised before him.

After the assassination, the Mutual Life Insurance Company of New York (MONY) dispatched company investigator K. B. Ponder to validate the nature of Long's death. His 1935 report concluded:

There is no doubt that Weiss attacked Long, but there is considerable doubt that Weiss ever fired a gun. ... There is no doubt that his death was accidental, but the consensus of more informed opinion is that he was killed by his own guard and not by Weiss.

In determining that Long's death was accidental, MONY paid a $20,000 life insurance claim to Long's widow. This information was only publicly released in 1985, fifty years after Long's death.

=== Criticism ===
Louisiana State University professor T. Harry Williams dismissed this theory in his Pulitzer Prize-winning 1969 biography of Long:

The suggestion that Huey might have been hit by a wild shot or a ricochet from the guns of the guards had been advanced previously by various individuals, but no one had taken it very seriously, for unless all the witnesses to the event were lying or mistaken, only four shots had been fired while Huey was still in the corridor, the two from Weiss's pistol that struck Huey and Roden's wristwatch, respectively, and the two from the revolvers of Roden and Coleman that dropped Weiss. By the time the other guards had got their guns out and started to fire Huey had run from the scene. But when the suggestion had been made publicly, various people wanted to believe it-members of Weiss' family and anti-politicians, naturally; and persons of the type who sense mystery in any murder case, the kind of people who have created doubts about some of the other great American assassinations.

== Aftermath and legacy ==
=== Memorial investigations ===
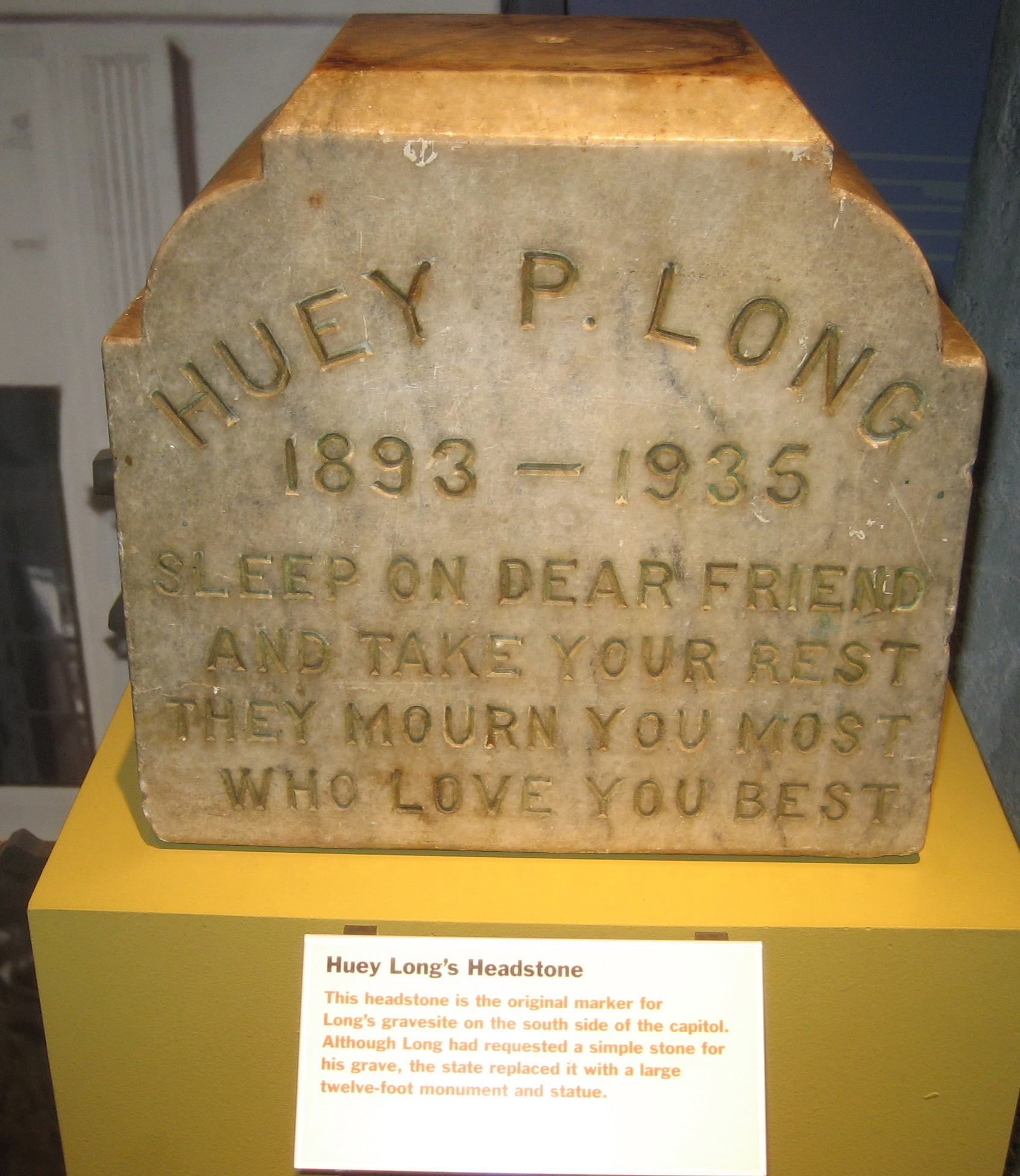
Long's original headstone

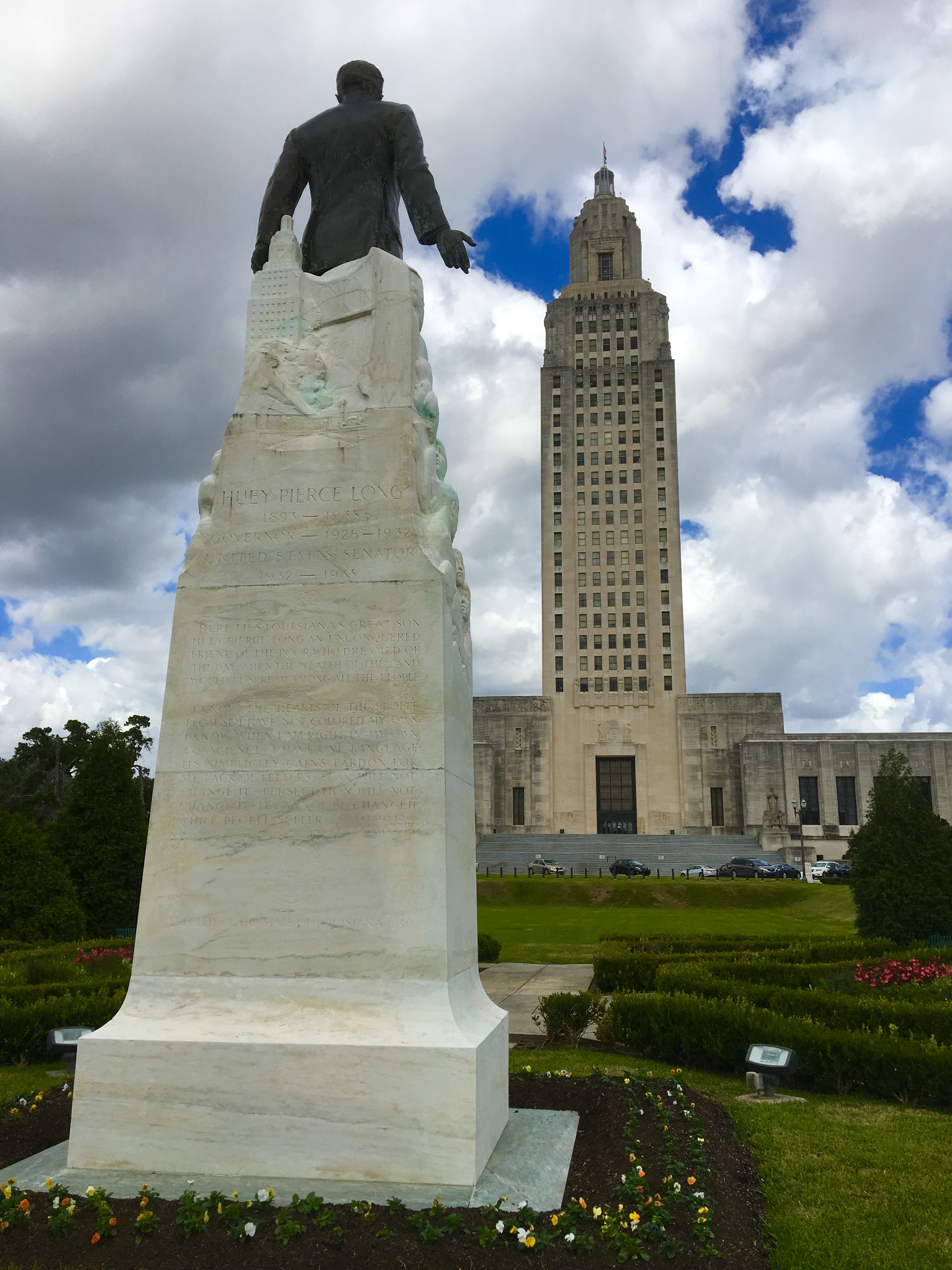
Long's grave and statue before the capitol

Long's body, dressed in a tuxedo, lay in an open double casket (of bronze with a glass lid) in the State Capitol rotunda. Some 200,000 people entered Baton Rouge for his funeral. Tens of thousands saw the funeral in front of the Capitol on September 12; presiding was Gerald L. K. Smith, co-founder of Share Our Wealth and subsequently of the America First Party. Long was buried on the grounds of the Capitol, and a statue at his grave depicts his achievements. Within the Capitol, a plaque marks the site of the assassination.

On September 16, 1935, an inquest was held by state authorities. Only fervent Long supporters were allowed to testify, including a judge who hadn't witnessed the shooting. No ballistic or medical evidence was examined. Long's allies in the Democratic Party quickly took advantage of the situation, insinuating that the assassination was part of a larger conspiracy, labeling their opponents the "Assassination Party" and publishing a fifty-page propaganda pamphlet titled "Why Huey Long Was Killed!!" However, a federal probe found no evidence of a political conspiracy. In the following gubernatorial election, pro-Long campaigners carried containers of faux blood, declaring, "Here it is, like the blood Huey Long shed for you, the blood that stained the floor as it poured from his body. Are you going to vote for those who planned this deed and carried it into execution?" Their chosen candidate, Oscar K. Allen, was elected in a landslide.

=== 1936 election ===
Long's death brought relief to the Roosevelt administration, which would go on to win in a landslide in the 1936 election. Democratic National Committee Chairman James Farley publicly admitted his apprehension of campaigning against Long: "I always laughed Huey off, but I did not feel that way about him." Roosevelt's close economic advisor Rexford Tugwell would later write: "When he was gone it seemed that a beneficent peace had fallen on the land. Father Coughlin, Reno, Townsend, et al., were after all pygmies compared with Huey. He had been a major phenomenon." Tugwell also wrote that Roosevelt regarded Long's assassination as a "providential occurrence".

=== Cultural and societal impact ===
Long's assassination turned him into a near legendary figure in some parts of Louisiana. In 1938, Swedish sociologist Gunnar Myrdal encountered rural children who not only insisted Long was alive, but that he was president. A 1940 Gallup poll found that 55% of Louisianians viewed Long as a positive influence, while just 22% viewed him negatively.

== See also ==
- Assassination of Robert F. Kennedy
- List of assassinated American politicians
- List of members of the United States Congress killed or wounded in office
- List of members of the United States Congress who died in office (1900–1949)
