= 1950 Missouri State Auditor election =

- November 7, 1950

Nominee	W. H. Holmes	William Barton
Party	Democratic	Republican
Popular vote	676,010	586,485
Percentage	53.45%	46.37%
State Auditor before election
W. H. Holmes
Democratic
Elected State Auditor
W. H. Holmes
Democratic

The 1950 Missouri State Auditor election was held on November 7, 1950, in order to elect the state auditor of Missouri. Democratic nominee and incumbent state auditor W. H. Holmes defeated Republican nominee William Barton, Progressive nominee Howard R. Edsell, Christian Nationalist nominee O. M. Tanner, Prohibition nominee Bertha M. Boutell, Socialist nominee Elizabeth Erbe and Socialist Labor nominee Theodore Baeff.

== General election ==
On election day, November 7, 1950, Democratic nominee W. H. Holmes won re-election by a margin of 89,525 votes against his foremost opponent Republican nominee William Barton, thereby retaining Democratic control over the office of state auditor. Holmes was sworn in for his second term on January 8, 1951.

=== Results ===
Missouri State Auditor election, 1950
Party	Candidate	Votes	%
Democratic	W. H. Holmes (incumbent)	676,010	53.45
Republican	William Barton	586,485	46.37
Progressive	Howard R. Edsell	713	0.06
Christian Nationalist Party	O. M. Tanner	590	0.05
Prohibition	Bertha M. Boutell	573	0.05
Socialist	Elizabeth Erbe	246	0.01
Socialist Labor	Theodore Baeff	98	0.01
Total votes		1,264,715	100.00
Democratic hold			
