= American Progress (newspaper) =

Defunct newspaper in New Orleans, Louisiana

Louisiana/American Progress
- Owner: Huey Long
- Founder: Huey Long
- Founded: March 27, 1930
- Ceased publication: March 1940
- Language: English
- OCLC number: 10266590

The American Progress was an American newspaper founded by Democratic Louisiana Governor Huey Long in March 1930 as the Louisiana Progress to promote his political aims and attack his opponents. He forced state employees to subscribe and distribute copies, plus state agencies had to place ads.

The paper was renamed in 1935 and went national to promote then Senator Long's Share Our Wealth program and his ambitions for running for the presidency of the United States in the 1936 election. It was mailed free to his followers and circulation varied from 300,000 to 1.5 million for special issues. The paper was paid for by contributions from the Long political machine in Louisiana.

After Long's assassination in 1935, the paper was taken over by Governor Richard W. Leche and then bought by his successor Earl Long. The paper shut down in March 1940 after Long lost his reelection bid.

The first mention of the concept of the "1% and the 99%" may very well be found in a poster (1935) advertising the newspaper. The second paragraph mentioned the one percent and the ninety-nine percent: "With 1% of our people owning nearly twice as much as all the other 99%, how is a country ever to have permanent progress unless there is a correction of this evil?"
