= Share Our Wealth =

Proposed American 1930s wealth distribution idea

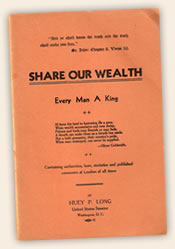
Cover of a 1935 Share our Wealth booklet

Share Our Wealth was a movement that began in February 1934, during the Great Depression, by Huey Long, a governor and later United States Senator from Louisiana. Long first proposed the plan in a national radio address, which is now referred to as the "Share Our Wealth Speech". To stimulate the economy, the Share Our Wealth program called for massive federal spending, a wealth tax, and wealth redistribution. These proposals drew wide support, with millions joining local Share Our Wealth clubs. Roosevelt adopted many of these proposals in the Second New Deal.

== Background ==
Long believed that the underlying cause of the Great Depression – which he called "Mr. Roosevelt's depression" – was the growing disparity between the rich and everyone else. For most of his political career, he focused his speeches and efforts on the "little man", referring to the rural poor. The Share Our Wealth program was intended to become the capstone project for Long's agenda.

== Proposed legislation ==
In March 1933, Long offered a series of bills collectively known as "the Long plan" for the redistribution of wealth. The first bill proposed a new progressive tax code designed to cap personal fortunes at $100 million ($2.372 billion in 2024 dollars). Fortunes above $1 million ($23.72 million in 2024) would be taxed at 1%; fortunes above $2 million ($47.45 million in 2024) would be taxed at 2%, and so forth, up to a 100% tax on fortunes greater than $100 million. The second bill would limit annual income to $1 million ($23.72 million in 2024), and the third bill would cap individual inheritances at $5 million ($118.6 million in 2024).

External videos
- Long's "Share the Wealth" speech on YouTube

In February 1934, Long introduced his "Share Our Wealth" plan over a nationwide radio broadcast.

His plan was to minimize wealth inequality, via federal tax and spend policy.

An individual's right to wealth would be restricted to:

- a maximum inheritance of $5 million ($118.6 million in 2024);
- a maximum annual income of $1 million ($23.72 million in 2024);
- and an individual's private wealth/fortune to $50 million ($1.186 billion in 2024).

The taxes raised would guarantee every family what Long called a "Household Estate" of $5,000 (a Basic Household Grant worth $118,600 in 2024) and a minimum annual income of $2,000–$3,000 (a Universal Basic Income to each household of $47,450–$71,175 per year, 2024), or one-third of the average family home value and income.

- free higher education (including degree-level study at a college, and vocational internships/training required to enter professional organizations);
- a mandatory 30-hour (four day) working week and a minimum of four weeks paid vacation per year
- a pension of $30/month, $360 a year ($711.73 and $8,540.76 in 2024) paid to every person from the age of 65;
- for direct federal assistance to farmers;
- public works projects, including a $10 billion ($237.2 billion in 2024) land reclamation project to end the Dust Bowl;
- specific to the WWI veterans, benefits would increase, and World War I veteran's adjusted Compensation certificates, due in 1945 would be issued immediately.
- free medical services for all citizens, and what he called a "war on disease" led by the Mayo brothers.

Long intended for his reforms to bring an end to the Great Depression.

== Reception ==
=== Economic criticism ===
Long's plans for the "Share Our Wealth" program attracted much criticism from economists at the time, who stated that Long's plans for redistributing wealth would not result in every American family receiving a grant of $5,000 per year, but rather $400/per year, and that his plans for taxation would cap the average annual income at about $3,000. They argued that the confiscated fortunes would only yield $1.50 per each poor family. In 1934, Long held a public debate with Norman Thomas, the leader of the Socialist Party of America, on the merits of Share Our Wealth versus socialism.

Some issues of American Progress reached a circulation of over 1.5 million.

=== Share Our Wealth club ===
With the Senate unwilling to support his proposals, in February 1934 Long formed a national political organization, the Share Our Wealth Society. A network of local clubs led by national organizer Reverend Gerald L. K. Smith, the Share Our Wealth Society was intended to operate outside of and in opposition to the Democratic Party and the Roosevelt administration. By 1935, the society had over 7.5 million members in 27,000 clubs across the country. Long's Senate office received an average of 60,000 letters a week, resulting in Long hiring 48 stenographers to type responses. Of the two trucks that delivered mail to the Senate, one was devoted solely to mail for Long. Long's newspaper, now renamed American Progress, averaged a circulation of 300,000, with some issues reaching over 1.5 million. Long's radical programs were very attractive to union-members; Teamsters president Daniel J. Tobin expressed his growing concerns to Roosevelt. Long also drew international attention: writer H. G. Wells traveled across the Atlantic just to interview Long. Wells noted that Long was "like a Winston Churchill who has never been at Harrow. He abounds in promises."

== Legacy ==
=== Program mismanagement after Long's death ===
Any presidential ambitions which Long might have had were cut short when he was shot by an assassin in Baton Rouge, Louisiana on September 8, 1935; he died two days later. Control of the Share Our Wealth Society fell to Gerald L. K. Smith, who was widely viewed as a political demagogue. Smith brought the Share Our Wealth Society into a brief coalition with the followers of radio priest Charles Coughlin and old-age pension advocate Francis Townsend in support of the short-lived Union Party, a third party effort which ran William Lemke of North Dakota for President in 1936, but under his leadership, the Share Our Wealth movement quickly fell apart.

=== Influence on the New Deal ===
Some historians believe that pressure from Long and his organization contributed to Roosevelt's "turn to the left" in the Second New Deal (1935), which consisted of the Social Security Act, the Works Progress Administration, the National Labor Relations Board, Aid to Dependent Children, and the Wealth Tax Act of 1935. Each tenet of the Second New Deal seemed to foil one of Long's corresponding proposals. For example, Roosevelt's National Youth Administration provided part-time employment to the country's youth, counteracting the appeal for Long's free college proposal. Roosevelt reportedly admitted in private to trying to "steal Long's thunder."

== See also ==
- Common Prosperity
- Basic income
- Distributism
- End Poverty in California movement
