= Gerald L. K. Smith =

American politician and clergyman (1898–1976)

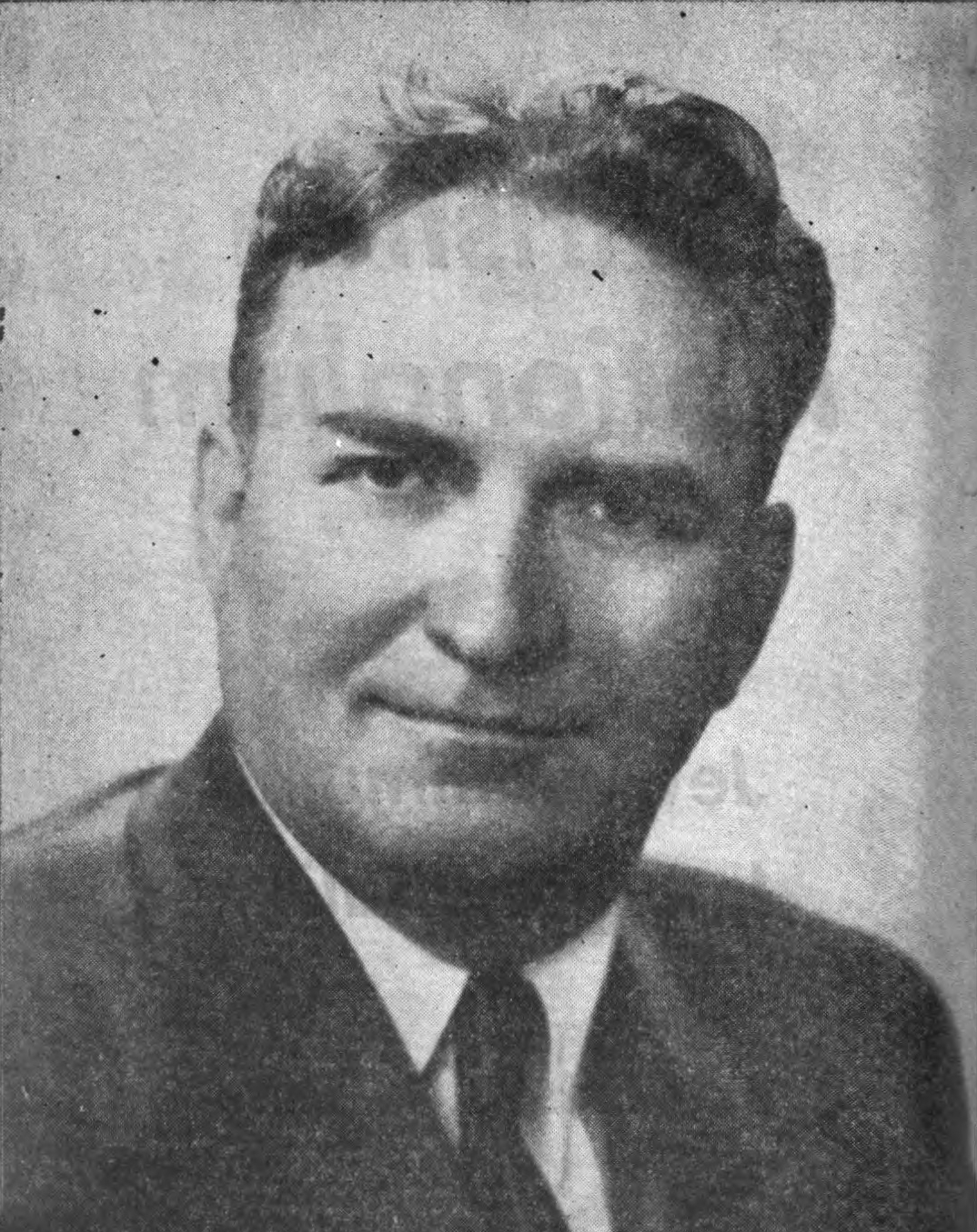
- Smith c. 1947–1952
- Born: Gerald Lyman Kenneth Smith; February 27, 1898; Pardeeville, Wisconsin, U.S.
- Died: April 15, 1976 (aged 78); Glendale, California, U.S.
- Resting place: Eureka Springs, Arkansas; 36.408633°N 93.725986°W
- Education: Valparaiso University (BBS)
- Political party: Democratic (before 1935); Union (1935–1936); Republican (1936–1943); America First (1943–1947); Christian Nationalist (after 1947)
- Other political affiliations: Silver Legion (1933–1941); Share Our Wealth (1934–1936)
- Spouse: Elna Sorenson (m. 1922)
- Children: 1

Gerald Lyman Kenneth Smith (February 27, 1898 – April 15, 1976) was an American Disciples clergyman, politician and organizer known for his populist and far-right activism. He began his career as a leader of the Share Our Wealth movement during the Great Depression. After the death of Huey Long he shifted away from advocating wealth redistribution towards anti-communism and later anti-semitism, becoming known for far-right causes. He founded the America First Party in 1943 and was its 1944 presidential candidate, winning fewer than 1,800 votes. In 1947, he founded the Christian Nationalist Party, which would become the Christian Nationalist Crusade, a vehicle that would lead to the emergence of Christian Identity as an organized movement.

Smith has been noted as "the most persistently successful of America's anti-Jewish propagandists" and "the most infamous American fascist".

Late in life, he built the Christ of the Ozarks statue in Eureka Springs, Arkansas, and initiated the Passion Play there.

== Early life and education ==
Gerald Lyman Kenneth Smith was born on February 27, 1898, in Pardeeville, Wisconsin, to Sarah and Lyman Z. Smith. He had one sister, Barbara, who was ten years older. His father was a traveling salesman and preacher who spoke on patriotic occasions and was a supporter of politician Robert La Follette. Gerald Smith said of his childhood, "We took it for granted that the word 'Christian' was the companion for the word 'American.'" The family moved to rural Richland County, Wisconsin, and Gerald Smith received a public education, first at rural schools and then at a larger school in Viola. After Lyman Smith recovered from pernicious anemia, which he had suffered from during most of his son's childhood, the family moved to Viroqua, Wisconsin, where Gerald Smith graduated high school in 1915.

In 1918, after two and a half years of study, Smith graduated from Valparaiso University in Indiana with a degree in biblical studies. Smith enlisted in the United States Army but was not deployed before the end of World War I. An attack of nephritis forced him to return to Viroqua to recuperate.

== Ministry ==
Smith said that he determined he would be a Disciples of Christ minister, like three generations of his family before him, when he was twelve. He was ordained in 1916, while at Valparaiso. Upon his recovery from nephritis in 1919, he became a temporary pastor in Soldiers Grove, Wisconsin, then at a larger church in Footville, then organized another church in the larger community of Beloit. On return from a trip to Chicago, he expressed his earliest recorded views on race in a letter to his parents: "[W]hen you see the white and black mixing it is terrible. White girls dancing cheek to cheek with black men. ... It sickens one."

After marriage and another period of illness, Smith joined a larger church in Kansas, Illinois. In 1922, he drew national attention for a sermon at a ministerial convention in St. Louis and moved to Indianapolis, where he preached to a congregation of two thousand. In Indianapolis, rumors circulated that he was a member of the Ku Klux Klan, an accusation Smith denied throughout his life.

In 1929, Smith's wife contracted tuberculosis, and he moved his family to Shreveport, Louisiana, to seek treatment. He became minister of Kings Highway Christian Church, where his congregation included the city's mayor, two bank presidents, and the president of the Chamber of Commerce. In his early time in Shreveport, Smith was ecumenical, preaching at B'Nai Zion Temple and in return sharing his pulpit with the temple's rabbi.

== Politics ==
=== Huey Long and Share Our Wealth ===
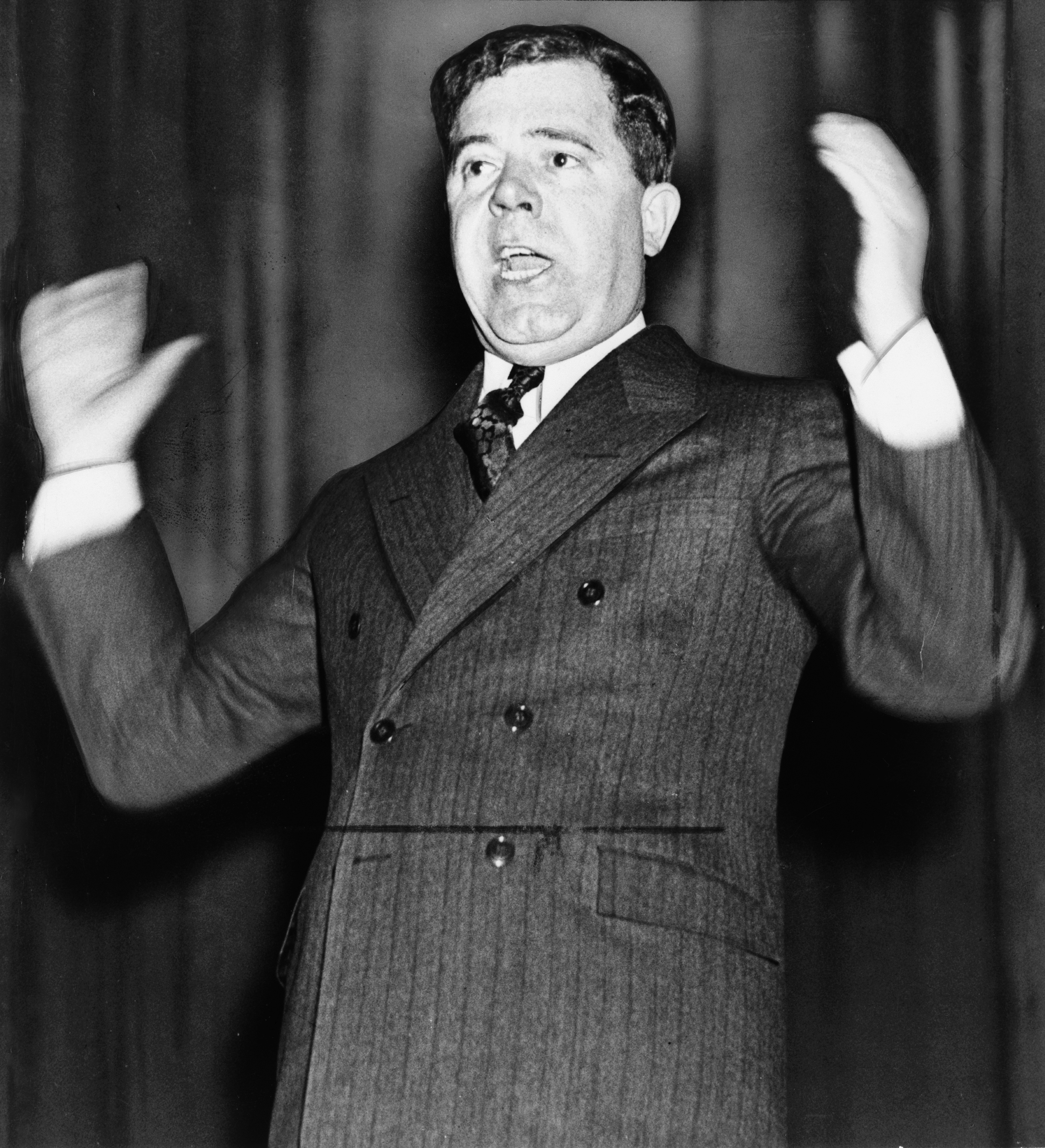
Smith came to prominence as the national organizer of Huey Long's Share Our Wealth Society.

Upon his move to Shreveport, shortly after the 1929 stock market crash, Smith began to engage more actively in politics. He became chaplain of the Louisiana American Federation of Labor and delivered a keynote at the Louisiana chapter meeting of the American Bankers' Association. He also began preaching radio sermons calling for social reform and denouncing the Standard Oil Company.

Shortly after his arrival in the city, Smith met Governor Huey P. Long, who maintained a law office there. His friendship with Long ultimately forced his resignation from his church in 1933, as many of the congregation were opposed to Long. Following his resignation, Smith allegedly turned toward fascist politics by contacting William Dudley Pelley and attempting to reach Adolf Hitler to discuss "Semitic" and "anti-German" propaganda.

In 1934, Long formed the Share Our Wealth Society, which proposed minimum and maximum limits on household wealth and income, and named Smith its national organizer. In describing his campaign philosophy, Smith wrote that "in order to succeed, a mass movement must be superficial for quick appeal, fundamental for permanence, dogmatic for certainty, and practical for workability." Smith delivered campaign speeches for Share Our Wealth throughout the country, described as "a combination of Savonarola and Elmer Gantry" and often drawing large crowds of supporters and hecklers. In 1935, he boasted to a reporter that he might "duplicate the feat of Adolph Hitler in Germany". Behind the scenes, he encouraged Long to challenge President Franklin D. Roosevelt in 1936.

After Long was assassinated in 1935, Smith failed to take control of the Long faction in Louisiana and was effectively expelled from the state politically by Seymour Weiss. Smith was fired from Share Our Wealth, which was soon abolished.

=== Union Party ===
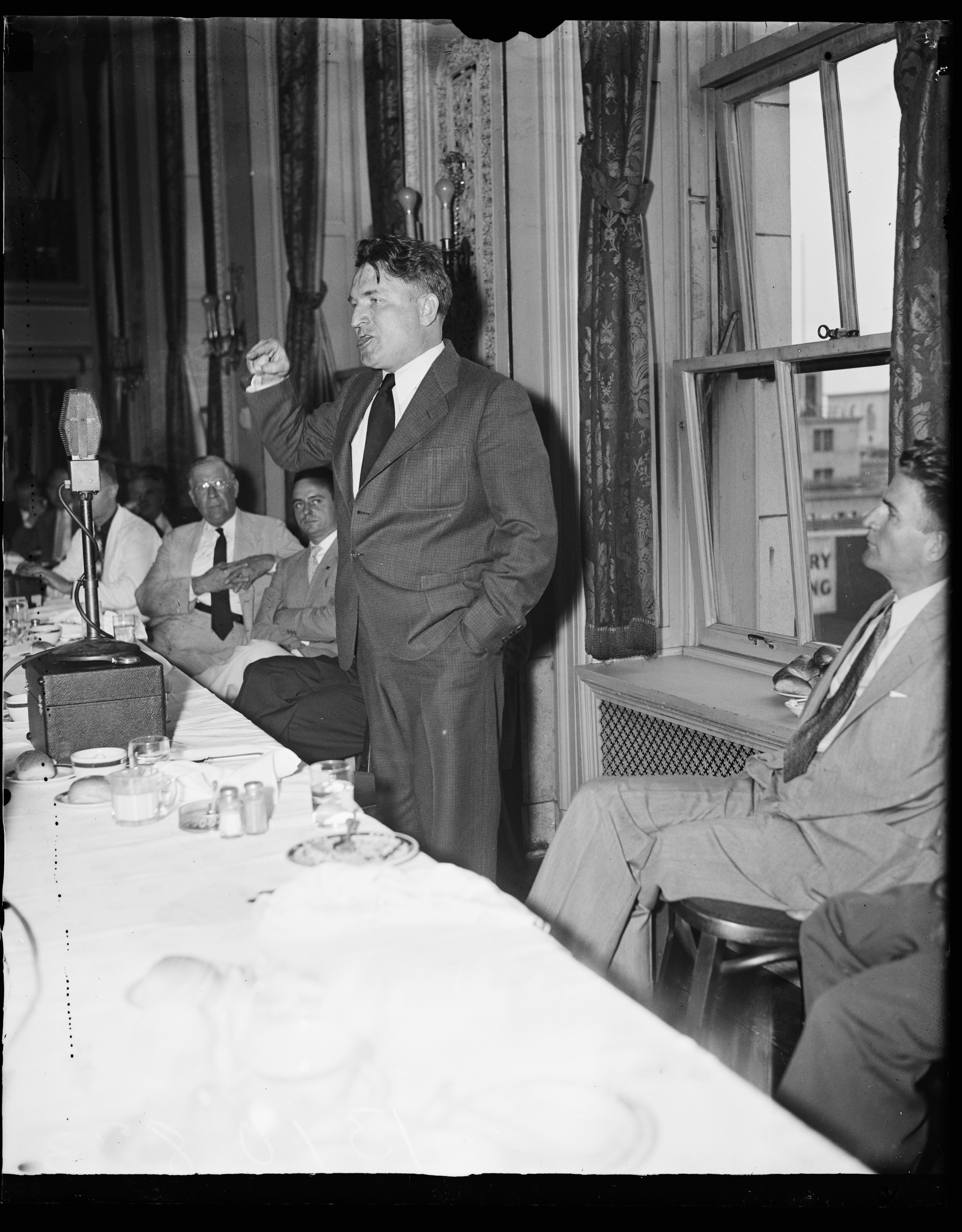
Smith attacks the New Deal in a speech before the press, 1936

After departing Louisiana, Smith campaigned in Georgia for white supremacist Governor Eugene Talmadge, who intended to oppose Roosevelt for the 1936 Democratic nomination. Smith then joined Francis Townsend, an advocate of pension reform, in New York City on the incorrect belief that Townsend had acquired Long's mailing list. Smith soon ingratiated himself to Townsend against the misgivings of many of Townsend's advisors. In November 1935, Smith convinced Townsend to join with Charles Coughlin, an anti-Roosevelt Roman Catholic priest, to back William Lemke for president to oppose, in Smith's words, "the communistic philosophy of [Roosevelt advisors] Frankfurter, Ickes, Hopkins, and Wallace".

Late in the 1936 campaign, Smith announced his intent to form an independent movement to oppose communism and "seize the government of the United States." He claimed support from "ten million patriots" willing to sacrifice their lives to prevent "an international plot to collectivize [the United States]" and from wealthy donors who would provide one percent of their annual incomes "to make America vigorously nationalistic." Townsend promptly disowned Smith and Lemke's campaign manager expelled him from the Union Party, despite his protests. Coughlin ignored the controversy, having already developed antipathy toward Smith during the campaign.

In the fall of 1936, Smith returned to Louisiana to join former Governor James A. Noe in a tour of Louisiana in which the two railed against Governor Richard W. Leche's sales tax on luxury items, revenue that the governor claimed was essential for the state's share of the new Social Security program. Noe charged that Leche "sold out to Roosevelt to finance Social Security." On October 22, he was punched in the face after delivering a radio talk in New Orleans. On the night before the election, he was arrested for disturbing the peace, reviling the police, and using obscene language after attacking Leche on statewide radio. Despite the boasts of Smith, Townsend, and Coughlin, the Union ticket received only 2 percent of the national vote, mostly in Catholic precincts where Coughlin's popularity was strongest; within two years, the party collapsed entirely.

=== America First Party of 1943 ===
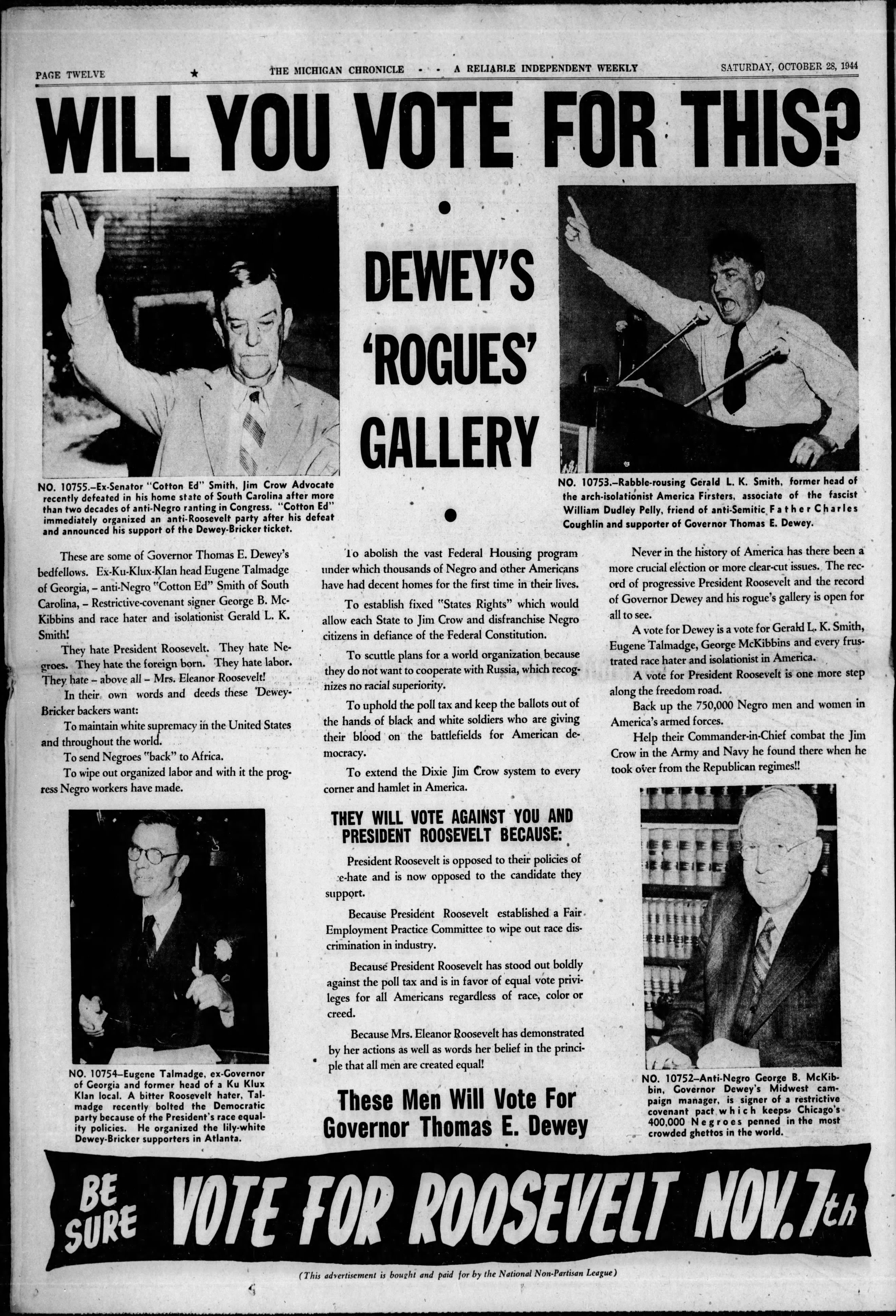
Anti-Taft pro-Roosevelt attack ad published by the "National Non-Partisan League" in "The Michigan Chronicle " on October 28, 1944

As European tensions rose with the ascendancy of the Nazi Party in Germany, Smith tried to form an alliance with the non-interventionist America First Committee, but did not succeed.

In 1943, Smith formed the America First Party, essentially appropriating the name. He became a member of William Dudley Pelley's fascist Silver Legion of America, which was patterned after Hitler's brown shirts. Smith told an audience of Silver Shirts, "We're going to drive that cripple out of the White House," meaning Franklin Delano Roosevelt.

After moving to Michigan, Smith ran for the United States Senate as a Republican from there, but lost in the primary.

Smith ran as the America First Party candidate in the 1944 presidential election, winning 1,781 votes (1530 in Michigan, 251 in Texas). In 1948, with running mate Harry Romer on the Christian Nationalist Party ticket, he received 48 votes. Smith's only other bid for the presidency was in 1956, when he received eight write-in votes in California.

Of his run for president, Smith biographer Glen Jeansonne wrote, "Smith was fascinated by the Office of the President of the United States", and that "Gerald Smith ran for president because he lusted for power, but his hatred for Jews and his relentless crusade against them had no such 'rational' motivation".

=== Christian Nationalist Crusade ===
In 1947, speaking at a sparsely attended rally at the Washington Monument. Smith announced a new name, the Christian Nationalist Party, to replace the America First Party. Moving forward Smith's agenda was the Christian Nationalist Crusade. The Anti-Defamation League of B'nai Brith cited Smith's Christian Nationalist Crusade along with Merwin K. Hart's National Economic Council and the Ku Klux Klan as "organized anti-Jewish organizations... which had significant influence, resources and membership." In late 1947, Smith moved CNC offices from Detroit to St. Louis.

=== Christian Identity ===
Having first visited Los Angeles in 1943, Smith traveled there every year and after purchasing a home, he moved his headquarters to Los Angeles in 1953. It was in Los Angeles that he would intersect with key figures that would emerge in the Christian Identity movement, including Conrad Gaard, Bertrand Comparet, William Potter Gale, and Wesley Swift. Smith incorporated religious issues to further his political goals by mobilizing the support of Christian Identity. Prior to Smith's involvement in the Identity movement, it had been largely a fractured amalgamation of various British-Israel groups and other derivative groups such as the Klan. Smith's organizational skills and ability to cultivate prominent figures like Swift assisted in coalescing the Identity movement into a more collaborative group of churches and individuals.

Professor of political science Michael Barkun suggests that for all that Smith contributed to the Identity, that he may not actually have been a believer himself, simply using the ideas and network to further his political agenda. On the side of considering Smith a believer in Identity, he once wrote of Wesley Swift that "he opened up the Bible.... He identified the 'true Israel which gave us the Messiah, and demonstrated to me with the proper texts that Christ's worst enemies were not God's chosen people... [and that] we were indeed Israelites... He demonstrated that the crucifiers of Christ were apostates, sons of Satan, and the seed of Cain". Smith regularly penned religious articles in the Christian Nationalist Crusade's publication, The Cross and the Flag, that would indicate a leaning toward serpent seed doctrine. However, he rarely allowed his many Identity associates to author articles for The Cross and the Flag. Further, as Barkun notes, "Considering how much Smith wrote, and how close his ties with Identity figures were, it is remarkable how few Identity references occur in his publications, and how much of his religious writing maintains the orthodox view that 'Israel' consists of all those who have accepted Jesus as Savior." Ultimately, Smith's importance to Christian Identity was in the role he played in linking together the previously disjointed West Coast Identity community, and his association with Wesley Swift would make Smith's Christian Nationalist Crusade a key vehicle in the expansion of Christian Identity.

=== Post-war activities ===
In 1946, Smith was sentenced to 60 days in jail for contempt in court for Illinois for misconduct at the trial of Arthur Terminiello, a Catholic priest charged over inflammatory comments made against various racial groups. His publicity agent, Don Lohbeck, was sentenced to 30 days in jail.

In the early 1950s, at the time of the appointment of Anna M. Rosenberg as Assistant Secretary of Defense, the Anti-Defamation League published an article attributing the attacks on Rosenberg's loyalty to "professional anti-Semites and lunatic nationalists", including the "Jew-baiting cabal of John Rankin, Benjamin Freedman and Gerald Smith". Smith's activism in the Los Angeles area was opposed by a coalition of Jewish and black groups; a headline in the B'nai B'rith Messenger called him "the Little Fuehrer".

In 1956, Smith joined a strong campaign against the Alaska Mental Health Enabling Act. He was among such opponents as those who nicknamed it the "Siberia Bill" and denounced it as being part of a communist plot to hospitalize and brainwash Americans. It was a bipartisan, federal effort to improve mental health care for residents of Alaska, which was still a territory, and its passage was aided by the support of the conservative senator Barry Goldwater.

The Christian Nationalist platform called for deportations of Jews and African Americans. Smith and his groups also targeted screeds against Catholics, President Dwight D. Eisenhower, and others. In 1959, the Cross and the Flag, the Christian Nationalist Crusade's magazine, claimed that six million Jews were not killed in death camps in Europe during World War II but instead immigrated to the United States during the war.

=== Last years ===
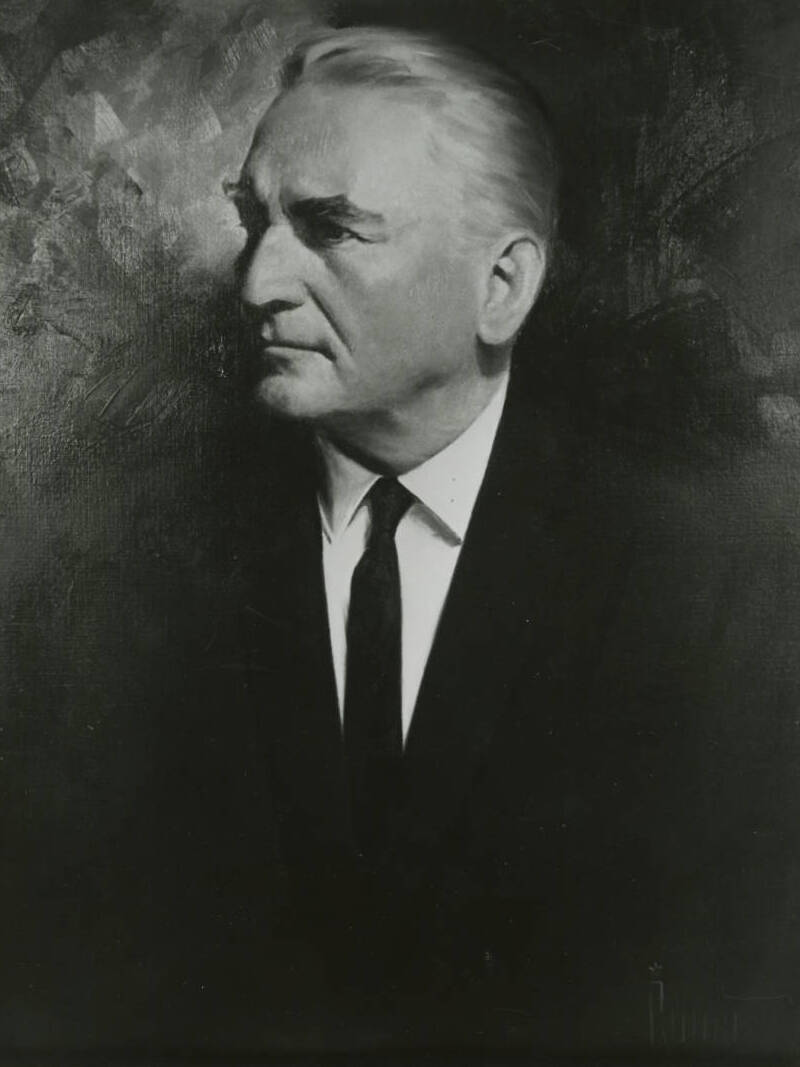
Portrait of Smith c. 1970

Smith eventually moved to Eureka Springs, Arkansas, where he bought and renovated a mansion as a retirement home. In 1964, he began construction of a planned religious theme park on his own property, to be called "Sacred Projects". Smith's biographer, Glen Jeansonne, in Gerald L. K. Smith: Minister of Hate, writes that Smith only had $5,000 to his name at the end of 1963 and yet raised $1,000,000 by the spring of 1964 to commission and construct the "Christ of the Ozarks" project.

Although the park was never fully developed, in 1966 the centerpiece, the Christ of the Ozarks statue, was completed on Magnetic Mountain at an elevation of 1,500 feet, from where it overlooked the town. Emmet Sullivan, the sculptor, had worked under Gutzon Borglum as one of the sculptors of Mount Rushmore.

Smith's original plans were for a life-size recreation of ancient Jerusalem in the hills near Eureka Springs; no construction of this portion took place. He did initiate an annual outdoor Passion Play, inspired by another passion play which is performed every ten years in the town of Oberammergau, Germany. It is staged in an amphitheater located near the statue for several nights each week from late April through late October.

== Personal life and death ==
Smith married Elna Sorenson on June 21, 1922. The couple adopted their only child, whom they named Gerald L. K. Smith Jr.

Smith died age 78 on April 15, 1976, of pneumonia in Glendale, California. His wife took over the Christian Nationalist Crusade at his death. With his wife, he is buried adjacent to the Christ of the Ozarks statue, where hymns are continuously played near the graves.

== Works ==
Smith is claimed to be the originator of the following quotation, often wrongly attributed to others (in particular Baptist pastor, author, and political commentator Adrian Rogers, who quoted it in a sermon without attribution):

"You cannot legislate the poor into freedom by legislating the wealthy out of freedom. What one person receives without working for, another person must work for without receiving. The government cannot give to anybody anything that the government does not first take from somebody else. When half of the people get the idea that they do not have to work because the other half is going to take care of them, and when the other half gets the idea that it does no good to work because somebody else is going to get what they work for, that my dear friend, is about the end of any nation. You cannot multiply wealth by dividing it."

According to the Congressional Record of 1958, it had also been said by U.S. Senator James Eastland of Mississippi during his address at the November 13, 1957, annual meeting of the Illinois Agricultural Association.

Smith read Henry Ford's book The International Jew, of which he noted, "The day came when I embraced the research of Mr. Ford and his associates and became courageous enough and honest enough and informed enough to use the words: 'Communism is Jewish.'" Smith sold many copies of this book, which he reprinted.

Books published by Smith

- The International Jew: The World's Foremost Problem (prepared by Gerald L. K. Smith)

Books by Smith

- Matters of Life and Death: A Handbook for Patriots dealing with the issues on which America will rise or fall

Books edited by others

- Besieged Patriot: Autobiographical Episodes Exposing Communism, Traitorism, and Zionism from the Life of Gerald L. K. Smith

== See also ==
- 1948 United States presidential election
- Christian nationalism
- Holocaust denial
- Meade McClanahan, Los Angeles City Council member recalled from office in 1946, because of his association with Smith
