= FN Model 1910 =

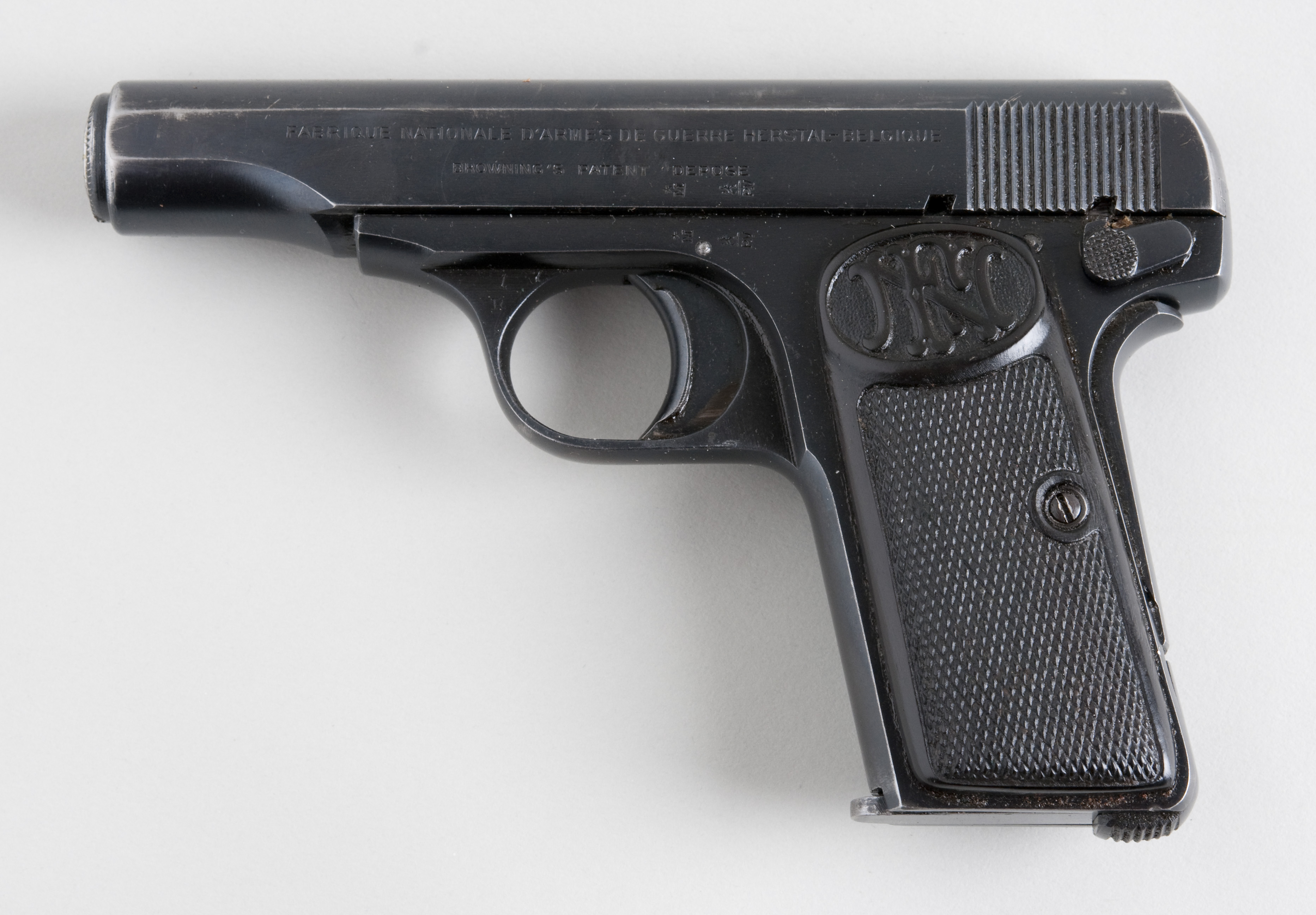
- FN Model 1910
- Type: Semi-automatic pistol
- Place of origin: Kingdom of Belgium

Service history
- Wars: World War I Chaco War; Spanish Civil War; World War II; 1958 Lebanon crisis Lebanese Civil War

Production history
- Designer: John Browning
- Manufacturer: Fabrique Nationale (FN)
- Produced: 1910–1983
- Variants: See Variants

Specifications
- Mass: Model 1910: c. 590 g; Model 1922: c. 700 g (unloaded)
- Length: Model 1910: 153 mm; Model 1922: 178 mm
- Barrel length: Model 1910: 80 mm; Model 1922: 113 mm
- Cartridge: .380 ACP; .32 ACP
- Action: Blowback
- Feed system: Model 1910: 6-round (.380) or 7-round (.32) detachable box magazine; Model 1922: 8-round (.380) or 9-round (.32) detachable box magazine
- Sights: Notch and post iron sights

The FN Model 1910 is a blowback-operated, semi-automatic pistol designed by John Browning and manufactured by Fabrique Nationale of Belgium.

== Development ==
The FN Model 1910, also known as the Browning model 1910, was a departure for Browning. Before, his designs were produced by both FN in Europe and Colt Firearms in the United States. Since Colt did not want to produce it, Browning chose to patent and produce this design in Europe only. Introduced in 1910, this pistol used a novel operating spring location surrounding the barrel. This location became the standard in such future weapons as the Walther PPK and Russian Makarov.

It incorporated the standard Browning striker-firing mechanism and a grip safety along with a magazine safety and an external safety lever (known as the "triple safety") in a compact package. Offered in both .380 ACP (6-round magazine) and .32 ACP (7-round magazine) calibres, it remained in production until 1983. It is possible to switch calibres by changing only the barrel. However, FN never offered packages containing a single pistol with both calibre barrels.

== Variants ==
The FN Model 1922 was also used by the Kingdom of Yugoslavia (60,000 Automatski pistolj (Brauning) 9mm M.22) between 1923 and 1930.

== Use in assassinations ==
An FN M1910, serial number 19074, chambered in .380 ACP was the handgun used by Gavrilo Princip to assassinate Archduke Franz Ferdinand of Austria and his wife Sophie in Sarajevo on 28 June 1914, the act that precipitated the First World War. Numerous previous sources erroneously cited the FN Model 1900 in .32 calibre as being the weapon Princip used. This has led to confusion over the calibre of the pistol actually used.

Paul Doumer, President of France, was assassinated by Russian emigre Paul Gorguloff on 6 May 1932 with a Model 1910 in .32 ACP. The pistol is now in the Musée des Collections Historiques de la Préfecture de Police.

A Model 1910 was also allegedly used to assassinate Huey Long, governor of Louisiana, on 5 September 1935. Physician Carl Weiss, the alleged assassin, bought the FN M1910 in Europe for $25 in 1930. It is now on display Old State Capitol in Baton Rouge.

Hannie Schaft used a model M1922 during her assassinations as part of the Dutch communist resistance against German occupation of the Netherlands.

== Users ==
- Belgium
- Bolivia
- Republic of China
- Denmark
- France
- Finland — In February 1940, 2,500 M1910 and 2,500 M1922 pistols were bought from Belgium and used in the Continuation War
- Nazi Germany — M1910/M1922s were produced at FN after the fall of Belgium for police use
- West Germany
- German Empire
- Kingdom of Greece
- Empire of Japan — Purchased by some officers
- Netherlands — Adopted as the Pistool M.25 no.1 (in 7.65mm Browning) and Pistool M.25 no.2 (in 9mm Browning). Used in the Battle of the Netherlands.
- Peru
- Poland
- Romania
- Spanish Republic — 200 M1922 pistols imported for the air force
- Turkey
- Venezuela
- Yugoslavia — Imported 60,000 FN model 1922 pistols, called the Automatski pistolj (Brauning) 9mm M.22, between 1923 and 1930.

== Gallery ==
A Finnish soldier using a FN M1910 in December 1939 during the Winter War

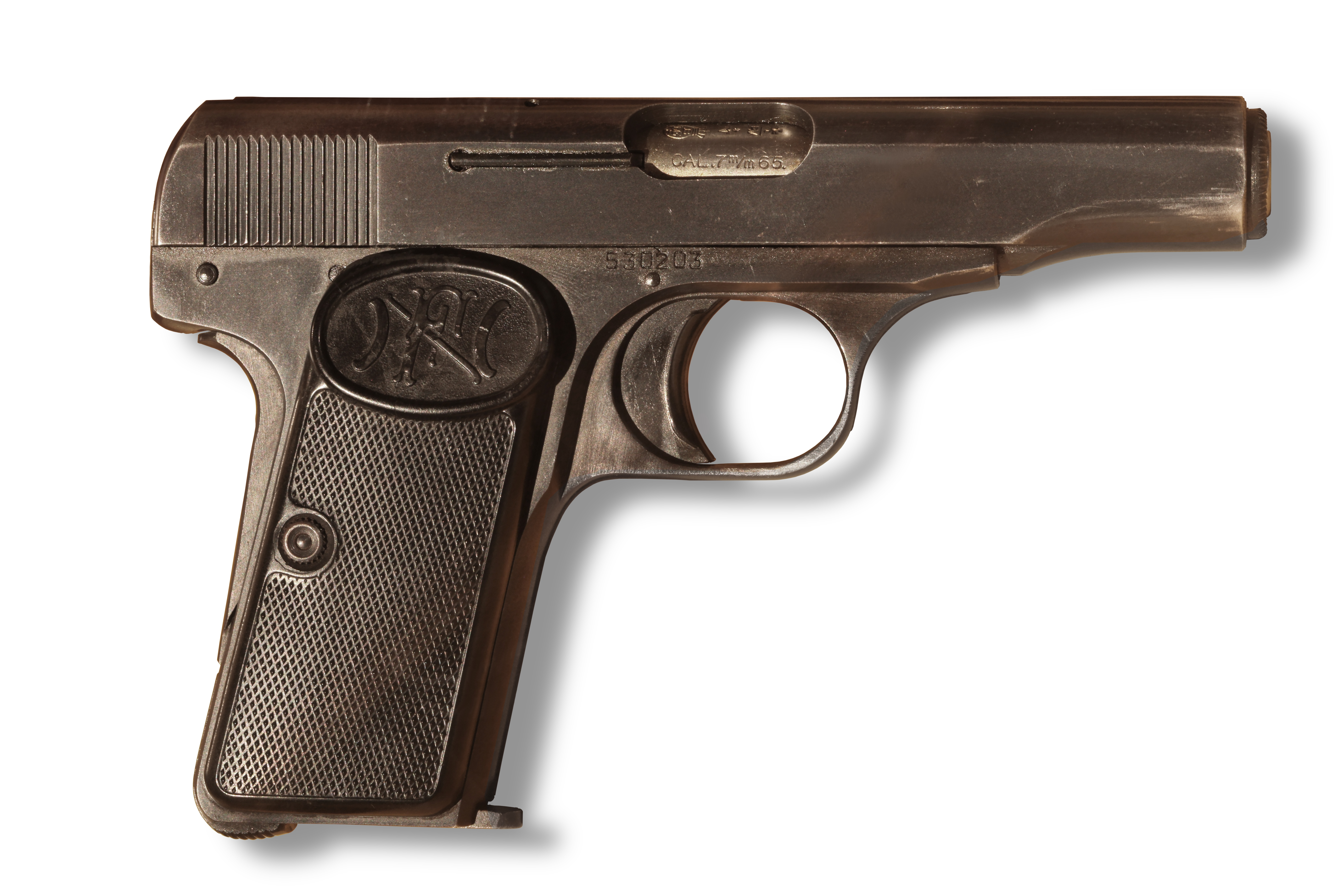
FN Model 1910 of the Gendarmerie of Vaud, on display at Morges castle museum

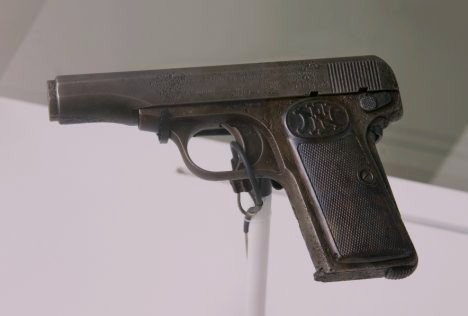
Gavrilo Princip's FN M1910, used to assassinate Archduke Franz Ferdinand of Austria in Sarajevo

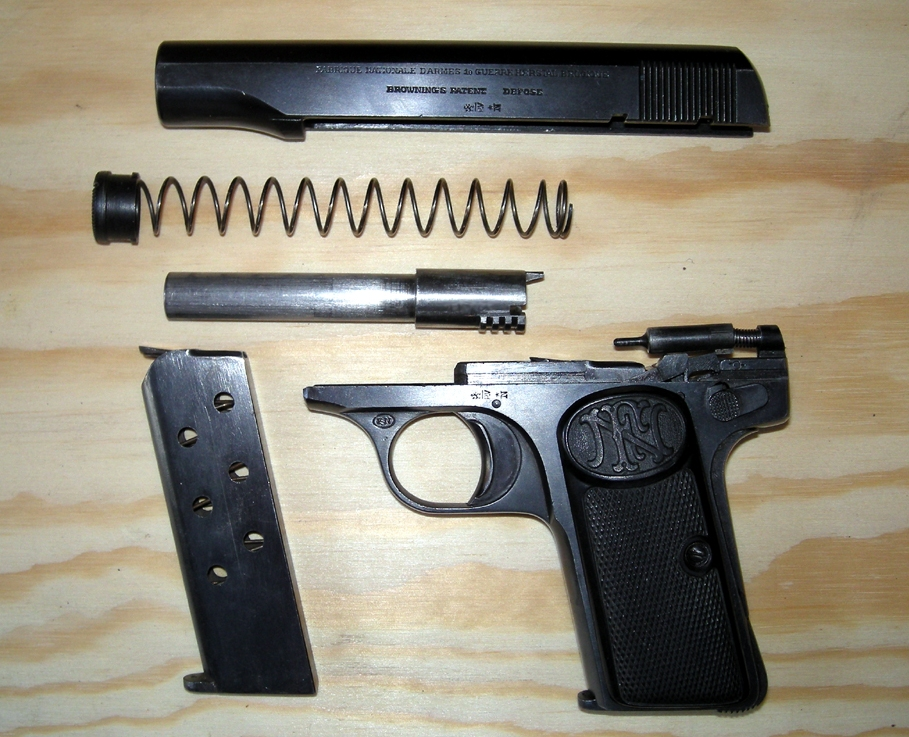
Browning M 1910 disassembled

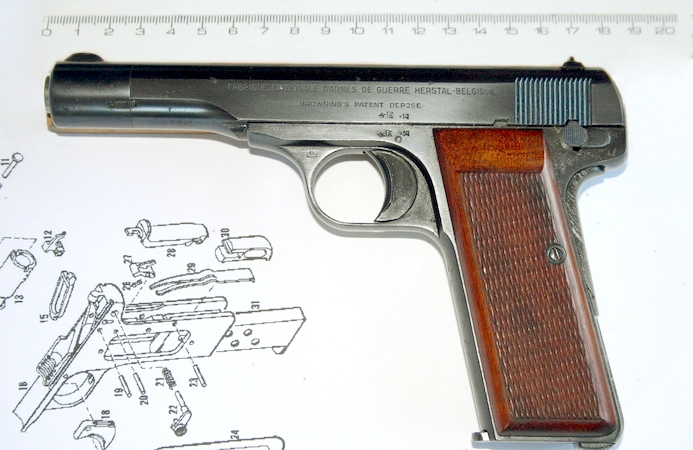
FN Model 1922 in 7.65mm

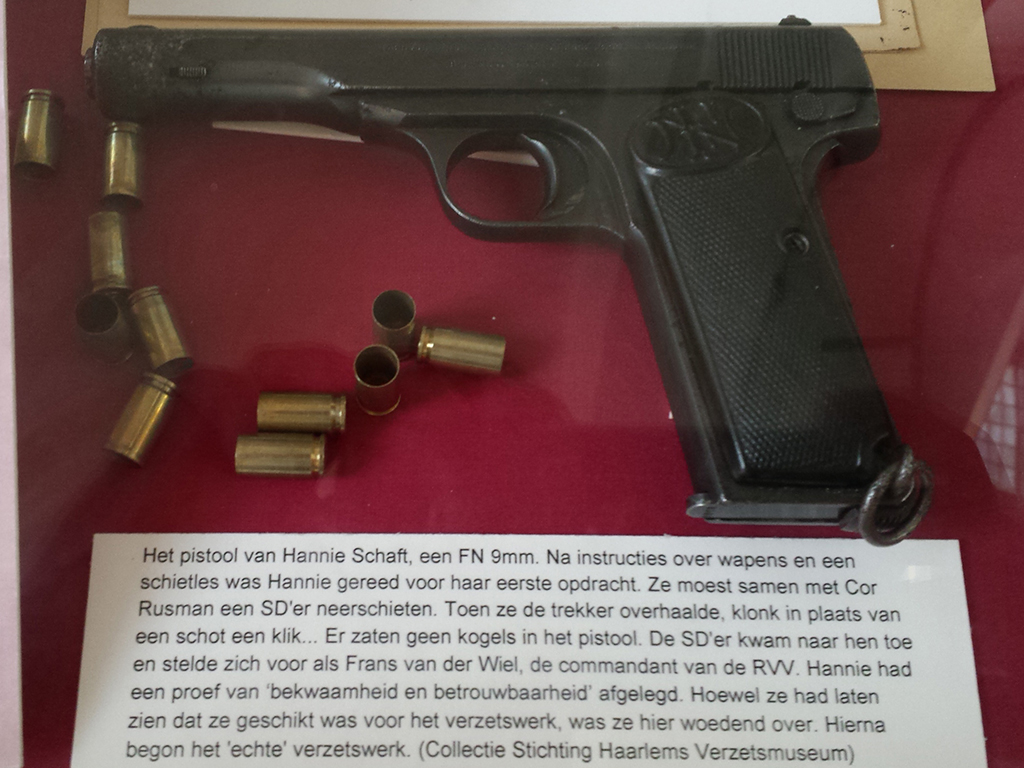
Pistol of Hannie Schaft, FN M1922

== General and cited references ==
- Modern Firearms - Handguns - Browning 1910, 1922 and 380
- Vojta, Jira T. in AutoMag, Volume XXXII, Issue 10, January 2000, pp. 231–233.
- Henrotin, Gerard. FN Browning pistols 1910 & 1922. HLebooks.com, 2006.
- Unblinking Eye - FN Model 1910
