= Frank A. Capell =

American author (1907–1980)

Francis Alphonse Capell
- Capell in c. 1960
- Born: May 8, 1907; Washington Heights; New York City, U.S.
- Died: October 18, 1980 (aged 73); New Brunswick, New Jersey, U.S.
- Occupations: Author; essayist; pamphleteer
- Spouse: Adele Irene Neighbor
- Parent(s): Anthony Capelli; Caroline Louisa Brantigam

Francis Alphonse Capell (May 8, 1907 – October 18, 1980) was an American writer and essayist. He was the publisher of the newsletter Herald of Freedom in Zarephath, New Jersey. He was one of the first writers to speculate on the Robert F. Kennedy and Marilyn Monroe trysts. Robert F. Kennedy, then the Attorney General, had Capell's telephone tapped.

== Biography ==
Francis Alphonse Capell was born on May 8, 1907, in Washington Heights in New York City to Anthony Capelli and Caroline Louisa Brantigam. He married in 1935 and had one daughter. He remarried in 1948 to Adele Irene Neighbor and they raised seven sons. He founded The Capell Employment Agency, which had five offices in New York City. In 1943, while an investigator for the War Production Board, Capell was sentenced to two years of probation and fined $2,000 for "agreeing to take a $1,000 gratuity from a clothing manufacturer."

In 1964, when Thomas Kuchel was campaigning against Barry Goldwater, there circulated a "vicious document" that purported to be an affidavit signed by a Los Angeles Police Department officer saying that in 1949 he had arrested Kuchel. The document said the arrest was for drunkenness while Kuchel had been in the midst of a sex act. Capell was indicted for the libel, along with Norman H. Krause, a bar owner and ex-Los Angeles policeman, who in 1950 did arrest two people who worked in Kuchel's office for drunkenness: Jack Clemmons, a Los Angeles police sergeant until his resignation two weeks before his arrest; and John F. Fergus, a public relations man for Eversharp, Inc., who was charged in 1947 with possession of a concealed weapon and given a suspended sentence.

A lifelong heavy smoker, Capell died from lung cancer on October 18, 1980, in New Brunswick, New Jersey. He was buried in Somerset Hills Cemetery in Basking Ridge, New Jersey.

== Selected publications ==
=== Books ===
- The Threat from Within: The Truth about the Conspiracy to Destroy America (1963). Zarephath, New Jersey: Herald of Freedom. 51 pages.

"The American people have the finest country In the world. This has been made possible only because of God's blessing."

- Treason is the Reason (1965). Zarephath, New Jersey: Herald of Freedom. 168 pages.
- The Strange Case of Jacob Javits (1966). Zarephath, New Jersey: Herald of Freedom. 71 pages.
- LSD — Weapon of Subversion (1968). Zarephath, New Jersey: Herald of Freedom.
- The Untouchables (1968). Zarephath, New Jersey: Herald of Freedom.
- The Untouchables, Part 2 (1969). Zarephath, New Jersey: Herald of Freedom.
- The Strange Death of Marilyn Monroe (1969). Zarephath, New Jersey: Herald of Freedom. 79 pages.

Argues that Monroe was killed by Communists. The original exposé of her trysts with Robert F. Kennedy.

- The Decline of Catholicism (1972). Zarephath, New Jersey: Herald of Freedom.
- Henry Kissinger: Soviet Agent (1974). Zarephath, New Jersey: Herald of Freedom. 120 pages.

=== Pamphlets ===
- Atheism (1966). St. Louis: Christian Nationalist Crusade.
- Massacre Propaganda (1970). St. Louis: Christian Nationalist Crusade. 7 pages.
- Robert F. Kennedy: A Political Biography, 1925–1968 (1968). Zarephath, New Jersey: Herald of Freedom. 19 pages.

Also published as Robert F. Kennedy: Emerging American Dictator.

- Black Revolution Progress Report. St. Louis: Christian Nationalist Crusade. 7 pages.

=== Newsletters ===
- Herald of Freedom (biweekly).

Sold for $10/year for the standard edition, and $6/year for the religious edition, in 1970.
