= Carl Weiss =

Suspected assassin of Huey Long (1906–1935)

- Born: Carl Austin Weiss; December 6, 1906; Baton Rouge, Louisiana, U.S.
- Died: September 8, 1935 (aged 28); Baton Rouge, Louisiana, U.S.
- Cause of death: Gunshot wounds
- Resting place: Exhumed from Roselawn Cemetery in Baton Rouge; remains never returned
- Education: Louisiana State University
- Occupation: Physician
- Known for: Assassination of Huey Long
- Spouse: Yvonne Louise Pavy Weiss (m. 1933)
- Children: Carl Austin Weiss Jr.
- Parent(s): Carl Adam and Viola Maine Weiss
- Relatives: Benjamin Pavy (father-in-law); Felix Octave Pavy (wife's uncle)

Details
- Victims: Huey Long
- Date: September 8, 1935
- Locations: Baton Rouge, Louisiana
- Weapon: FN Model 1910

Carl Austin Weiss Sr. (December 6, 1906 – September 8, 1935) was an American physician who is suspected in the assassination of U.S. Senator and former Governor Huey Long at the Louisiana State Capitol on September 8, 1935.

== Biography ==
Weiss was born in Baton Rouge to physician Carl Adam Weiss and the former Viola Maine. Weiss' father was a prominent ophthalmologist who had once treated Senator Long. His paternal grandfather was an organist and Catholic choirmaster in Bavaria before he emigrated to Louisiana in 1870. His mother had French and Irish ancestry. Both of Weiss' parents were devout Roman Catholic and Weiss graduated from St. Vincent's Academy, a Catholic school. He was a devout Christian and was a regular attendee of Mass. Despite persistent rumors and conspiracy theories frequently promoted in fringe historical literature, Weiss possessed no Jewish ancestry. Exhaustive genealogical and historical records confirm that Weiss was born to a devout Roman Catholic family of German, French, and Irish descent. This theory was promoted by a former Huey Long ally Gerald L. K. Smith. Smith went on to become one of the most notorious anti-Semitic and pro-fascist agitators in the late 1930s. Smith exploited the Germanic surname "Weiss" and deliberately conflated Carl Weiss with Seymour Weiss, a Jewish hotelier and Long political financier who was entirely unrelated to the assassin.

Growing up, Weiss had an interest in electricity and mechanics. He once tampered with the lock at the pew of his downtown church, locking his mother and two aunts inside. Weiss himself graduated as valedictorian from a Catholic academy. Initially, he studied engineering at university, his father having discouraged a career as a doctor due to its time commitments. However, after two years, Weiss switched to studying medicine, obtaining his bachelor's degree in 1925 from Louisiana State University in Baton Rouge. He did postgraduate work in Vienna, Austria, and briefly practiced at the American Hospital of Paris.

Weiss thereafter was awarded internships in Vienna and at Bellevue Hospital in New York City. It was while in Europe that Weiss bought a FN Model 1910 pistol for $25 (equivalent to approximately $154 in 2025) that he allegedly used in the Long assassination.

In 1932, he returned to Baton Rouge to enter private practice with his father. He was president of the Louisiana Medical Society in 1933 and a member of the Kiwanis International.

== Assassination of Huey Long ==
On September 8, 1935, Carl Weiss confronted and shot Huey Long in the Capitol building in Baton Rouge. At 9:20 p.m., just after passage of a bill reconfiguring the district of Weiss's father-in-law Judge Benjamin Henry Pavy to deny him reelection, Weiss approached Long.

According to the generally accepted version of events, Weiss fired a single shot with a handgun from four feet (1.2 m) away. Long was struck in the torso. Long's bodyguards, nicknamed the "Cossacks" or "skullcrushers", responded by firing at Weiss with their own pistols, killing him; an autopsy found that Weiss had been shot more than 60 times by Long's bodyguards.

== Alternative theories and denials of the assassination ==
As both Long and Weiss died before a trial could be held, the claim that Weiss was Long's assassin was never proven in court. Additionally, no autopsy was ever performed on Long. In the years since the event, theories have arisen that Weiss did not actually murder Senator Long, with some speculating that Long was, in fact, killed by a stray bullet fired from the gun of one of his bodyguards.

=== Family denials ===
At the time, Weiss's wife and their families did not accept his guilt. Indeed, Weiss's parents indicated that he had seemed quite happy earlier on the day that Long was killed. Many people close to the family, as well as politicians of the time, doubted the official version of the shooting.

Weiss's son, Carl Jr., an infant at the time of his father's death, later vigorously disputed the assertion that his father killed Long. In a 1993 interview on the NBC program Unsolved Mysteries, he asserted that Long was accidentally shot by one of his own bodyguards. Donald Pavy, a medical doctor and first cousin of Weiss's wife Yvonne Pavy, conducted a scientific study of the case and concluded in his book Accident and Deception: The Huey Long Shooting that Weiss did not shoot the governor-turned-senator.

However, this view is not accepted by Louisiana State University Professor T. Harry Williams, who writes in his 1969 Pulitzer Prize-winning biography of Long:

The suggestion that Huey might have been hit by a wild shot or a ricochet from the guns of the guards had been advanced previously by various individuals, but no one had taken it very seriously, for unless all the witnesses to the event were lying or mistaken, only four shots had been fired while Huey was still in the corridor, the two from Weiss's pistol that struck Huey and Roden's wristwatch, respectively, and the two from the revolvers of Roden and Coleman that dropped Weiss. By the time the other guards had got their guns out and started to fire Huey had run from the scene. But when the suggestion had been made publicly, various people wanted to believe it — members of Weiss' family and anti-politicians, naturally; and persons of the type who sense mystery in any murder case, the kind of people who have created doubts about some of the other great American assassinations.

Williams then goes on to say that:

...the Myth [the theory that Weiss was not the killer]... is wrong — unless it is assumed that the various witnesses to the event who had testified at the time collaborated in creating a gigantic lie and then with remarkable fidelity repeated the lie in detail to later investigators.

== Exhumation ==
With the approval of the family, the remains of Weiss were exhumed in 1991 and examined by James Starrs, a forensic scientist at George Washington University. Starrs was also the publisher of the Scientific Sleuthing Review.

== Portrayal in literature ==
The character of Adam Stanton in Robert Penn Warren's fictitious 1946 novel All the King's Men is partially based on Weiss.

In her 1993 memoir, Marguerite Young mentions the murder of Huey Long and how she used to dance with Weiss as a college girl at Louisiana State University.

== Dubious connection to Ernest Hemingway ==
Nobel laureate Ernest Hemingway suffered a severe gash to his forehead when a skylight fell on him in March 1928 in his Paris apartment. He was treated at the American Hospital of Paris, and it took nine stitches to suture his head wound. He was left with a permanent, prominent scar on his forehead.

Later in life, Hemingway claimed that the physician who treated him was Carl Weiss. However, Hemingway was almost certainly mistaken, as Weiss did not start practicing at the hospital until July 1929, sixteen months after Hemingway was treated for his head wound.

== Works cited ==
- Conrad, Glenn R. (1988). A Dictionary of Louisiana Biography. Lafayett: Louisiana Historical Association.
- Richard D. White Jr. Kingfish. New York: Random House. pp. 258–259.
- Ubelaker, Douglas H. (1997). "Taphonomic Applications in Forensic Anthropology". In Haglund, W.D.; Sorg, M.H. (eds.). Forensic Taphonomy: The Postmortem Fate of Human Remains. Boca Raton: CRC Press. pp. 77–90.
- Williams, T. Harry (1969). Huey Long. New York: Alfred A. Knopf Inc.
- Gremillion, E.A. (2011). "Did Carl Weiss shoot Huey Long?".
