= The Roosevelt New Orleans =

Hotel in New Orleans, Louisiana, US

Coordinates: 29.9539°N 90.0716°W

The Roosevelt New Orleans, A Waldorf Astoria Hotel
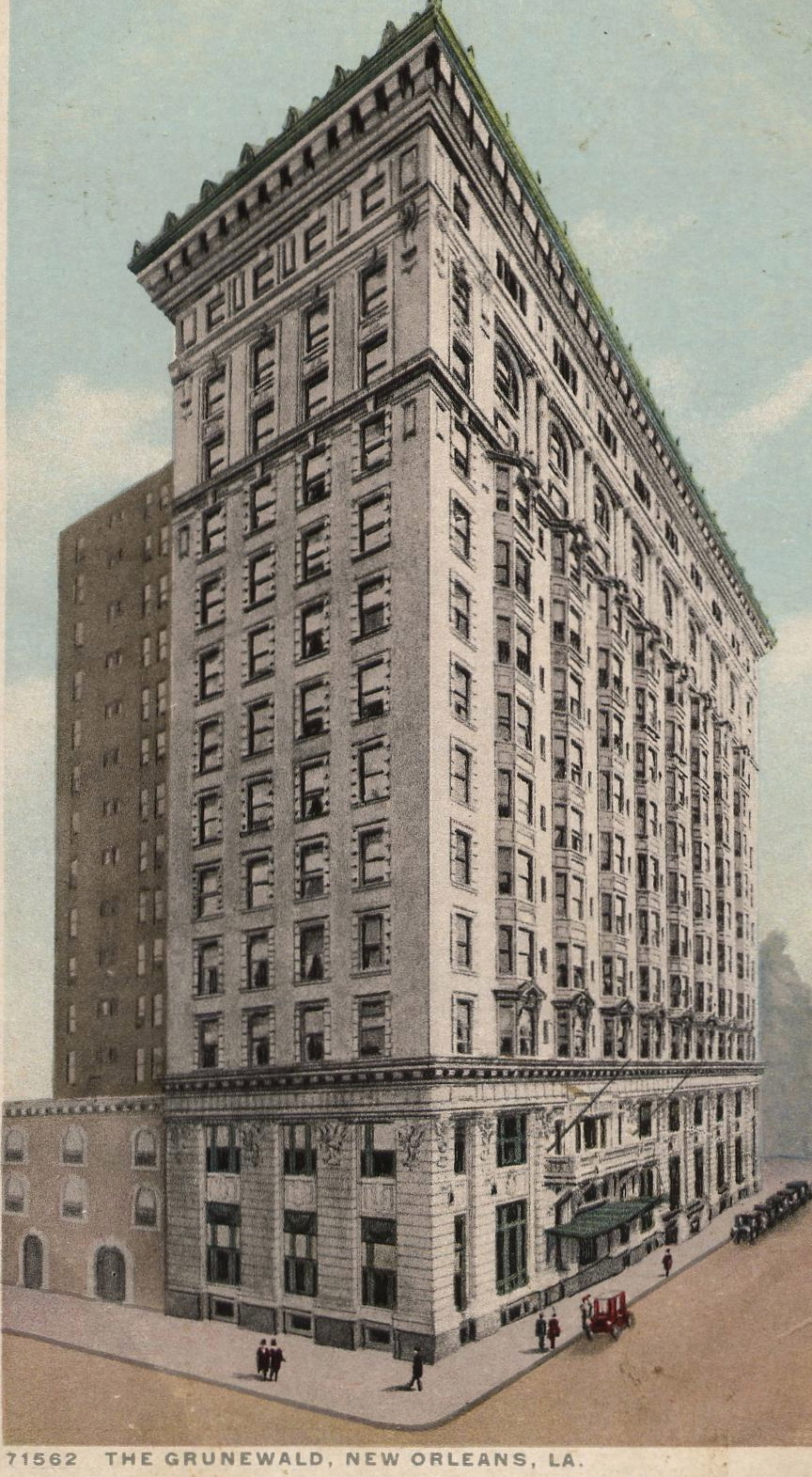
- Circa 1910s
- Hotel chain: Waldorf Astoria

General information
- Location: New Orleans, Louisiana, 130 Roosevelt Way, New Orleans, LA 70112
- Opening: 1893
- Owner: First Class Hotels
- Operator: Hilton Worldwide

Height
- Height: 211 ft (64 m)

Technical details
- Floor count: 14

Design and construction
- Architects: 1893: Armand Koch; 1900: Toledano & Wogan
- Developer: Louis Grunewald

Other information
- Number of rooms: 504
- Number of suites: 125
- Number of restaurants: 3
- Parking: Valet

Website
- The Roosevelt New Orleans website

The Roosevelt New Orleans in New Orleans, Louisiana, is a 504-room hotel managed by Waldorf Astoria Hotels & Resorts. The hotel was originally built by Louis Grunewald, a German immigrant, and opened in 1893 as "The Hotel Grunewald."

== History ==
=== Hotel Grunewald ===
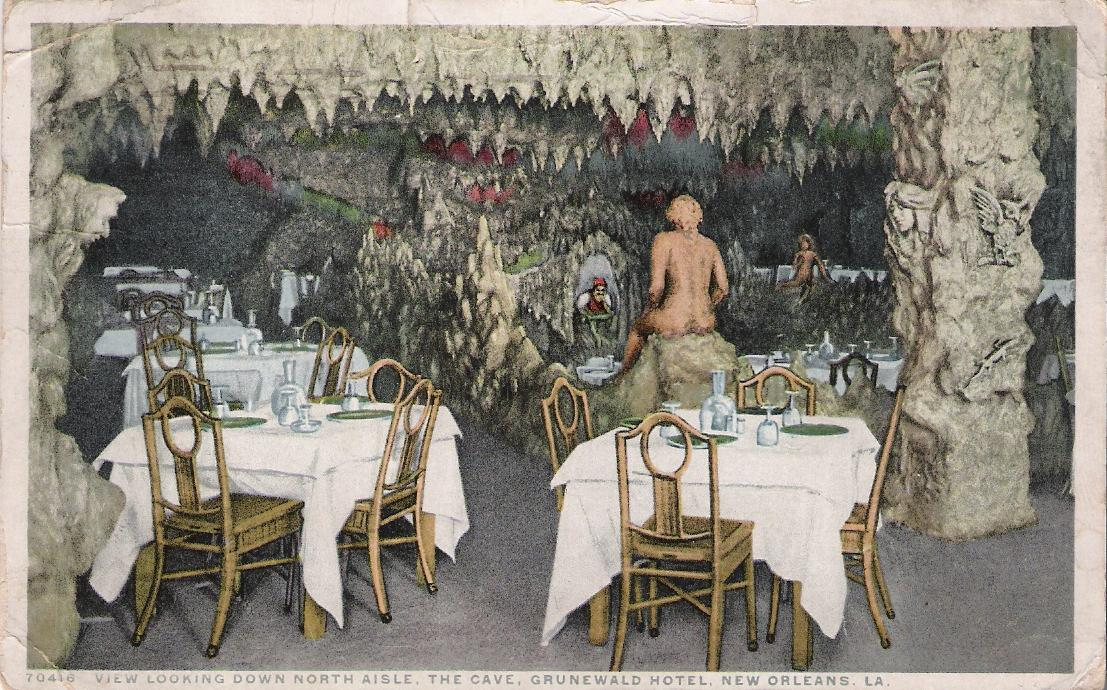
A postcard of The Cave in the Grunewald Hotel circa 1908

The original Hotel Grunewald building was six stories tall and faced Baronne Street, encompassing street numbers 123 through 135. It was built after Grunewald's Music Hall was destroyed by fire in 1862. The 200-room hotel, designed by Milwaukee architect Armand Koch, opened in December 1893, in order to be ready for the 1894 New Orleans Mardi Gras season. The decision to build a hotel proved to be very sound, as the other major hotel in the city, the St. Charles Hotel, was destroyed by fire soon after the Grunewald opened.

=== Grunewald Annex ===
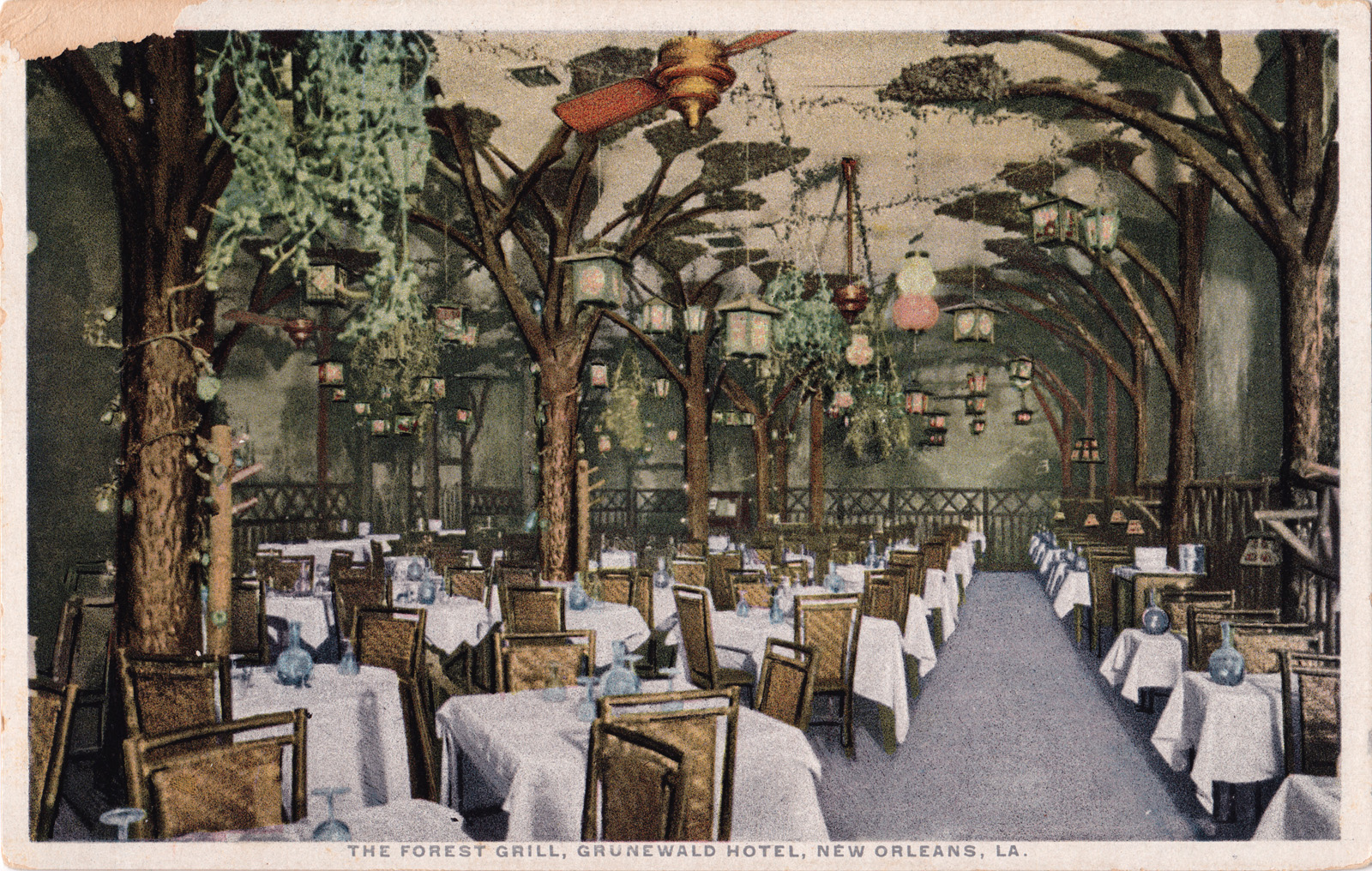
The Forest Grill at the Hotel Grunewald

As early as 1900, Grunewald began plans and eventually construction of an 'Annex' tower on the University Place side of the block. The cost of the new tower was reportedly $2.5 million and was considered one of the finest in the country. The new tower was 14 stories tall and had 400 rooms. Its grand opening was at Midnight, January 1, 1908. This expansion was designed by the architectural firm, Toledano & Wogan. Louis Grunewald's son Theodore became the Director and Manager of the hotel. The lobby of the Annex featured a large Italian Marble staircase which reached an overlooking mezzanine level of the hotel. The Annex Tower allowed the addition of several entertainment and dining facilities. Among the new options were the Forest Grill, The Lounge, The Fountain Grill and the most famous, The Cave. The Cave was designed to mimic a cavern complete with waterfalls, stalactites, glass topped tables and statues of gnomes and nymphs. Revues similar to the Ziegfeld Follies were presented on a nightly basis.

In 1915, Theodore Grunewald became the sole owner of the hotel, when his father died. He retained ownership of the hotel until early 1923 when, on his doctor's advice, he sold all of his business interests.

=== The first Roosevelt era ===
In 1923, Theodore Grunewald sold the hotel to a business group headed by Joseph, Felix, and Luca Vacarro. Immediately after the purchase the new owners put forth plans to tear down the original hotel building, build a new tower the same height as the Annex, and redesign the interior of the Annex. The Vacarro group spent $500,000 on the redesign alone, mainly redecorating and updating designs. The hotel was officially renamed The Roosevelt Hotel on October 31, 1923, in honor of President Theodore Roosevelt, whose efforts building the Panama Canal had been tremendous for the city of New Orleans, financially. A ceremony was held in the Romanesque Room (now known as the Blue Room) to commemorate the name change.

On October 1, 1925, the new Baronne Street tower was opened. It was 16 stories tall and once again gave the hotel space to add even more amenities. The new tower added a barber shop, a coffee shop, and stores which faced the street. By the end of 1925, the Romanesque Room became the Venetian Room and was known as a premiere jazz venue. The hotel began a tradition of decorating its block-long lobby for Christmas. The tradition continues to this day and has become a local icon of the holiday season.

In 1933, the hotel was operated by Niagara Falls businessman Frank A. Dudley and the United Hotels Company. until a group named the New Orleans Roosevelt Corporation began an effort to acquire the hotel from the Vacarro Group. The group was headed by Seymour Weiss who had started his career at the hotel as the barber shop manager. He was later promoted to the Head of Publicity and Conventions, Associate Manager, Assistant Manager, and eventually General Manager of the hotel. In 1931, he became the Vice President and managing director. The sale of the hotel to Weiss's group was finalized on December 12, 1934.

After the purchase by Weiss, major changes and upgrades began throughout the hotel. The marble staircase in the lobby was removed and a ceiling was installed. This allowed the hotel to create more meeting space on the mezzanine level. The Grand Ballroom that was created at this was the largest meeting room in the city. All of the hotel's guest rooms were completely refurbished, and the Tip Top Club on the 12th floor was converted into guest suites. The Venetian Room was closed and remodeled. On December 31, 1935, the Blue Room opened and was, for decades, the premiere music venue in the city. The performers in the earlier years of the Blue Room included Glenn Miller, Tommy Dorsey, Sammy Kaye, and Guy Lombardo. On August 1, 1938, the Main Bar (now named the Sazerac Bar) opened. Its mahogany bar, walnut-paneled walls, and Paul Ninas murals are still a focal point of the hotel. On September 1, 1938, the Fountain Lounge opened.

Weiss was a confidant of Louisiana Governor and later U.S. Senator Huey P. Long. During the 1930s, when he was a U.S. Senator, Long used a 12th-floor suite at the hotel as his Louisiana headquarters and effective New Orleans residence. He was known to imbibe Ramos gin fizzes and even had Sam Guarino, the head bartender, flown up to the New Yorker Hotel in New York City to teach the staff how to make them. His 'Deduct Box' was believed to be kept at the hotel. The 'Deduct Box' was where Long held all of the "contributions" from state employees and supporters. The box has never been found; a replica now stands in the lobby.

In 1949, Weiss purchased the rights to use the name "Sazerac Bar" from the Sazerac Company. The bar had previously been on Exchange Place before Prohibition and at 300 Carondelet Street afterward. He renovated a store front on Baronne Street which had previously held a wine-and-spirits store and opened the Sazerac Bar on September 26, 1949. As a sign of his marketing genius, Weiss announced through the news media that the new bar would abolish the previous 'men-only' house rule and admit women. Women from around the city flocked to the venue, and the event became known as Storming the Sazerac. The anniversary is celebrated every year at the hotel with vintage costumes and libations.

In 1954, the Shell Building was completed on Common Street, and Weiss negotiated to lease seven floors. The addition of this space allowed the hotel to increase to 900 rooms and to build the International Room, which could accommodate as many as 2,200 guests for one event. The International Room connected on the second floor with the other meeting rooms on the mezzanine level. With the increase in meeting space, a brand new banquet kitchen was built in 1955 on the same level. The kitchen to this day services all meetings and events in the hotel.

In 1959, the decision was made to close the Sazerac Bar on Baronne Street and transfer the name to the Main Bar. It is still named the Sazerac Bar today.

In 1964 Arthur Hailey resided at the hotel for two months. He went on to use it as the basis for his best selling novel Hotel (1965).

As Weiss grew older, he sought out a buyer for the hotel. The Swig family, owners of the Fairmont San Francisco became the new owners in 1965.

=== The Fairmont New Orleans ===
The Roosevelt was acquired by Benjamin and Richard Swig on November 19, 1965. In an effort to ease the transition, the Swigs first changed the name to the Fairmont Roosevelt Hotel and then eventually to the Fairmont Hotel New Orleans. The Swigs began to modernize the hotel over the years. The initial renovations cost $1.5 million and were mainly in the look and design of the hotel. Updates to the Blue Room, both entrances and Dining Rooms were made. Carpet was added in the lobby. The Fountain Lounge was renamed the Rendezvous Lounge.

In the following years the Rendezvous Lounge was closed and renovated. The space was renamed the Sazerac Restaurant to tie it in with the bar. The restaurant featured waiters in black tie and tableside preparations. The Sazerac Bar was updated with carpeting and modern furniture and new lighting. One of the store fronts on Baronne Street that originally housed the coffee shop became Bailey's. Bailey's was the hotel's casual dining room and was open 24 hours a day. The restaurant had the unique reputation of having quality upscale food at any hour of the night. It was very popular with its proximity to the theaters in the city. Another extensive renovation occurred in the late 1990s with all of the guest rooms being renovated.

The Fairmont Hotel hosted a casting call for the Disney Channel’s Mickey Mouse Club series in 1989.

The Fairmont New Orleans was damaged during Hurricane Katrina August, 2005 and closed indefinitely. While some repair work was done, work was suspended in an incomplete state in March 2007 after preliminary estimates of the damage were revealed to have been greatly underestimated.

=== The second Roosevelt era ===
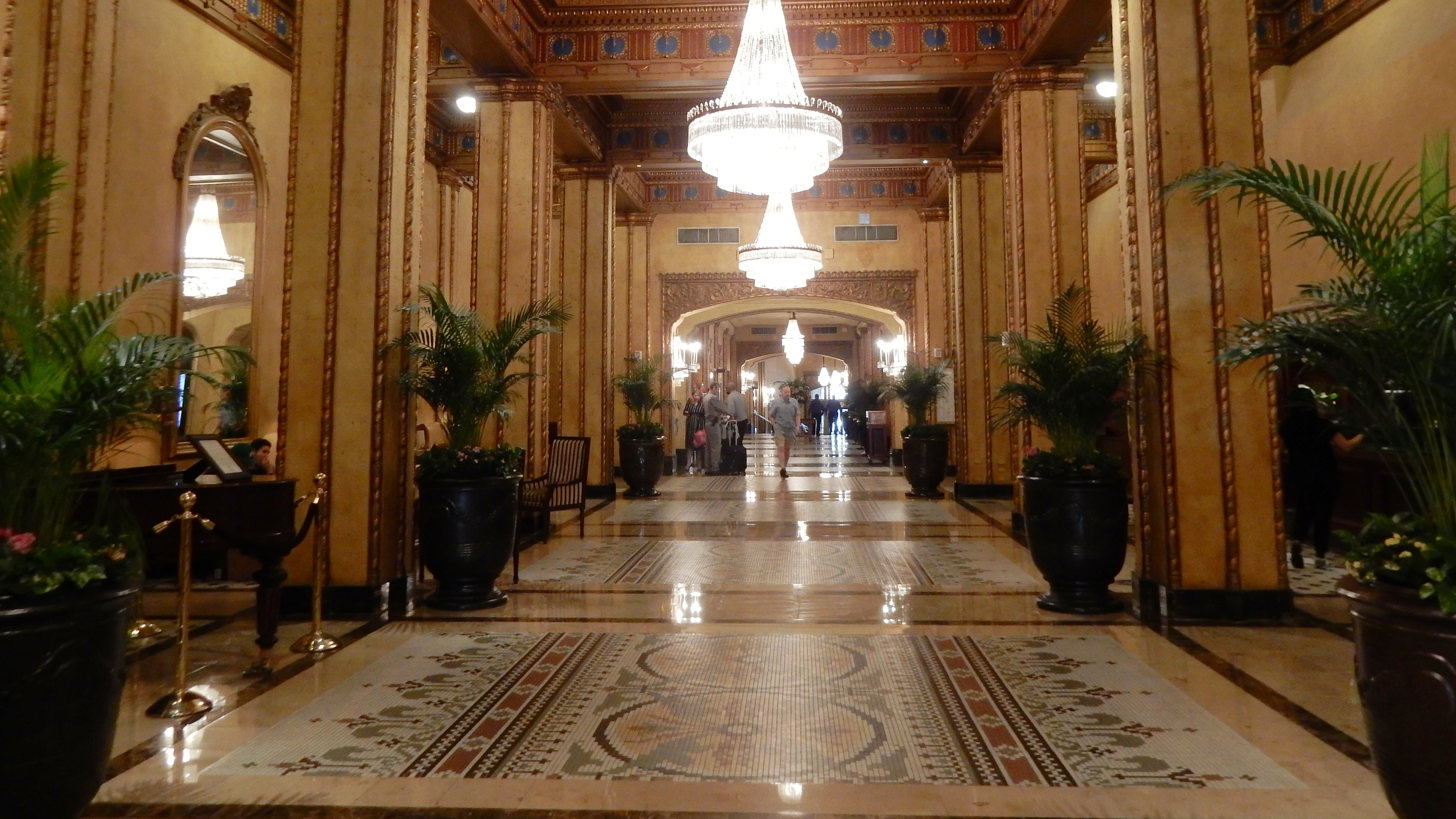
The lobby of the Roosevelt New Orleans

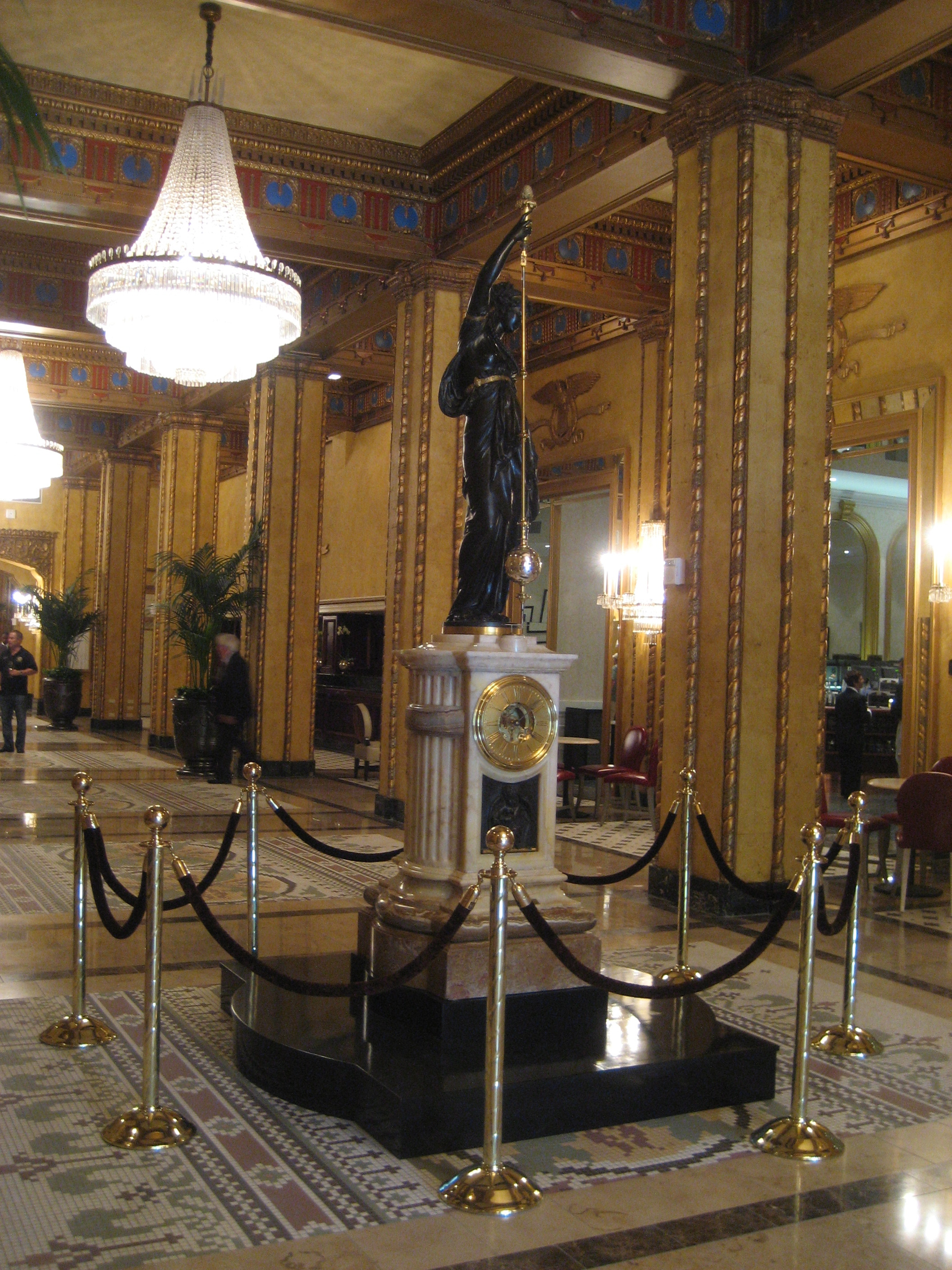
Monumental conical pendulum clock by Eugène Farcot, sculpture by Albert-Ernest Carrier-Belleuse, 1867. Acquired after the last renovation.

On August 24, 2007, Sam Friedman, a son of the late Louisiana State Senator Sylvan Friedman of Natchitoches Parish, of Dimension Development Company from Natchitoches, Louisiana, announced the purchase of the Fairmont by First Class Hotels for $17 million from the owners, Roosevelt Ventures, LLC. Also announced was the plan to spend $100 million to convert the hotel to one of Hilton's premium hotels in their Waldorf Astoria Collection chain.

The entire hotel was completely renovated with modern systems. The design of the hotel was a nod to the grand days of the hotel in the 1930s and 1940s. The lobby was restored to the look of that period. The carpeting in the lobby was removed and original floor was repaired. The Sazerac Bar was restored to its look of the 1940s. The space that housed Bailey's was renovated and now houses Domenica Restaurant. The other store front on Baronne Street was converted into the Roosevelt Emporium, the hotel's gift shop. The rooftop tennis courts that the Fairmont had were removed and a brand new pool deck was constructed with shower facilities, a bar and kitchen.

The new owners remodeled the hotel and selected Waldorf Astoria Hotels and Resorts to manage the property. The owners returned the hotel to the name it had from 1923 to 1965 and The Roosevelt Hotel reopened to the public at 3:00 PM on July 1, 2009, with a ribbon cutting in the main lobby by the ownership group represented by Alan Rose, Sam Friedman, Jack Guenther, Neil Freeman, and Lod Cook.

The current hotel holds 504 guest rooms of which 125 are suites. The total meeting space is over 68,000 square feet (6,300 m^{2}) with multiple rooms across three floors of the hotel.

The Roosevelt underwent a renovation to each of its 23 ballrooms and meeting spaces in 2018, and a renovation of the rooftop pool and guest rooms in 2019.

== See also ==
- List of tallest buildings in New Orleans
- List of tallest buildings in Louisiana
