= Seymour Weiss =

American politician (1896–1969)

- Born: September 13, 1896; Bunkie, Avoyelles Parish; Louisiana, USA
- Died: September 17, 1969 (aged 73); Baton Rouge, Louisiana
- Resting place: Metairie Cemetery in New Orleans
- Education: Public schools
- Occupations: Hotel executive Confidant of Huey Pierce Long, Jr.
- Spouse(s): (1) Notie "Fay" Turner Weiss (killed in automobile accident); Elva Mae Lavies Kimball Weiss (married 1963-1969, his death)
- Children: No children S. J. Weiss (nephew) Seymour Weiss, II (nephew)
- Parent(s): Samuel and Gisella Elias Weiss

Seymour Weiss (September 13, 1896 – September 17, 1969) was a prominent hotel executive and civic leader from New Orleans, Louisiana, who was a close confidant of the legendary Huey Pierce Long, Jr. Weiss, the most loyal of the Longites, bore the same last name as the apparent Long assassin, Carl Weiss, M.D.

== Background ==
Weiss was born in Bunkie in Avoyelles Parish and died in the capital city of Baton Rouge. His parents were Samuel Weiss, originally from Austria-Hungary and a merchant, and the former Gisella Elias, of Berlin, Germany. Seymour had three brothers: Bernard, Milton, and Julius. On January 10, 1954, Bernard and Milton died in a private airplane crash, along with Thomas Elmer Braniff, the owner of the airline, and a number of other civic leaders from Shreveport, Louisiana, and Dallas, Texas. The men had been on a private hunting trip to South Texas and South Louisiana; the plane crashed in a freak ice storm. Weiss' last brother, Julius, died later the same year on August 30, 1954, of personal health issues. Seymour was educated in public schools in Bunkie and Abbeville in Vermilion Parish. For a time he was a department store clerk in Alexandria in Rapides Parish and the largest city in Central Louisiana. He moved to New Orleans in 1916 to clerk in a shoe store. After the United States' entry into World War I, Weiss attended officers' training at Camp Gordon, Georgia, but the conflict ended before Weiss finished his training. Thereafter, he returned to New Orleans to resume work as a shoe clerk.

Seymour was married twice: on April 19, 1925, to Notie "Fay" Turner, and then on June 12, 1963, to Elva Mae Lavie Kimball, whom he predeceased. He died in Baton Rouge and is interred at the family plot at Metairie Cemetery in New Orleans. (Plot: Sec. 34, Lot 19).

== The Roosevelt Hotel ==
In 1923, Weiss became the manager of a barbershop at the Grunewald Hotel in New Orleans. In 1924, he became the assistant hotel manager, and in 1928, he was promoted to hotel manager. First built in 1893, and known as the "Grunewald" (for its original owner, Louis Grunewald), the Grunewald opened what has been called the first nightclub in the United States, a basement room decorated with fake stalactites called "The Cave", where one could watch dancing chorus girls and listen to Dixieland jazz that would easily drown out the soothing indoor waterfalls. In 1923, a consortium of local investors purchased the hotel and renamed it "The Roosevelt" in honor of President Theodore Roosevelt, who had died four years earlier.

In 1931, Weiss was named president of the New Orleans Roosevelt Corp. From 1931–1965, he was the principal owner and managing director of the Roosevelt. The Cave was closed in favor of a larger venue a floor above called "The Blue Room" which became a nationally prominent music venue. Weiss sold the Roosevelt in 1965. It became the Fairmont Hotel until closing following Hurricane Katrina. In August 2007, Dimension Development Company, Inc, a Natchitoches, Louisiana-based hotel development and management company purchased the property, and restored the building with a scheduled opening date of June 25, 2009. Dimension Development Company Inc, entered into an agreement with Hilton Worldwide to brand the hotel under Hilton's premier Waldorf Astoria collection. The hotel has been rechristened The Roosevelt Hotel by Waldorf Astoria. A grand opening was held in 2009. Businessman Sam Friedman of Natchitoches was heavily involved in the reopening. He is the son of the late Louisiana State Senator Sylvan Friedman.

== Loyal to Huey Long ==
Weiss became a political booster of Huey Long, whom he met during the 1928 gubernatorial campaign. Weiss acted as Long's chief of protocol and resolved an unwitting comical dispute that developed when the governor received a German delegation at Mardi Gras in 1930 in a pair of pajamas, a red and blue robe, and blue bedroom slippers.

Long made Weiss's Roosevelt Hotel his New Orleans headquarters. It was said that Weiss made sure Long never got lost in the hallways of the large facility. Weiss was the closest of friends and a regular golfing partner with Long. He was easily considered an "insider at Long's right hand." Weiss was present at the bedside of Long when he died from internal infection contracted during the attempt to remove the bullets in the assassination attempt.

Weiss became treasurer of both the Louisiana Democratic Association and Long's secret political fund. During the Great Depression, Weiss had control of federal relief funds in Louisiana. He was vice-president of the Win or Lose Corporation, a controversial oil company whose structure was devised by Huey Long. On Long's death, Weiss chaired the Huey P. Long Memorial Commission and remained active in the Long machine until scandals swept through the organization.

== Imprisonment for tax evasion ==
In 1934, Weiss was indicted by a federal grand jury in New Orleans on tax evasion charges. He paid back taxes after the charges were dropped. He was indicted again on tax evasion and mail fraud charges growing out of the "Louisiana Scandals" of the late 1930s. He was convicted and imprisoned for sixteen months between 1940 and 1942, before he was paroled and ordered to pay back taxes. In 1947, he was given a full and unconditional pardon by Democratic U.S. President Harry Truman.

== Weiss as civic leader ==
Weiss was a member of the New Orleans Zoning Board and commissioner of the municipal fire and police departments between 1932 and 1936. He was also president of the board of commissioners of the Port of New Orleans from 1933–1938.

He was active in the American Hotel Association and was president of the Louisiana Hotel-Motel and the New Orleans Hotel associations. He won statewide awards for hotel management in 1952 and 1957. He was a director of the New Orleans chapter of the American Red Cross, the Chamber of Commerce, and the International Trade Mart. In 1968, Weiss chaired the committee for the 250th anniversary of the founding of New Orleans.

Weiss was a member of the anti-communist organization the Information Council of the Americas.

== "Seymour Weiss" appears in these books ==
- at least 25 references in Huey Long Invades New Orleans: The Siege of a City, 1934–36 by Garry Boulard (Author)
- at least 25 references in Huey Long (Vintage) by T. Harry Williams (Author)
- at least 25 references in Louisiana Hayride by Harnett Kane (Author)
- 4 references in Deep Politics And The Death of JFK by Peter Dale Scott (Author)
- 4 references in The Wizards of Armageddon (Stanford Nuclear Age Series) by Fred M. Kaplan (Author)
- 4 references in Those Swinging Years: The Autobiography of Charlie Barnet by Charlie Barnet (Author), Stanley Dance (Author)
- 3 references in The Wonderful Era of the Great Dance Bands (A Da Capo Paperback) by Leo Walker
- 3 references in Gerald L. K. Smith: Minister of Hate by Glen Jeansonne
- 2 references in Myself Among Others by George Wein (Author)

A listing of collected artifacts from the estate of Seymour Weiss, donated by his second wife, Elva Weiss, can be found in the Louisiana State University Collection of "The Seymour Weiss Papers" Inventoried & Compiled by Sunny Stein, the Louisiana and Lower Mississippi Valley Collections, the Special Collections, Hill Memorial Library, and the Louisiana State University Libraries at Baton Rouge, Louisiana in the fall of 1999. A listing of contents may be viewed at: https://web.archive.org/web/20060902085923/http://www.lib.lsu.edu/special/findaid/s4165.html

== See also ==
- List of people pardoned or granted clemency by the president of the United States
