= Lee Man-hee =

South Korean cult leader (born 1931)

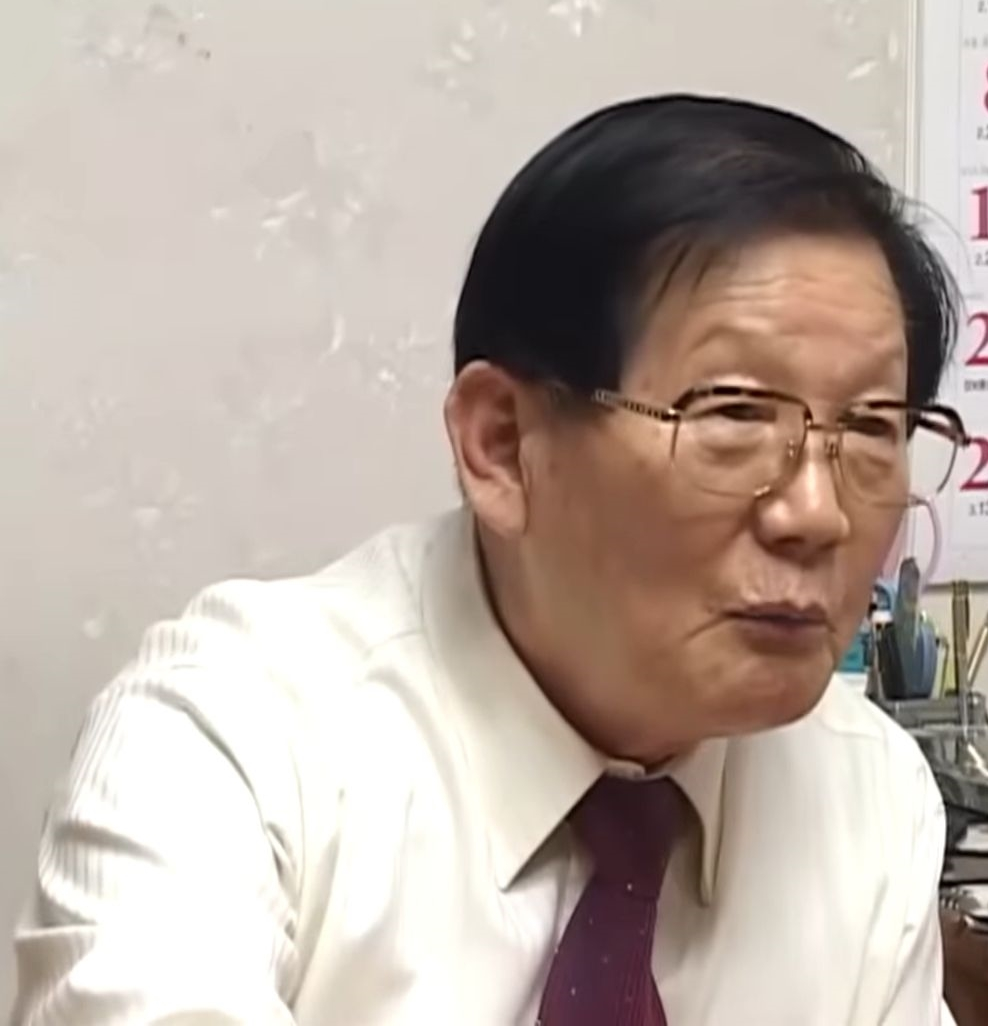
- Born: 15 September 1931 (age 95); Cheongdo, North Gyeongsang Province, Japanese Korea
- Occupation: Cult leader

Korean name
- Hangul: 이만희
- Hanja: 李萬熙
- RR: I Manhui
- MR: I Manhŭi
- Criminal information
- Status: Remanded in custody
- Criminal charge: Violation of the Political Parties Act

Details
- Date apprehended: 24 June 2026

Lee Man-hee (Korean: 이만희; born 15 September 1931) is a South Korean cult leader. Lee is the founder of the Shincheonji Church of Jesus, a South Korean religious group with teachings derived from Christianity that is considered a pseudoreligion or cult by mainstream Christian churches. Lee is a self-proclaimed messiah, whose followers believe he is immortal and infallible.

== Early life ==
Lee was born on 15 September 1931 in Punggak-myeon, Cheongdo County, North Gyeongsang Province (Keishōhoku-dō), Japanese Korea, Empire of Japan. He is a descendant of the Jeonju Yi clan. Before founding his own religious movement, he was a member of the group known as Olive Tree and of another movement called the Tabernacle Temple (장막성전).

Lee claimed to have served as a sergeant in the 7th Infantry Division of the Republic of Korea Army during the Korean War; however, there is no clear evidence to support this assertion. After the war, he returned to Punggak Village and worked as a farmer.

== COVID-19 outbreak ==
On 22 February 2020, South Korea confirmed that 231 of their 433 cases of COVID-19 were from within the Shincheonji sect. Lee called the coronavirus a "devil's deed" intended to stop the sect's growth, but he canceled all gatherings of his faith. The Korea Centers for Disease Control and Prevention said the practice of gathering followers in close quarters for religious services may have contributed to the fast spread of the disease.

On 1 March 2020, Seoul mayor Park Won-soon announced that the Seoul Metropolitan Government had made a criminal complaint about Lee, asking for an investigation into him and twelve others connected to the sect on charges of murder and violations of the Disease Control Act, citing their negligence in preventing an outbreak among their parishioners and their refusal to cooperate with the government throughout the crisis.

On 31 July 2020, Lee was arrested by South Korean authorities for allegedly violating the Infectious Disease and Control Act. At issue was a dispute over withholding data from the government for contact tracing, with the church asserting privacy. Lee was also charged with embezzlement and other crimes. By this time, the Shincheonji Church was being linked to more than 5,200 coronavirus infections or 36% of South Korea’s total cases. On 13 January 2021 Suwon District Court in Seoul acquitted Lee of violating the infectious disease laws. However, Lee was convicted of embezzling 5.6 billion won ($4.7m USD) and obstruction of public affairs. Lee was sentenced to three years in prison. He remains out of jail on probation for four years.

== Controversies ==
=== Adoptive son's threat controversy ===
Kwon Tae-ryeong, head of the "Recover Alliance for Victims of Heretical Religions and Human Rights" (Recover), has alleged that Yoo Chun-soon, the legal wife of Shincheonji leader Lee Man-hee, was forcibly admitted to a nursing hospital. He further claimed that Lee’s adopted son, demanded Yoo disclose her bank account password, which she reportedly refused. According to Gong Hee-sook, a former instructor and whistleblower, Yoo’s assets are estimated to be worth 3.1 billion KRW.

=== Sued for sexual exploitation under authority ===
Gong Hee-sook, a former instructor, filed a lawsuit against Lee, accusing him of sexual exploitation under the pretext of his authority. Gong, who joined Shincheonji in 1992, claims that between 1997 and 2002, she was sexually exploited by Lee. Within Shincheonji, Lee was considered an individual with absolute authority, and Gong asserts that she could not resist this authority. Although Gong did not initially recognize the sexual exploitation due to the church's teachings and Lee's authority, she came to realize the abuse after leaving the organization in 2022, leading her to file the lawsuit. Shincheonji, however, denies Gong's allegations and educates its members that her claims are false. Gong has stated that she will continue fighting to ensure that no more victims emerge.

=== Electoral interference ===
On 24 June 2026, Lee was arrested on charges of electoral interference over the recruitment of thousands of Shincheonji members into the People Power Party.

== Publications ==
- The Truth of Revelation (1985)
- The Complete Interpretation of Revelation (1986)
- The Truth of Revelation 2 (1988)
- The Reality of Revelation (1993)
- The Reality of the Book of Revelation (2005)
- The Acts of Jesus Christ (2006)
- The Creation of Heaven and Earth (2007)
- Revelation and Commentary (2008)
- The Hall of Truth I (2009), II (2010), III (2011)

== See also ==
- List of messiah claimants
