= Victory Altar =

Controversial South Korean religious group

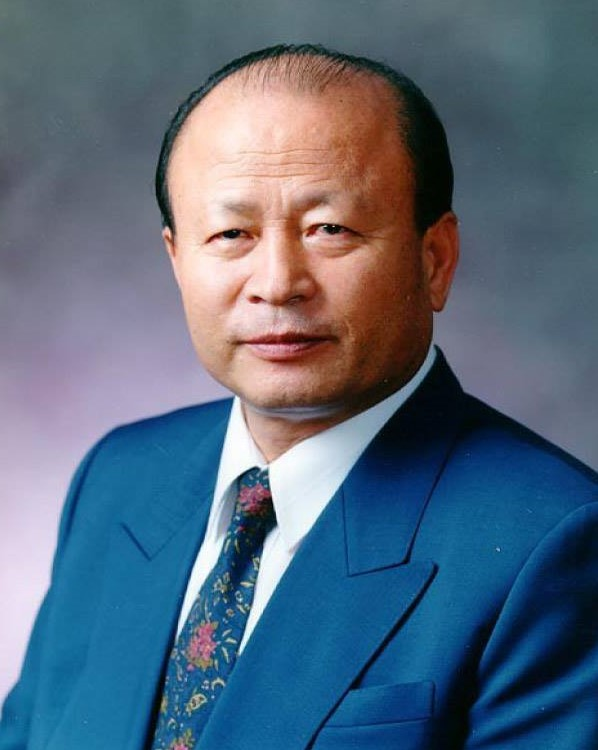
The group's founding leader Cho Hee Sung

Victory Altar (Korean: 승리제단; RR: Seungnijedan; MR: Sŭngnijedan) is a South Korean religious movement that has often been characterized as a cult. The mainstream Protestant denominations in South Korea reportedly consider it to be heretical (이단). It was founded in 1981 in Bucheon, Gyeonggi, South Korea by Cho Hee Sung (조희성). It is also known by the name Yeongsaeng-gyo (영생교).

== Description ==
=== Founding ===
According to The Hankyoreh, the group's website says that Cho originally attended a Presbyterian church in Gimpo. He was eventually taken prisoner by the North Korean People's Army during the Korean War. After his release, he committed himself further to religion and decided to attend the Daehan Theological Seminary & University. Afterwards, he served as an officer in the South Korean Armed Forces and allegedly established seven middle and high schools and several churches. Cho suffered from lung and ear diseases, but was allegedly miraculously cured after meeting Park Tae Son, the founding leader of the Olive Tree religious movement. Following this, on October 15, 1980, he claimed to have completely eliminated evil in himself and claimed to have begun a movement to save humanity.

The group was founded and led by Cho in 1981 in Bucheon, Gyeonggi as "Yeongsaeng-gyo The Lord's Crusade Victory Altar" (영생교 하나님의 성회 승리제단).

=== Beliefs ===
The Hankyoreh also claims that the group believes Cho was a supernatural messiah (or it claims, equivalently, the Buddha), and that following him would earn people the power to heal diseases and everlasting life. The newspaper reported that some of its members believed Cho was still alive, even in 2021. According to The Dong-A Ilbo, the group believes that God is the progenitor of mankind, and that people have become corrupted, resulting in the change of their skin color.

The Hankyoreh also claimed that the group pledged five goals: to eliminate communism from the world, to end the summer monsoon season, prevent typhoons, ensure good harvests, and prevent war from breaking out in Korea.

Mainstream Protestant denominations in South Korea consider the group to be heretical.

=== Controversy ===
In 1994, Cho was arrested for fraudulent donations. In 1998, he was sentenced to serve time in prison.

In 2003, the group gained infamy when police investigated the disappearance of 15 of its followers. Police eventually found human remains buried in the church's garden. Cho, who was then serving a six-year prison sentence, was again charged with fraud, exploitation of labor, and illegal detention. In 2004, he was eventually sentenced to death, along with two other church members. Before his execution however, he died of a heart attack in August 2004.

Since Cho's death in 2004, the group has been led by Lee Yeong-ja (이영자) as of February 2021.

During the COVID-19 pandemic in South Korea, The Dong-A Ilbo reported that the group agreed to not host in-person services between January 16, 2020 and February 18, 2021. The group also claimed it would maintain strict social distancing during any gatherings it would hold, with less than 10% occupation in worship spaces. However, according to the Bucheon government, on February 9, 20 people were confirmed to have the disease with 16 cases at a male dormitory it operated, 1 in a female dormitory, 2 in a factory where its members worked, and 1 in its orchestra. The following day, The Hankyoreh reported that, of an investigation of 273 people affiliated with the church, 53 people were confirmed to have the disease. That day, the group released a public apology, promising full cooperation with the government to manage the spread of the disease.

== See also ==
- Shincheonji Church of Jesus
- Unification Church
- Good News Mission
- Manmin Central Church
- Providence (religious movement)
- Evangelical Baptist Church of Korea
