= Olive Tree (religious movement) =

Christian new religious movement founded in South Korea by Park Tae Son

Olive Tree is the most common English name of a Christian new religious movement founded in South Korea by Park Tae Son (Korean: 박태선; Hanja: 朴泰善; MR: Pak T'aesŏn). The movement was originally known in Korea as Jesus Christ Congregation Revival Association of Korea (Korean: 한국예수교전도관부흥협회; RR: Hanguk Yesugyo Jeondogwan Buheung Hyeophoe) and later as The Church of Heavenly Father (Korean: 천부교; Hanja: 天父敎; RR: Cheonbugyo). In a revised 2009 version of his 1996 doctoral dissertation on the history of Korean Pentecostalism, pastor Young Hoon Lee called the Olive Tree "the fastest growing and largest of the Korean syncretistic religions during the 1950s and 1960s," although he noted it had become "largely insignificant" by the end of the 20th century.

The Olive Tree is regarded as a cult by mainline Christian denominations in Korea, and Korean scholar Kim Chang Han has argued in his doctoral dissertation that combating the Olive Tree was a main reason for the emergence of an organized anti-cult movement in South Korea.

== Origins ==
Park Tae Son was born in Yup nam ri, Duk Chon, North Pyeongan province of present-day North Korea in 1915. He was raised as Presbyterian in a poor family that could only allow him to receive a primary school education. To improve his life, he went to Japan where he worked as a milkman and newsboy during the day and was able to complete Technical High School through evening courses. According to American anthropologist Felix Moos, Park felt discriminated against in Japan as a Korean, which explains why he maintained a strong anti-Japanese orientation in later life.

In 1944, Park returned to Korea where he started attending a Presbyterian church near Namdaemun gate in Seoul and became a moderately successful businessperson by launching his own Korea Precision Machine Company. In 1954, he became an elder in the Presbyterian Church and started conducting revival services. In 1955, he was one of the main preachers at a large Presbyterian revival meeting organized at Namsan Mountain near Seoul. There, he claimed to have instantaneously healed a man who had been a cripple for thirty years.

The incident converted Park into a nationally well-known preacher, and in April 1955 he formed the Jesus Christ Congregation Revival Association of Korea (한국예수교전도관부흥협회), originally as part of the Presbyterian Church. The latter saw it as a potentially schismatic organization and was suspicious of Park’s claim of supernatural powers and messianic status. Park was tried for heresy and expelled from the Presbyterian Church in 1956.

No longer a Presbyterian, Park started his own church. He gathered thousands eager to be healed through a ritual he called anch’al (laying on of hands), a sort of strong massage supposed to transmit divine energy from Park to the infirm. Even the water with which Park’s feet had been washed was drunk by his devotees for healing and spiritual purposes.

Park revealed that he was one of the two witnesses mentioned in the Book of Revelation and called "Olive Trees" or perhaps both of them in one person, hence the name "Olive Tree" popularly designating the movement. Park also claimed to be the "righteous man from the East" mentioned in the Book of Isaiah 41.2 and identified "the East" with Korea. His followers at that time believed he was not God, but the last prophet of God before the millennial kingdom and God’s only authorized spokesperson on Earth.

== Success and controversies ==
Although the exact number of followers he gathered is a matter of controversy, Park’s became one of the largest new religious movements in Korea, with perhaps two million members in the mid-1960s. It built three "Christian towns," model villages where followers lived communally.

At the same time, mainline Christian denominations and several Korean media regarded Park’s movement as a cult and organized the first of the future large Korean anti-cult movement. Lee answered that there was indeed in South Korea a problem with cults, but these were the Jehovah’s Witnesses and the Unification Movement founded by Sun Myung Moon rather than his own organization. He was also accused of practicing P'ikareum, a ritual where female devotees have sex with the male messianic figure in order to achieve purity.

Park was arrested for fraud four times, although he initially managed to obtain lenient sentences due to his good relations with president Syngman Rhee, to whom the Olive Tree offered the votes of its followers. With the decline of Rhee’s power and his eventual exile from Korea however, Park spent longer periods in jail, both for deceiving his followers with false healing claims and defrauding them of their money (which was then not declared to the tax office) and for illegal electoral practices supporting pro-Rhee candidates. Park was in jail from 27 December 1958 to 26 March 1960 and from 27 January 1961 to 10 January 1962.

In December 1960, some 2,000 Olive Tree followers attacked the offices of the Korean newspaper The Dong-a Ilbo, which had called Park a fraud, overcoming some 400 police officers who tried to protect the premises. The incident led to further media criticism of the movement, which was placed under police surveillance. The controversies did not initially affect the success of the Olive Tree, which continued to grow and open new churches and other facilities through the 1960s and the 1970s.

== Decline after 1980 ==
By 1980, Park had started presenting a new theology. He revealed that ninety-five percent of the Bible was wrong, Jesus was not the Christ, and the real Messiah was Park himself, who was also God the Creator, while the God mentioned in the Christian Bible was in fact a "king devil." He also taught he would never die and would enter the Millennium with his body.

Contrary to his expectations, only a limited percentage of his followers were ready to accept what scholar Kim Chang Han called in his dissertation a "radical divorce from Christian beliefs," and the movement quickly declined. Another reason for the decline was Park’s ill health in his last years. He suffered from diabetes and tuberculosis and was also diagnosed with schizophrenia.

Park died in 1990 and his remaining followers divided into rival groups. The largest one, with a few thousand followers, continues its activities under the name The Church of Heavenly Father (Cheonbugyo, 천부교). The center of its doctrine and worship is the claim that Park is God, indeed the only true God, and that his spirit is present in The Church of Heavenly Father, where it can be perceived through a divine perfume and ectoplasm-like manifestations.

Founders of other successful Korean new religious movements were once members of the Olive Tree. These include Victory Altar and Shincheonji, founded in 1981 and 1984 respectively. Additionally, the Dongbang Church, Tabernacle Temple, Gospel Evangelical Association, and Eden Revival Association can also be considered sects that originated from the Olive Tree movement. Their theologies have been claimed to be influenced by Park.
