= Tabernacle Temple Church =

South Korean pseudo-Christian movement

Tabernacle Temple (South Korea)
- 장막성전
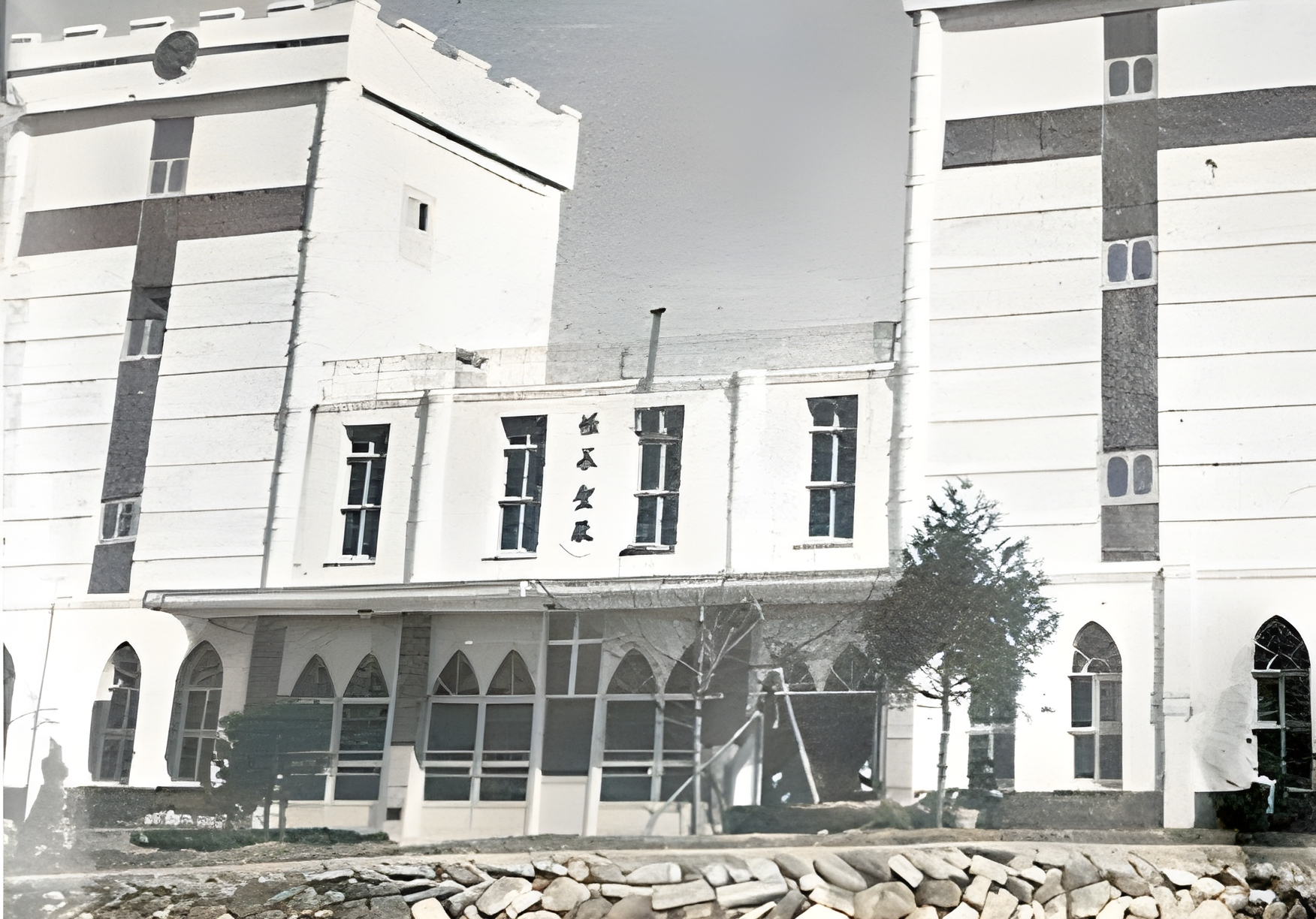
- Tabernacle Temple Headquarters located in Makgyeri Gwacheon
- Classification: Christian new religious movement
- Leader: Yoo Jae-yeol (유재열)
- Region: South Korea
- Founder: Yoo Jae-yeol (유재열)
- Origin: 14 March 1966; South Korea; Tabernacle Temple
- Branched from: Hosaeng Prayer Center (a pseudo-Christian group led by Kim Jong-gyu)
- Defunct: October 1980 (Tabernacle Temple’s demolition in 1979-1980 recorded in the History of Seoul Land’s Development)
- Members: 2,000 (According to prosecutors published by Donga Ilbo Newspaper)
- Other names: Tabernacle Temple, Jangmak Seongjeon (accepted common name). Known by Shincheonji as Tabernacle of the 7 Golden lampstands

Korean name
- Hangul: 장막성전
- Hanja: 帳幕聖殿
- Revised Romanization: Jangmak Seongjeon
- McCune–Reischauer: Changmak Sŏngjŏn

The Tabernacle Temple (Korean: 장막성전) was a South Korean end times Christian new religious movement founded by Yoo Jae-yeol and his father Yoo In-gu on March 14, 1966, and disbanded in September 1980. The founders claimed to be the Two Witnesses mentioned in the Bible’s Book of Revelation of Apostle John.

The church successfully recruited over 2,000 members to Gwacheon through Yoo Jae-yeol's prophecy of the world’s end in September 1969, and that only those who gathered inside the Tabernacle Temple before this day would be saved. Two years after their failed doomsday prediction, a new headquarters was built in Makgye-ri, Gwacheon 1971. Soon after, scandals regarding their fraud, corruption and abuse began to surface, the church eventually caught the attention of the public and law enforcement which led to their downfall.

== Founders ==
All the founders were former members of the pseudo-Christian group called the Hosaeng Prayer Center 호생기도원, led by cult leader Kim Jong-gyu.

The King and 7 Angels
| Name | Religious Title | Details |
|---|---|---|
| Yoo In-gu | King Immauel | Yoo Jae-yeol's father and married to the sister of Shin Jong-hwan. He acted as 'the King' over the '7 angels' and a witness of God [Revelation 11]. Kicked out of the Tabernacle Temple in 1967, but returned and left again in 1969. Prior to establishing the church, he practiced medicine fraudulently under his brother's medical license, who was taken away to North Korea. |
| Yoo Jae-yeol | Angel Samson, (Young servant, Counselor, Spirit of Truth) | He founded the church along with his father and claimed to be the second witness of God [Revelation 11] and the young servant angel who eats the open scroll [Revelation 10]. In 1975, he was arrested, imprisoned (2.5 years) and was under probation (4 years) before leaving for America in October 1980. He was born in Bukmun-ro, Cheongju-si, Chungcheongbuk-do as the eldest son of Yoo In-goo and Shin Jong-soon. |
| Kim Chang-do | Angel Michael | Left the Tabernacle Temple in September 1980. A former gangster from Noryangjin, nickname: Motorcycle. |
| Jung Chang-rae | Angel Samuel | Left the Tabernacle Temple in September 1980. Born in Chungcheong-do. |
| Baek Man-bong | Angel Solomon | Represented the Church of Sardis, and left the Tabernacle Temple in 1969 and started another similar end time cult in 1977. |
| Shin Kwang-il | Angel Joshua | Represented the Church of Philadelphia, but left the Tabernacle Temple in 1969 to perform his military service. |
| Kim Young-ae | Angel Dira | Left the Tabernacle Temple in September 1980. |
| Shin Jong-hwan | Angel Moses | Kicked out of the Tabernacle Temple in 1969. Over a decade later, he would briefly join another Pseudo-Christian group Shincheonji with Shin Kwang-il. |

== History ==
- Yoo Jae-yeol, born on February 1, 1949.
- In 1964, Yoo Jae-yeol and his family joined one of South Korea's many emerging end time pseudo-Christian groups, the Hosaeng Prayer Center in Sangdo-dong, Seoul. Following their leader Kim Jong-gyu. Founded on January 4, 1964, this end time cult advertised the miraculous healing powers of their leader.
- In 1965, Yoo Jae-yeol dropped out of High school and followed Kim Jong-gyu to Makgye-ri Gwacheon during the expansion of the church. While scandals erupted regarding the leader's sexual affairs with many of the church's female members, Yoo Jae-yeol soon left in February 1966 along with his parents and 20 other members to establish the Tabernacle Temple.
- Yoo Jae-yeol claimed he received revelation from God in 1965 and was raised in a booth for 100 days. He founded the Tabernacle Temple the following year.
- The Temple of the Tabernacle was called a 'refuge from the final judgment' and there were 400 households in the Cheonggyesan reservoir area in Makgye-dong (Source: Seoul Urban Planning Story, Vol. 4), and its influence expanded to the point where about 2,000 believers lived in groups across the country.
- In 1975, Yoo Jae-yeol was imprisoned for fraud and embezzlement.
- Yoo Jae-yeol immigrated to the United States in October 1980 and the church was officially dismantled.

== Doctrines ==
Doctrines of the Tabernacle Temple were mainly contributed by Yoo Jae-yeol and Yoo In-gu, who were influenced by the teachings they've received from Kim Jong-gyu of the Hosaeng Prayer Center 호생기도원 . On February 1, 1970, Yoo Jae-yeol wrote a document called 'The current state of our temple' which records the various beliefs, practices and doctrines taught within the church, these were investigated and documented in Chapter 2 'Korean Christian Tabernacle Temple' of the book 'New Religion in Korea Volume 3" published in 1974 by Tak Myung Hwan.

=== Beliefs about Their Leader Yoo Jae-yeol ===
Believed that the founder Yoo Jae-yeol is:

1. the Counselor sent by God, the Spirit of truth,

2.the one who reaps (Harvests) the grains of eternal life,

3. the messenger whom God designated as the bearer of the seal,

4. the one who received God's revelation, ate the book sealed with seven seals in 1966,

5.the prophet of the nations and the servant whom all peoples used as their symbol,

6. the young servant is the one who will receive the power of the seven kingdoms to rule over all nations,

7. the child servant born out of the person who abandoned the umbilical cord without cutting it. Referring to the fact that he was reared under Kim Jong-gyu's ministry as a part of the interpretation of Ezekiel 16:4-5,

8.The young servant 'male child' who will receive the supreme authority to rule over all the nations (Revelation 12:5).

=== Their Claims ===
Like many pseudo-Christian groups they claim to have a unique understanding of scripture. In a document written by Yoo Jae-yeol, The Current State of Our Temple (우리 성전의 현황) and chapter 2 in the book New Religion in Korea Volume 3 written by Tak Myeong Hwan in 1974, we find details of what was taught and believed by members of the Tabernacle Temple since its founding.

1) The Last days & The End Time Prophecy: The “War of Armageddon” Will Fulfill on Sep 14, 1969.

a. These are the last days, and existing churches do not have salvation, and pastors are hired pastors and false pastors. You must come here to receive true salvation.

b. "I am just replicating what God, who sent me, told me and showed me"

c. Secret pairing in the Bible, "Jesus did not speak unless it was a parable or parable, but today, in the end times, he clearly shows spiritual things and tells them as they are. (2 Peter 1:21, Isaiah 34:16)"

d. In the last days, "salvation is achieved by selecting only one nation (Ezekiel 3:1-5)."

2) 7 angels & the Tabernacle Temple

a. Their Mission

Gen19:1-2, Rev21:17, Heb13:1; To gather believers to be sheltered from the Apocalypse until salvation is accomplished.

b. 7 lampstands, horns, messengers, lamps of God

King Zerubbabel or Emmanuel (Yoo In-gu) led the 7 angels: Young Servant or Angel Samson (Yoo Jae-yeol), Angel Joshua (Shin Gwang-il), Angel Tira (Kim Young-ae), Angel Michael (Kim Chang-do), Angel Samuel (Jeong Chang-rae), Angel Solomon(Baek Man-bong), Angel Moses (Shin Jong Hwan)

c. Structure of the Church:

7 angels wore silver badges, the 24 elders wore white badges, the 48 deacons wore red badges, the 70 monks wore blue badges, and the general believers wore black badges.

3) The fulfillment of the Abomination of Destruction “The Beast”:

The first 20-40 members of the Tabernacle Temple were former members and victims of Hosaeng Prayer Center.

After joining the Tabernacle Temple, they were convinced that their former pastor was an agent of Satan as recorded in Ezekiel 16: 4-5, Mat 24 :15 - referring to Kim Jong-kyu as the Abomination and the Beast.

They claim “the reason why the evil one appeared in this way was because of the work of Satan, so that he would not be saved when he came to the point of destruction by deception of all powers, signs, and false miracles (2 Thessalonians 1:9,10). Therefore, you should not believe that it is a spirit, and you must have the wisdom to discern whether it is a spirit of truth or a spirit of delusion (John 1:4~6)”

== Downfall & lawsuits ==
In 1971, the first official criminal report and lawsuit was filed against the Tabernacle Temple and the leaders including Yoo Jae-Yeol. Amongst the followers who filed the complaints were Lee Man-hee and Hong Jae-ho, the founders of Shincheonji Church of Jesus, another pseudo-Christian group that is still active today in South Korea.

In September 1975, The Yeongdeungpo branch of the Seoul District Prosecutor's Office arrested four people, including the head of the Korean Christian Tabernacle Temple, Yoo Jae-yeol (26 years old at the time), Kim Chang-do (41 years old at the time), the deacon, and the leader's secretary, on charges of violating the Punishment Act such as fraud, identity theft and violence, as well as making false allegations against their members.

According to the prosecutor who investigated the tabernacle temple at the time, "the mortality rate was very high only where the tabernacle temple was located, and all the property of believers was extorted without providing meals". Yoo gathered about 2,000 believers and moved them to Gwacheon go build a church building and a luxury house with the donations and labor of his followers. And while expanding the church, Yoo and many of the leaders continued to hijacked their members' houses, farms and rice fields by mortgaging them, but also robbed the believers' factories and sexually abused female members.

By October 1980, Pastor Oh Pyeong-ho took charge of the Tabernacle Temple organization, which was left-behind by Yoo, and seemed to be carrying out reforms. And according to Pastor Oh's testimony and Book 1 of The Story of Seoul's Urban Planning by Son Jeong-mok, regarding the development of Seoul Grand Park, the property of the Tabernacle Temple church in Makgye-ri was bought by Seoul metropolitan government and demolished for the construction of Seoul Land.
