= Shincheonji Church of Jesus =

Korean new religious movement

Shincheonji
- 신천지
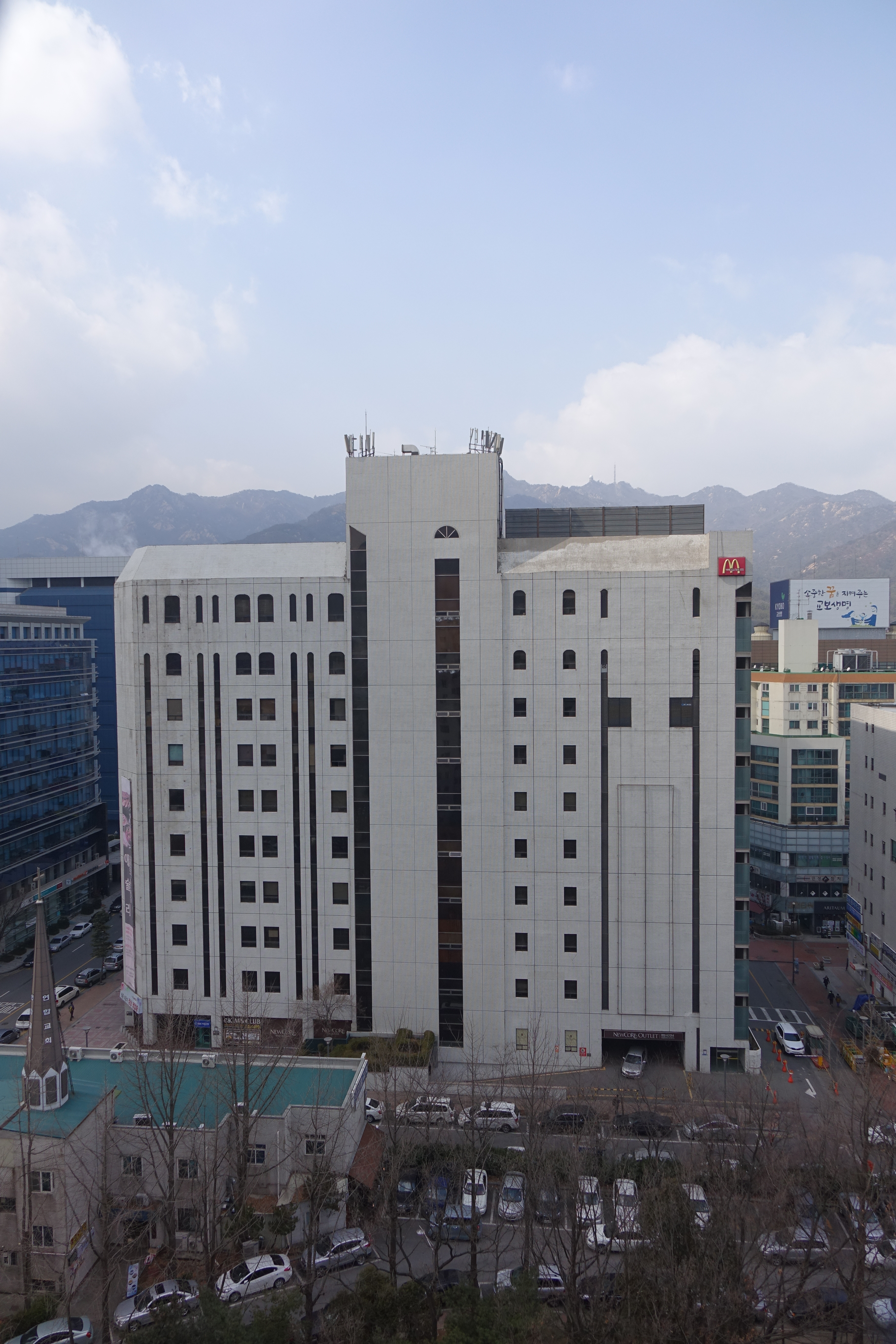
- Shincheonji Headquarters located in Gwacheon
- Classification: Christian new religious movement
- Leader: Lee Man-hee
- Associations: Heavenly Culture, World Peace, Restoration of Light; International Women's Peace Group (IWPG); Priend; International Peace Youth Group (IPYG); Cheonji Ilbo; Eduzion
- Region: South Korea and abroad
- Founder: Lee Man-hee
- Origin: 14 March 1984; South Korea
- Branched from: Christianity; Tabernacle Temple Church; Olive Tree
- Members: 317,320 (According to the Health Ministry of South Korea); 245,605
- Other name: Shincheonji (accepted common name)
- Official website: shincheonji.org

Korean name
- Hangul: 신천지
- Hanja: 新天地
- RR: Sincheonji
- MR: Sinch'ŏnji

Shincheonji Church of Jesus, the Temple of the Tabernacle of the Testimony (SCJ), commonly known as Shincheonji Church of Jesus or simply Shincheonji (Korean: 신천지; Hanja: 新天地; lit. 'New Heaven and New Earth'; IPA: [ɕintɕʰʌndʑi]), is an Abrahamic monotheistic new religious movement established in South Korea by Lee Man-hee in 1984. It has been described as a pseudoreligion or cult by mainstream churches, journalists and scholars.

Shincheonji's teaching claims that its chairman, Lee Man-hee, is the pastor promised in the New Testament, and that the Book of Revelation was written in secret parables whose meaning was revealed to Chairman Lee by God. Shincheonji teaches that it is the one true religion, with its members receiving salvation at the Last Judgment. Its adherents believe everyone not in the group will be denied forgiveness and destroyed. Worldwide, the number of members is estimated at around 270,000 to over 300,000 in 2026.

The group is known for its aggressive proselytizing activities, in which—according to numerous reports—Shincheonji members employ methods that prioritize the success of their conversion efforts without any regard for others. Entire congregations or congregational groups in various countries are deliberately infiltrated with the ultimate goal of taking them over in their entirety.

In 2020, the group came under intense scrutiny during the COVID-19 pandemic in South Korea. The outbreak of COVID-19 was initially centered in Daegu, after a 61-year-old Shincheonji member known as "Patient 31" infected other church members, causing the pandemic to surge in the city. As the disease spread among Shincheonji members and thousands of others, there was a national outcry against the group, and by 22 February 2020 over 1.3 million South Korean citizens signed an online petition to the Blue House, requesting the government to disband Shincheonji entirely. On 12 August 2022, the Supreme Court of Korea upheld the acquittal of Lee Man-hee on charges that he obstructed the government's response to COVID-19 outbreaks in 2020.

In 2026, Le Man-Hee was the subject of two investigations : one concerning his having encouraged his followers to join the conservative Liberty Korea party, and the other for tax fraud.

== Doctrine ==
The group is apocalyptic and messianic in character, and has been described as a doomsday cult.

The group's founder and leader is variously referred to by church followers as "Chairman Lee (이 총회장)"; "the Chairman (회장)"; "the Promised Pastor (약속의 목자)"; "the One who Overcomes (이긴자)"; or "the Advocate (대언자)." Adherents believe Lee is the successor to Jesus Christ, and as having the unique ability to interpret the Book of Revelation. The group also believes in the times of fulfillment of New Testament prophecies, the most pious 144,000 adherents of the church will enjoy salvation and eternal life as promised in Revelation 7.

The group is known for its aggressive and deceptive proselytizing practices. Due to its image in South Korean society, Shincheonji leaders have at times instructed their followers to lie about their membership, which the group has stated is not official policy.

In 2022, a court ruled the practice of "Shincheonji Deceptive Evangelism" illegal, defined as members of Shincheonji secretly teaching their doctrines while hiding their affiliation. The group is regarded as heretical by mainstream Christian denominations.

== History ==
Lee Man-hee was born in 1931, and in 1967, became a member of the Tabernacle Temple Church. The church became affiliated with the Presbyterian Church due to pressure from the "religious purification policy" of President Chun Doo-hwan. This led to Man-hee leaving the Tabernacle Temple in 1971.

Lee was also previously a member of the Olive Tree, a new religious movement and a major influence on the first anti-cult movement in postwar South Korea. This fact, however, was not present in Shincheonji's biography of Lee.

On March 14, 1984, Lee founded Shincheonji and opened its first temple that June in Anyang, Gyeonggi Province. Membership grew, and in June 1990, the Zion Christian Mission Center was established in Seoul. In 1995, membership within South Korea was divided into 12 "tribes" according to geographic territories. In 1999, headquarters were moved to Gwacheon, which has a prophetic meaning within Shincheonji theology.

Once its structure within South Korea had been consolidated, the sect’s 12 South Korean "tribes" were, from the turn of the millennium, systematically tasked with carrying out missionary work abroad.

Beginning in 2000, the group expanded into Europe and across the globe. That same year, Shincheonji opened its first European branch in Berlin, Germany. From 2006 onward, its activities in Germany intensified significantly. Other early centers were established in Los Angeles (1996), Sydney (2009), and Cape Town (2012).

The sect has deliberately sought out partnerships with other churches. Its strategy includes entering into agreements (memorandums of understanding) with traditional Christian congregations worldwide. According to the group’s own claims, hundreds of foreign churches have even replaced their own signage with that of the Shincheonji Church in order to adopt its teachings.

== Organization and structure ==
Shincheonji is organised into 24 administrative departments, centered around the chairman, who is considered as the Promised Pastor in the New Testament. There are also seven educational directors responsible for education, and twelve tribe leaders, named after the twelve disciples of Jesus, who lead "tribes" consisting of smaller churches.

The church says its organization replicates the heavenly spiritual organization in Revelation 4.

=== Twelve Tribes ===
The names of the twelve tribes are taken from the names of Twelve Apostles (replacing Judas with Matthias).

- Seoul James: Northern Seoul and Northeastern Gyeonggi Province (Yeoncheon County, Dongducheon City, Uijeongbu City, Pocheon City, Gapyeong County, Namyangju City, Guri City, Gwacheon City)
- John: Southern Seoul and Southern Gyeonggi Province
- Bartholomew: Western Seoul and Western Gyeonggi Province
- Matthew: All of Incheon
- Simon: Northern Seoul and Northwestern Gyeonggi Province (Paju City, Goyang City)
- Philip: Gangwon Province and parts of North Chungcheong Province
- Matthias: the rest of North Chungcheong Province, South Chungcheong Province, Daejeon Metropolitan City, and Sejong Special Autonomous City
- Thaddaeus: North Gyeongsang Province and Daegu Metropolitan City
- Andrew: South Gyeongsang Province (except Miryang City, Namhae County, Goseong County, Changwon City, Geoje City), Busan Metropolitan City (except Gangseo District), Ulsan Metropolitan City, and Jeju Island
- Busan James: Gangseo District in Busan Metropolitan City, the rest of South Gyeongsang Province (Miryang City, Namhae County, Goseong County, Changwon City, Geoje City, and Gimhae City)
- Thomas: North Jeolla Province
- Peter: South Jeolla Province and Gwangju Metropolitan City

== Seasons and festivals ==
Shincheonji has four official seasons throughout the year. Excluding the Founding Anniversary, these seasons are related to religious observances in the Old Testament and are typically observed on dates recorded.

=== Founding Anniversary (March 14) ===
This day commemorates the date when Lee Man-hee, titled chairman, founded Shincheonji.

=== Passover (January 14) ===
Passover is observed on January 14. The origin of Passover for Christians and Jews generally lies in events (often considered legendary) reported in Exodus 12:1-14, Leviticus 23:5, when God judged Egypt with the Ten Plagues through Moses and delivered the Israelites from slavery in Egypt. The Passover observed by Shincheonji is more focused on the promise made by Jesus reported in Luke 22:14-20 and Matthew 26:17-29. It is a festival of thanksgiving to God for guiding them through the revealed Word (the blood and flesh of Jesus) and for leading them out of spiritual Babylon (death) to spiritual Zion (God's Kingdom and Shincheonji), which is the life path (Revelation 16:12, 17:14, 18:4).

=== Feast of Tabernacles (July 15) ===
The origin of the Feast of Tabernacles is found in what Leviticus 23:33-44 reports as God's command to Moses that Israelites should dwell in booths to remember their journey out of Egypt. Rather than physical booths made of grass, in modern celebrations, people are metaphorically referred to as grass (1 Peter 1:24). The Feast of Tabernacles is observed as a journey by the members of Shincheonji from a world without the group's teachings into a world with them. These members are said to become spiritual booths (i.e., homes) where the Holy Spirit dwells, and they offer thanksgiving to God (Isaiah 40:6-7, 1 Corinthians 3:16).

=== Feast of Ingathering (September 24) ===
The origin of the Feast of Ingathering is the practice reported in Exodus 23:14-17, where Israelites would offer thanks to God as they harvested their crops and stored them in barns. Today, the Feast of Ingathering is observed as a spiritual harvest, a festival of thanksgiving for being harvested and gathered into God's kingdom, the barn (Mount Zion, Shincheonji). The date was chosen as the anniversary of when the foundation of the Holy Temple in Jerusalem was laid, as extrapolated from Haggai 2.

== Membership ==
In 2014, Shincheonji was estimated to have over 120,000 members, while a 2020 estimate put membership at around 200,000. It was once the fastest-growing religious church in South Korea.

In March 2020, health authorities of the Government of South Korea investigating the COVID-19 pandemic declared that they obtained a list of 317,320 registered Shincheonji members.

== Ministries ==
=== Overseas church MOUs and signboard changes ===
As of early August 2024, Shincheonji claims to have signed 12,979 memoranda of understanding (MOUs) in 84 countries, with 705 accumulated domestically. Additionally, 1,352 churches in 41 countries have replaced their signs with those of the Shincheonji Church of Jesus and are requesting the dispatch of instructors and Bible education. A representative of the Shincheonji Busan James Tribe stated, "Not only in India but around the world, requests for educational support from the Zion Christian Mission Center of the Shincheonji Church of Jesus and for incorporation into Shincheonji are increasing." The representative further emphasized that they will continue to actively engage with pastors of established churches, aiming for cooperation. However, this has sparked controversy as it was revealed to be the result of deceiving foreign pastors who were unaware of Shincheonji's falsehoods and true nature.

=== Shincheonji Volunteer Group ===
The Shincheonji Volunteer Group is a subsidiary organization established by Shincheonji, composed of its members. Their activities began in earnest during the 1988-1989 Seoul Olympics. Since then, the Shincheonji Volunteer Group has been actively involved in various initiatives, including volunteer work for underprivileged communities, environmental cleanup efforts, and support activities for people with disabilities and elderly individuals living alone. These efforts are aimed at improving the group's public image. Currently, the Shincheonji Volunteer Group operates regionally, conducting activities across different areas.

== Opposition ==
In Singapore, 21 members were arrested in 2020 for congregating and were charged with being a part of an "unlawful society." They face up to three years in jail if convicted.

In 2020, China banned Shincheonji.

=== Threats towards Shincheonji ===
On April 4, 2020, a 39-year-old man threw a rock at the Ulsan branch church building, breaking a glass window at the front entrance. His stated motivation was his thinking Shincheonji members spread COVID-19. On August 26, 2020, he was found guilty of property damage and was sentenced to six months in prison, with two years suspended sentence, and 80 hours of mandated volunteer work.

On 21 September 2020, the Daejeon branch church received an anonymous threat letter containing a strange white powder, later identified by the Chemical Safety Agency and the Geumgang Basin Environment Agency to be cyanide; a USB drive containing a Bitcoin address; and a message demanding ₩14.4 billion. The anonymous message stated harm would come upon Shincheonji congregants if the requested money was not deposited. The case is still under investigation, and police have ruled the threatening letter was originally addressed to a different Shincheonji building in Gyeonggi Province.

== Controversies ==
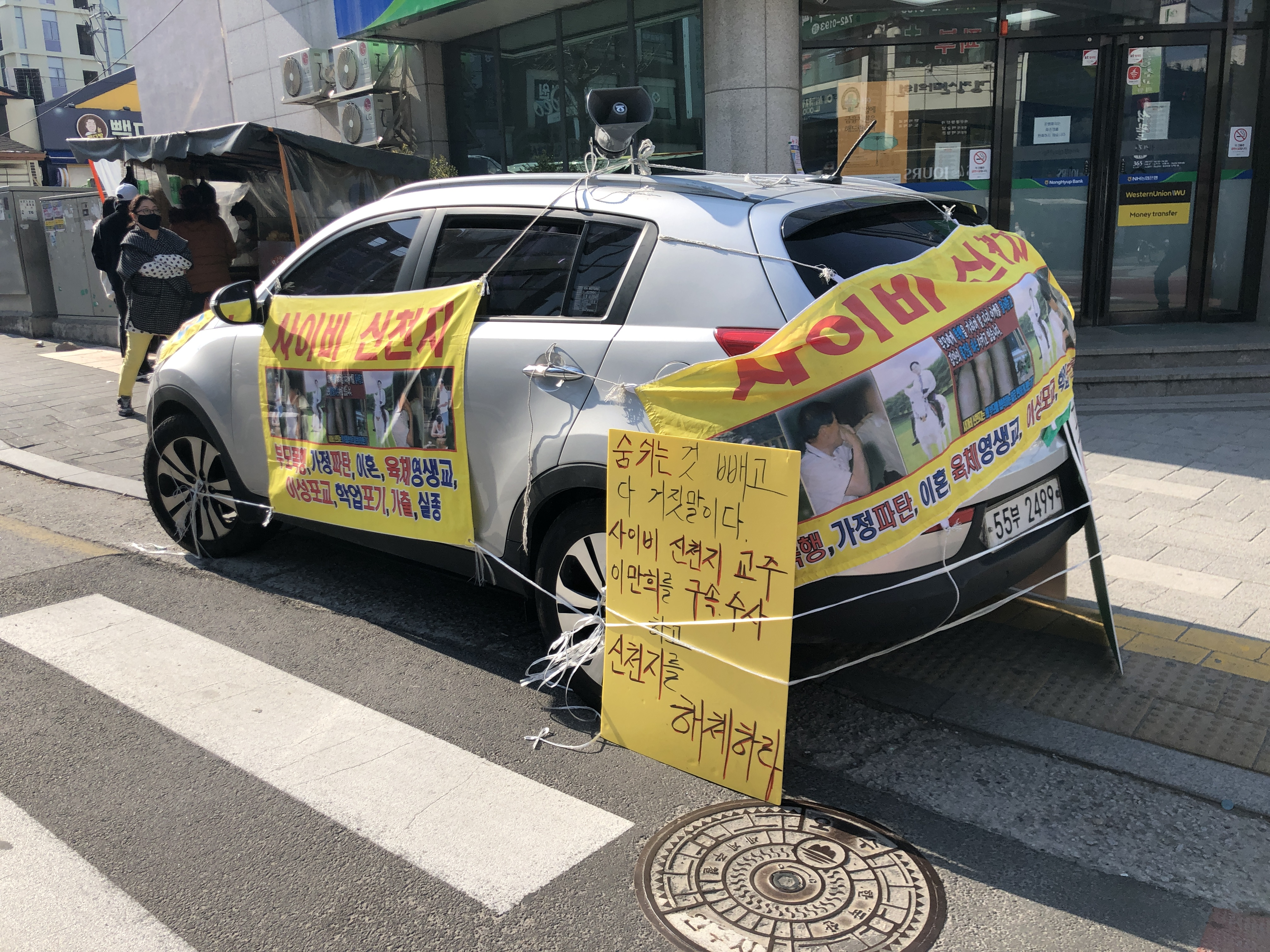
Protest against Shincheonji, Wonju

=== Political controversy ===
The group has been accused of exerting influence on politicians and political parties. A former member accused Chairman Lee of having created the name of the "Saenuri Party", the former name of the Liberty Korea Party. According to the Korea Times, Lee directed followers to sign up as members of the conservative party, and more than 56,000 of them did. In June 2026, Lee was arrested.

During the 2022 presidential elections, Telegram chatroom conversations of Shincheonji members were leaked, revealing evidence of opposition to a specific candidate in the election. This suggested an attempt to exert political influence by pressuring members to manage public opinion, and sparked widespread criticism.

Lee Nak-yon, former leader of the Democratic Party of Korea and current senior advisor of the New Future Democratic Party, lost a defamation lawsuit against a YouTuber who had claimed alleged ties of the former to Shincheonji.

=== Evangelism through infiltration and deception ===
The members of Shincheonji have been accused of actively infiltrating other churches to convert their members.

- South Korea – Its members have been reportedly sighted in Myeongdong Cathedral, allegedly pretending to be pious believers seeking to lure other Koreans or foreigners into their own religious meetings. In 2024, Mr. Jang, a current PR director at Shincheonji's Gwacheon headquarters, was caught posing as a former member of Shincheonji to infiltrate an anti-Shincheonji organization as a spy, causing widespread shock.
- Australia – Members of the church have targeted public areas and universities frequented by international students in Sydney and Melbourne. They would have started operating in Perth, Western Australia, in 2022 and perhaps earlier.
- Colombia – Its members have been reportedly sighted in the Basílica Menor Nuestra Señora de Lourdes, in Bogotá, claiming to know the truth from biblical studies and the apocalypse prophecy.
- India – In August 2019, the Baptist Convention in Manipur, India, warned worshippers to be wary of Shincheonji. "Their leader Lee Man-hee claims to have access to secret knowledge of scriptures that other church pastors do not know. Moreover, he claims that one can truly know God only by following and listening to the teachings of Shincheonji. Once they are into this group, they spend most of their time inviting people to join Shincheonji group and spend less time with their families, friends and churches and neglect and quit their studies or work."
- New Zealand – In April 2017, several local Korean churches in Auckland including the New Zealand Korean Churches Association and the Immanuel Korean Church warned their congregations that the Shincheonji was seeking to recruit members through their Bible classes, encourage members to cut family ties, and sending "harvesters" to infiltrate and take over other churches. In April 2019, several churches in Wellington including The Street Church and Blueprint Church raised concerns about the Shincheonji's methods in recruiting members from their congregations. The historian Peter Lineham also described the group's recruitment techniques as "dangerous" and "deceptive." In September 2022, Shincheonji's Auckland church hosted a visit by The New Zealand Herald journalist Lincoln Tan and historian Lineham in an effort to improve the church's public image. In November 2022, several former members alleged that the church isolated members from their families and friends, and pressured its members to proselytise. A Shincheonji spokesperson denied the group was a cult and claimed the church was misunderstood.
- Pacific Islands – In 2013, Shincheongji established an outreach in Fiji under the name "Heavenly Culture, World Peace, Restoration of Light." By late April 2023, the Shincheonji church's New Zealand branch had launched outreach programmes in the Cook Islands and Samoa. These included appearing as guests on radio station PMN Cook Islands' "Godly Hour" programme and establishing a church in Samoa called "Zion Christian Mission Centre."
- Singapore – In late February 2020, Home Affairs Minister K. Shanmugam announced that the Ministry of Home Affairs would be investigating the local Shincheonji chapter for fraudulent activities, including creating front companies and using deceptive methods to recruit young people into their sect.
- United Kingdom – In November 2016, the Church of England issued a formal alert to around 500 parishes in London about the activities of a Shincheonji affiliate known as Parachristo. Parachristo, a registered charity in the UK, runs Bible study courses in London Docklands and was using these courses to recruit members of the Church of England. "Those who become involved [in Shincheonji] gradually withdraw from friends and family and actively lie about their real lives." Further warnings were issued by Nicky Gumbel, vicar of Holy Trinity Brompton, and John Peters, rector of St Mary's Church, London.

=== Deceptive and covert evangelism ===
Shincheonji has been utilizing "fortune-telling" and "tarot reading" as methods of evangelism. They approach young people and professionals through disguised club activities, job placements, and psychological assessments. For the elderly, they offer free fortune-telling on the streets to collect personal information. Their tactics involve various forms of disguise and deception, engaging in activities that exploit religion to pursue the interests of the group, showcasing antisocial behavior.

In a related case, the Suwon District Court upheld the first instance ruling in the appeal of Lee, who had filed a "youth return lawsuit" against Shincheonji. Lee claimed that he quit his teaching job and made donations due to the church's "deceptive evangelism" and sought compensation for damages. However, the court dismissed the appeal, stating that there was no evidence of coercion or undue influence. The court recognized that Lee, as an adult, voluntarily participated in religious activities, leading to the rejection of his claims.

==== Chungnam national university general club association domination scandal ====
Students affiliated with Shincheonji took over the Chungnam National University General Club Association, monopolizing positions such as president and other executive roles for five years. Numerous irregularities were also uncovered, including designating so-called "ghost clubs" as outstanding clubs and awarding them prize money. Following these revelations, the university's General Assembly of Representatives impeached the Shincheonji-affiliated executives of the association. The university announced its intention to take action in accordance with school regulations, while the Christian community also expressed plans to issue an official protest.

=== Personal data breach ===
Shincheonji is educating its members on preparations and behavioral guidelines before holidays, including instructing them to secretly check their family members' phones. Members are told to check their parents' phones for contacts, recent call logs, text messages, and whether there are any group chats on KakaoTalk excluding them. However, accessing someone's phone or extracting information without their consent constitutes a violation of privacy (Information and Communications Network Act). Since privacy violation laws do not include family exceptions, even family members can face criminal charges for unauthorized access to someone's phone. Detailed information about prospective recruits—such as their names, ages, social security numbers, contact information, addresses, family details, relatives, friends, and personality traits—is also shared and managed in group chats. This is another example of illegal activities involving personal data breaches.

=== Administrative lawsuit ===
- The Former InSpa World Building in Jung-gu, Incheon – Shincheonji filed an administrative lawsuit with the Incheon District Court, seeking to overturn a decision by the Incheon Jung-gu Office that rejected their building construction commencement notice. The Jung-gu Office had initially approved the construction of a Shincheonji-owned building (formerly InSpa World) as a 'cultural and assembly facility,' but reversed the decision on December 7, 2023, citing public interest after strong opposition from residents. Shincheonji's appeal to the Incheon City Government was dismissed, leading them to pursue legal action in court.
- Goyang City Ilsandong-gu Pung-dong (Former) LG Logistics Center Building - The Uijeongbu District Court ruled against the plaintiff in an administrative lawsuit filed by Shincheonji, arguing that the revocation of the permit by Goyang City Hall, which was intended for the establishment of a church through a change of the building's use, was not unjust.
- Imjingak Peace Park Reservation Cancellation Incident – On October 29, 2024, Shincheonji stated the Gyeonggi Tourism Organization canceled the reservation for their planned "Graduation Ceremony for 100,000 Members" at Imjingak Peace Park in Paju, Gyeonggi Province. Shincheonji criticized the cancellation, calling it an "anti-constitutional administrative outrage" and claiming it violated the constitutional principles of religious freedom and equality. They emphasized that the cancellation disregarded the preparations for tens of thousands of attendees and an event budget of 20 billion ₩, condemning it as an abuse of administrative power by the Gyeonggi Tourism Organization and Gyeonggi Province. Shincheonji announced plans to pursue legal and administrative action in response. On November 15, 2024, Shincheonji held a large-scale rally attended by tens of thousands to protest the cancellation. Shincheonji claimed that the cancellation was made without prior consultation on the day of the event. The group demanded an apology and condemned Gyeonggi Province Governor Kim Dong-yeon and the Gyeonggi Tourism Organization for the decision. However, controversy arose as Shincheonji announced plans to collect 30,000 KRW per person in transportation fees for the protest. Additionally, despite claiming a cumulative membership of 700,000, only 40,000 people signed the petition submitted to the Gyeonggi Provincial Office, further fueling debate. Meanwhile, a Shincheonji representative was referred to the prosecution on charges of exceeding noise limits at a gathering site. Shincheonji also sparked controversy by claiming that South Korea is facing divine judgment due to this cancellation.

=== Allegations of the leader's affair ===
In 2020, Kim Nam-hee publicly revealed her extramarital affair with Shincheonji leader Lee Man-hee, releasing photos from their wedding, moments of her caring for him in the hospital, images at her parents' gravesite, couple rings, and letters. She was known within Shincheonji as the "Mother of All Nations." The relationship is said to have started around 2006, and Kim even played a key role in a performance symbolizing the "Wedding Banquet of Revelation 19" during the final event of the 6th World Peace Restoration of Light Heavenly Culture Arts Festival in 2012. She left the group in 2017.

In 2024, a former lecturer and pastor in Shincheonji, known as Ms. Gong (female, in her 50s), who joined the church in 1992 and left after being excommunicated in December 2022, publicly exposed her affair with the 93-year-old Shincheonji leader, Lee Man-hee, via YouTube. She claimed that their relationship lasted for about seven years, from the mid-1990s to the early 2000s, during her 30 years in the church. According to her, she was not the only one, as other female followers were also involved with the cult leader. Police declined to forward for prosecution a sexual assault complaint from Gong because the statute of limitations had expired.

=== Threats against former members ===
Shincheonji faced controversy for allegedly threatening and harming former members who, after leaving the group, realized its contradictions and falsehoods and exposed the truth about its practices. These former members have filed complaints with the police, reporting incidents of Shincheonji members visiting their homes to intimidate them.

=== Advertising through media outlets ===
In the past, religious organizations deemed as cults by traditional religions were often prevented from placing advertisements. However, as the media environment changed and financial pressures increased, major newspapers began to accept ads from groups labeled as cults. The Korean Church Press Association reported that in 2023, there were a total of 1,240 news reports on Shincheonji. They analyzed this heavy media presence as resulting from: 1. Shincheonji actively creating its own media outlets, 2. Shincheonji members working within media companies and influencing coverage, and 3. purchasing articles and advertisements to use as promotional tools.

=== Defamation of the deceased controversy ===
In a civil lawsuit filed against Shincheonji for allegedly defaming the late Pastor Baek Dong-seop by teaching that he was the "Destroyer" mentioned in the Book of Revelation, the court did not hold Shincheonji leader Lee Man-hee liable for damages. On October 17, 2024, the Anyang Branch of the Suwon District Court dismissed the claim brought by Baek's family, ruling that the statements did not constitute defamation of the deceased, and ordered the plaintiffs to bear the legal costs. Shincheonji, seemingly concerned about the ruling being overturned, altered the teaching of the "Destroyer Doctrine" by using pseudonyms instead of explicitly naming the seven individuals.

=== Lack of transparency and tax disputes ===
- The internal front organization of Shincheonji, IWPG (International Women's Peace Group), is under suspicion for lacking transparency as it collects donations from its members by requesting transfers to personal bank accounts and failing to provide guidance on issuing donation receipts.
- The court ruled that the National Tax Service's tax imposition was justified, citing HWPL's repeated profit generation through DVD sales to Shincheonji members and its failure to pay gift taxes on donations received from Shincheonji. HWPL's claims that the DVDs were given as a token of appreciation for donations and that it was exempt from gift tax as a cultural organization were rejected due to a lack of objective evidence and the organization's nature, which made it difficult to classify as a private diplomatic entity.
- Kim Won-guk, the leader of the Philip Tribe, which oversees Gangwon Province and parts of North Chungcheong Province, was dismissed from his long-held position due to financial misconduct, including embezzlement ranging from tens of billions to 10 billion KRW.

=== Control over internal criticism ===
Shin Hyun-wook (former education director), Lee Jae-won (former education director), Jo Dae-won (former instructor), Choi Dong-hee (former tribe leader), Gong Hee-sook (former instructor), Yoo Jun-yeol (former national youth leader), and Noh Jin-chul (former general secretary of the General Assembly) all attempted to reform Shincheonji by addressing doctrinal errors and corruption within the organization. However, they were systematically expelled in succession.

== Association with the coronavirus outbreak ==
Cases of the Shincheonji cluster

Shincheonji became involved in controversy during the COVID-19 pandemic, when an outbreak of SARS-CoV-2 infections followed from the participation of a SARS-CoV-2 infected person, "Patient 31," at the organization. A dozen Chinese members of the church from Wuhan were also connected to the Daegu Shincheonji outbreak.

In Busan, a 61-year-old Daegu resident is believed to have spread the virus and was diagnosed on February 18, 2020. At the time, the South Korean government had neither introduced social distancing nor restricted travel from China (apart from travel from the Hubei province).

On February 18, 2020, Shincheonji issued a church-wide announcement of Patient 31's confirmation and closed down its churches and affiliated buildings.

On February 20, 2020, Shincheonji's Daegu branch submitted a list of its members to the Korea Centers for Disease Control and Prevention to aid with contract-tracing.

By February 20, 2020, 53 new cases were Shincheonji attendees or their families, reaching over 300 by February 23, over half of all cases in South Korea in February. The subsequent resurgences of the virus in September 2020 and December 2020 surpassed the numbers seen during the outbreak associated with Shincheonji and accelerated at a faster rate than the spread associated with Shincheonji's Daegu branch church.

=== Privacy concerns ===
On February 24, 2020, the Korea Disease Control and Prevention Agency requested a list of all Shincheonji congregants. The list included congregants’ name, citizen registration number, address, name of place of employment, and family member information. A day after, Shincheonji submitted the list of all congregants and complied with the government's request.

There was no deadline listed in the official information request letter sent to Shincheonji for epidemiological investigation. The official request also did not ask for members’ citizen registration numbers. Despite this, officials from the Korea Disease Control and Prevention Agency requested members’ citizen registration numbers to be included in the data.

There was a day's delay in submitting information, however, as Shincheonji officials asked the Korea Disease Control and Prevention Agency about the legality of providing congregants’ citizen registration numbers and if the government will protect the congregants’ private information.

On February 25, 2020, Shincheonji officials provided the list of requested information for all of its congregants.

In the October 2020 trial of Lee Man-hee, where he was accused of not complying with epidemiological investigations, an official from the Korea Ministry of Health and Welfare acknowledged that Shincheonji officials made efforts to provide the requested congregants’ information. The conversation records between Shincheonji officials and the Agency officials show an expression of concern over privacy, not a refusal to provide information or a refusal to cooperate.

Lee's counsel argued that the request for the congregants’ citizen registration numbers had nothing to do with an epidemiological investigation.

In the initial discussion between representatives of Shincheonji and the Blue House, the Blue House official in charge of the case was made aware of Shincheonji's concerns for congregants’ safety and privacy, and the omission of information from certain congregants, such as minors and those at special risk for persecution, such as elected politicians or public officials.

The police have determined that the intention for omitting certain congregants’ information was not for the purpose of obstructing disease prevention and control efforts, but to protect the congregants of Shincheonji.

In a recorded phone conversation, Lee told the Shincheonji representative in charge of communicating with the government to provide congregant information that "since the government is doing what Shincheonji should’ve done instead, we must actively help [the government]."

Alex Azar, United States Secretary of Health and Human Services, described South Korea's approach to COVID-19 as something that "would likely not fly here in the United States" and referred to the South Korean government's authoritarian crackdown on Shincheonji as he described how South Korea "used their military and police powers to lock down that church, arrest everybody that was in contact with individuals in that church."

=== Legal battle ===
With an additional 4,000 cases of COVID-19 within two weeks, and roughly 60% of the total infections nationwide having stemmed from the church, the Seoul city government asked prosecutors to press charges against the religious group's founder and senior members for murder, causing harm, and for violating the Infectious Disease and Control Act. Interviews have occurred with all 230,000 members of the religious group and nearly 9,000 were said to be showing symptoms of the virus.

After a lawsuit was started by the Mayor of Seoul, on February 25, 2020, the Governor of Gyeonggi Province Lee Jae-myung, along with 40 officials, entered the Shincheonji headquarters office and seized about 50 computers after making a forcible entry into the headquarters. The authorities checked the list seized during the raid with the one Shincheonji had supplied, and concluded that discrepancies were minor. The Seoul City government filed legal complaints to state prosecutors against 12 leaders of the church, accusing the group of homicide, causing harm, and violating the Infectious Disease and Control Act.

After the outbreak in the Daegu church in February, 51 Shincheonji-related locations in Daegu were closed. Out of these, 14 locations have been shut down since February of this year. Shincheonji has only held online services since February. However, its buildings continue to remain closed and Shincheonji has requested for the courts to reconsider the order for building closure. Shincheonji is requesting access to the buildings for the sake of building maintenance, not for usage of religious meetings or activities. The City of Daegu, however, has rejected the request, stating that building maintenance is currently not needed and that the public opinion against Shincheonji's Daegu Church still has not recovered. The courts have not yet ruled against or for the request. The situation could also be resolved upon an agreement between Shincheonji Daegu Church and the City of Daegu.

=== Criminal charges against Lee Man-hee ===
On July 31, 2020, Lee Man-hee was arrested by South Korean authorities for allegedly hiding crucial information from contact-tracers and other offenses; by this time the Shincheonji Church was being linked to more than 5,200 coronavirus infections, or 36% of South Korea's total cases. Prosecutors specifically alleged that Lee had failed to provide health authorities with complete lists of church members in violation of South Korea's Infectious Disease Control and Prevention Act. The Vice Minister of the Ministry of Health and Welfare publicly stated that Shincheonji had cooperated with authorities.

Lee was initially detained pending trial, and several previous appeals for bail were initially rejected. However, on November 12, 2020, the court granted bail to Lee, with the court noting Lee's consistent attendance and compliance during court proceedings, as well as the health concerns of detaining a 90-year-old senior in prison.

Prosecutors sought a five-year prison sentence and a fine of ₩3 million (2021) (equivalent to ₩3 million or US$2,546 in 2025) on the Infectious Disease Control and Prevention Act charges. In January 2021, the Suwon District Court acquitted Lee of the COVID-19-related charges, ruling that lists of church members were not "key elements of epidemiological surveys" defined in the Act. However, the court, found Lee guilty of embezzling ₩5.6 billion (2021) (equivalent to ₩6.37 billion or US$4.75 million in 2025) from the church to build a home, and of using government facilities to conduct religious services, and issued a four-year suspended sentence to Lee.

The Supreme Court of Korea in 2022 affirmed the lower court's decisions: acquittal on COVID-19 charges and conviction for embezzlement.

=== Shincheonji response ===
In a press conference in early March 2020, the church's founder Lee Man-hee publicly kneeled and bowed his head to the ground in a traditional Korean gesture of apology, apologized for church members unintentionally spreading the virus, and said that the church was cooperating with the government.

In response to the negative media attention on Shincheonji, Lee Man-hee spoke publicly about being misunderstood or falsely accused. Shincheonji has been cited as the "most vilified group during pandemic."

On August 26, 2020, the Korea Centers for Disease Control and Prevention (KCDC) thanked Shincheonji for 562 of its congregation members donating plasma for COVID-19 treatment research, and requested collaboration with Shincheonji to hold a large-scale plasma donation drive from August 26, 2020, to September 4, 2020. An additional 1,100 Shincheonji members are estimated to donate plasma in collaboration with the KCDC.
