= Sweet, Sweet Blues =

- In the Heat of the Night episode
- Episode no.: Season 5 Episode 8
- Directed by: Vincent McEveety
- Written by: William J. Royce
- Original air date: December 3, 1991

Guest appearances
- Bobby Short: Chester "Ches" Collins; James Best: Nathan Bedford

"Sweet, Sweet Blues" is an episode of the NBC drama series In the Heat of the Night, starring Carroll O'Connor as Chief Bill Gillespie and Howard Rollins as Detective Virgil Tibbs. In the Heat of the Night was based on the 1965 novel by John Ball, which was also the basis for the Academy Award winning film of the same name starring Sidney Poitier and Rod Steiger, directed by Norman Jewison.

== Synopsis ==
Directed by Vincent McEveety (Firecreek) and written by William James Royce, the episode guest stars musician Bobby Short as bluesman Chester "Ches" Collins and actor James Best as Nathan Bedford. The story revolves around the forty-plus-year-old, unsolved racially motivated 1948 murder of Sergeant Willson Sweet's grandfather, Louis Sweet, a story loosely based on the 1963 murder of Mississippi civil rights activist Medgar Evers. There was a brief mention of the Sweet story in a Season Three Heat episode, "An Angry Woman".

Although the crime went unsolved and the elder Sweet's body was never found, there was a witness, a young black man named Ches Collins, but being afraid to share what he saw, he remained silent for all these years. Ches, now as an old man, is determined to see that justice is done, even if it has been delayed all these years.

Sergeant Willson Sweet (Geoffrey Thorne) of the Sparta police department frequents the nightclub numerous times to hear the bluesman Collins perform "The Bad Sweet Blues"—a song recounting his family history—which catches the young officer's attention. The tune tells how Sweet’s grandfather, Louis, won a luxury Packard automobile in a New Orleans card game and refused to be intimidated by local racists who warned him against flaunting it in Sparta, Mississippi.

On November 1, 1948, Louis Sweet went missing in Sparta. Although newspaper reports falsely claimed three unknown Black men killed him and stole his car, the crime was actually committed by three white men who were never prosecuted. The song, written by series star Carroll O'Connor and performed by Bobby Short, names those responsible—now dead or near death—prompting Sweet's heroic quest to bring his grandfather's aging killer to justice before he dies with the secret.

The retired sheriff in the story, Nathan "Nate" Bedford, was intentionally named after Confederate general and the first Ku Klux Klan Grand Wizard, Nathan Bedford Forrest. In the episode, an aging Bedford is remorseful for participating in the lynching of Sweet’s grandfather and seeks forgiveness, though he was not the actual gunman.

First, Sweet and Detective Virgil Tibbs (Howard Rollins) question Collins at his home about the song's origins. Collins confirms he witnessed the lynching and wrote the song, but refuses to reveal any further details.

Delbert Mueller, a dying racist who was the "witness" to seeing these non-existent black men, admits on his deathbed to Chief Gillespie that his original report to the sheriff's department about Louis Sweet's disappearance was a lie and he saw him killed, though he refused to implicate himself further.

Sweet and fellow officer Lieutenant Jamison (Hugh O'Connor) question retired sheriff Bedford, who claims to have no memory of the incident. Unconvinced, the officers ask Gillespie to speak to his friend Bedford privately in hopes of getting the truth.

Gillespie goes to speak to him at a playground, where Bedford frequents to read his Bible on a daily basis to cope with past guilt. Gillespie asks if Mueller ever killed anyone, Louis Sweet in particular—and Bedford reluctantly confirms it.

Following clues in the song's lyrics, Virgil, Gillespie, Sweet, and Althea (Anne-Marie Johnson) watch Collins perform at the nightclub one evening. Collins then reveals to them what he witnessed forty-three years ago: Bedford, another man, Jay Boyd, and Delbert Mueller were all present in the woods—Mueller was the one who shot and killed Louis Sweet. They buried the body beneath what would eventually become the playground decades later and where a swing set would be erected.

Virgil, Gillespie, Sweet, and Collins locate the area where the remains are at the park, where Virgil photographs Sweet standing over his grandfather's hidden grave. Sweet presents the photo to Bedford, exposing his complicity in the murder. Sweet coldly invites him to pray with him at the playground, but it's an hollow invitation—denying him the forgiveness and absolution he seeks. Leaving Bedford shaken and near tears, Sweet walks away, leaving him to face ultimate divine judgment for his sins.

The episode concludes with Sweet deciding to leave his grandfather's remains undisturbed in a peaceful sanctuary where children of all backgrounds play together, free from the divisions of race.

That season, In the Heat of the Night won its first NAACP Image Award for Outstanding Dramatic Series and James Best won the Crystal Reel Award for Best Actor.

== Production notes ==
The inspiration for the episode is taken from the true life story of civil rights activist Medgar Evers who was murdered in front of his home in Jackson, Mississippi on June 12, 1963. Although it was widely known that Evers was shot by white supremacist and Klansman Byron De La Beckwith, in 1991, when this story was written, Beckwith had apparently gotten away with murder.

In 1994, thirty years after the two previous trials had failed to reach a verdict, De La Beckwith was again brought to trial based on new evidence, and Bobby DeLaughter took on the job as the prosecutor. An aging Klansman who had heard De La Beckwith brag about the killing felt compelled, after all these years, to come forward and give testimony in a court of law. De La Beckwith was convicted of murder on February 5, 1994, after having lived as a free man for much of the three decades following the killing. He appealed, unsuccessfully, and died in prison at the age of 80, in January 2001.

== In popular culture ==
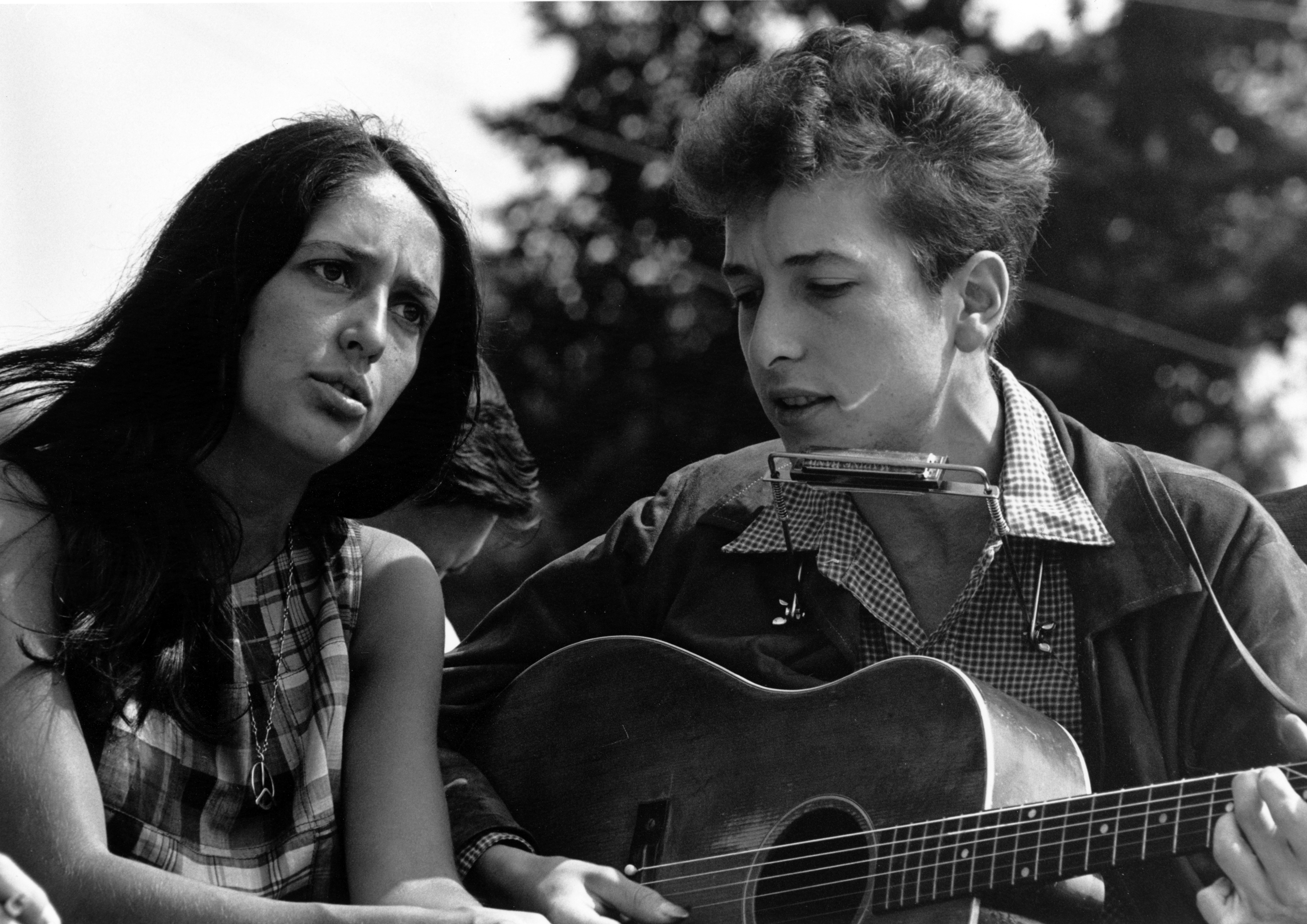
Bob Dylan with Joan Baez during the civil rights "March on Washington" August 28, 1963

The Medgar Evers story has inspired numerous works of art, including literature, music, and film, helping to assure that his legacy endures.

Musician Bob Dylan wrote his 1963 song "Only a Pawn in Their Game" about the assassination of Medgar Evers. On August 28, 1963, at the historic “March on Washington,” Dylan sang “Only A Pawn in Their Game” at the Lincoln Memorial – where Dr. Martin Luther King made his famous “I Have A Dream” speech.

Medgar's widow, Myrlie Evers co-wrote the book For Us, the Living with William Peters in 1967. This book is the basis for the 1983 award-winning PBS biopic.

For Heat actor Howard Rollins, this was the second project relating to the slain civil rights worker. In 1983, Rollins starred in For Us the Living: The Medgar Evers Story, a made-for-television biopic that aired on PBS's American Playhouse. The movie won the prestigious Writers Guild of America award for Best Adapted Drama, and netted Rollins the NAACP Image Award for Outstanding Actor in a Television Movie, Mini-Series or Dramatic Special in 1983.

In 1996, director Rob Reiner's film Ghosts of Mississippi was released. The film, starring Alec Baldwin, Whoopi Goldberg and James Woods, details the 1994 trial and subsequent conviction of Beckwith.
