= Botnick =

Botnick is a surname. Notable people with this surname include:

- Aaron Botnick (born 1984), American ISEF winner and namesake of the minor planet 11228 Botnick
- Adolph Botnick (1924–1995), Jewish-American civil rights activist
- Bruce Botnick (born 1945), American record producer

== See also ==
- 11228 Botnick, minor planet
