= National Emancipation of our White Seed =

The National Emancipation of our White Seed party was an extremist Christian Identity group founded and led by Reverend Dewey H "Buddy" Tucker in the early 1970s. It was officially incorporated by Tucker in the State of Tennessee on April 12, 1976. The party's Christian Identity platform, which the core beliefs state that only the white race has souls, advocates Segregation, White Separatism, Racialism, Antisemitism, and Anti Taxation. Individuals and organizations that have aligned with the "National Emancipation of our White Seed" include the Ku Klux Klan, National States' Rights Party, Byron De La Beckwith, Richard Butler, and Dan Gayman.

== Extremist Activities Affiliations ==
Throughout the 1970s the "National Emancipation of our White Seed" (N.E.W.S). spoke at Ku Klux Klan rallies, NSRP conventions and other extremist gatherings as an advocate for the Christian Identity movement. Christian Identity "influence ranges from Ku Klux Klan and neo-Nazi groups to the anti-government militia and sovereign citizen movements." Byron De La Beckwith associated himself with the party while delivering speeches with Tucker at an NSRP convention.

Dan Gayman became affiliated with the N.E.W.S and also assisted in the publication of its anti-Semitic publication, The Battle Axe News. Later, both Tucker and Gayman conducted a tour of the west coast, at which time Tucker became associated with Richard Butler. Butler aligned his own church with the N.E.W.S. in 1976 before forming the Aryan Nations.

On June 3, 1976, in Schell City MO., Tucker and Gayman, along with 34 other individuals, forced their way into the church Gayman's brother, Duane Gayman, as the "National Emancipation of our White Seed." This altercation was the result over Duane Gayman's split from Dan Gayman's increasingly extremist congregation. A clash with police occurred and Tucker, Gayman along with 10 others were arrested for trespassing.

=== Dissolution ===
The party was dissolved by 1987.
