= USNS Medgar Evers =

Cargo ship of the United States Navy

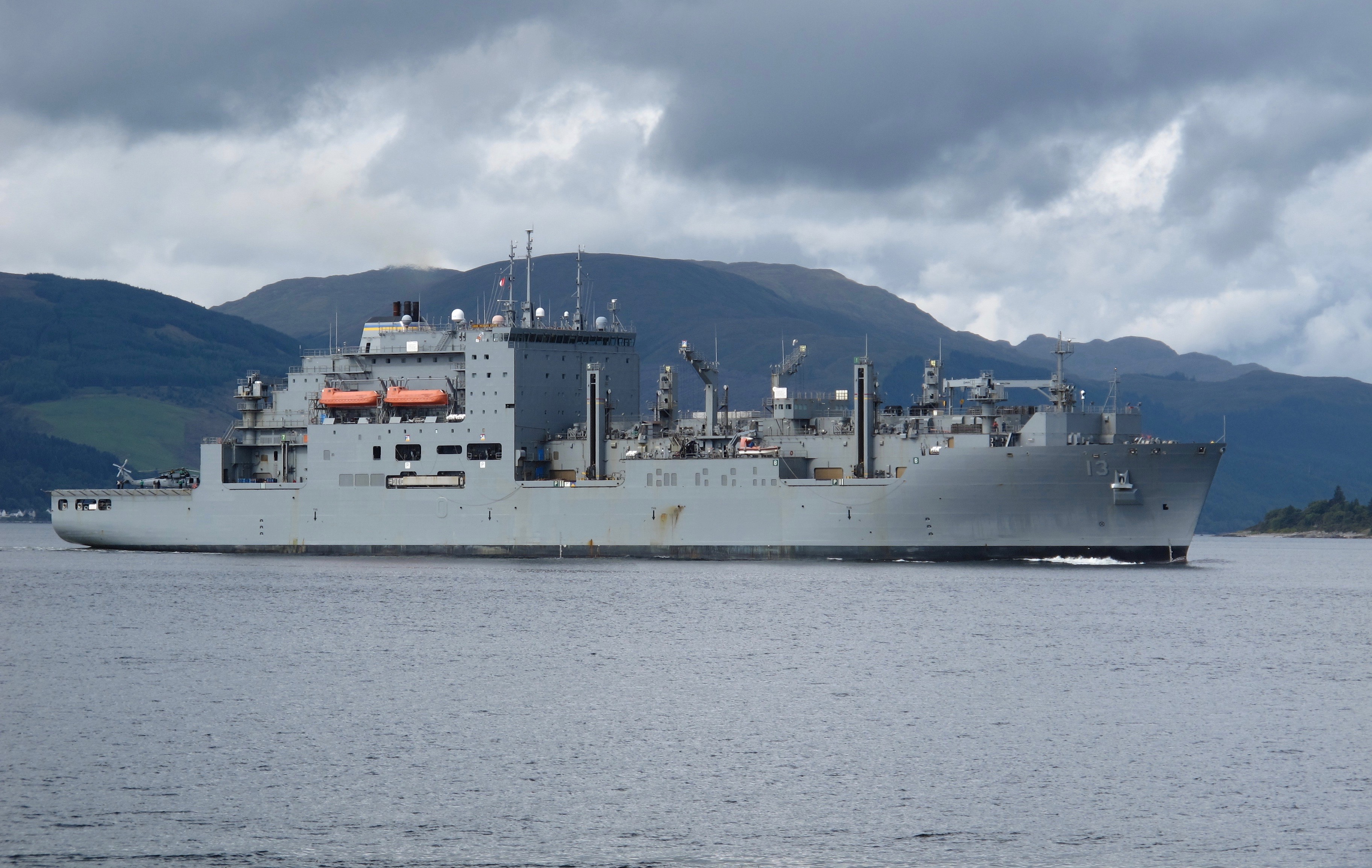
- Medgar Evers on the Firth of Clyde, 2018

History
- Namesake: Medgar Evers
- Builder: National Steel and Shipbuilding
- Laid down: 26 October 2010
- Launched: 29 October 2011
- Sponsored by: Myrlie Evers-Williams
- Christened: 12 November 2011
- In service: 24 April 2012
- Identification: IMO number: 9593115; MMSI number: 369928000; Callsign: NVRS
- Status: Active service
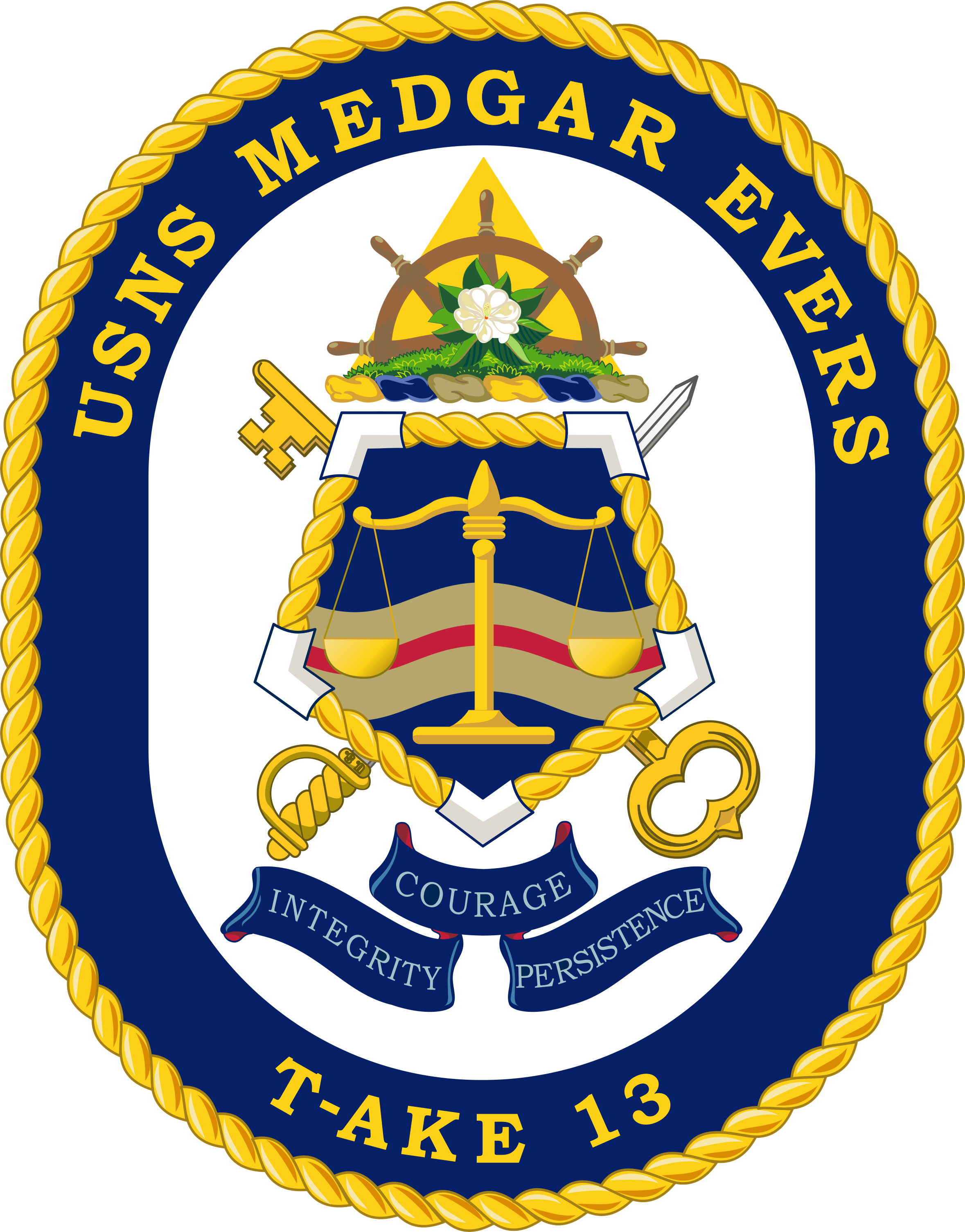
- Badge

General characteristics
- Class & type: Lewis and Clark-class dry cargo ship
- Tonnage: Gross 43,758; Net 13,127
- Displacement: 25,254 metric tons light; 44,776 metric tons fully loaded
- Length: 689 ft (210 m)
- Beam: 106 ft (32 m)
- Draft: 32 ft (10 m) maximum
- Installed power: 4 x Fairbanks Morse/MAN 48/60 diesel generators
- Propulsion: 2 x 11,262 HP Alstom electric motors; 1 fixed pitch propeller
- Speed: 20 kn (37 km/h)
- Range: 14,000 nmi (26,000 km) at 20 kn (37 km/h)
- Capacity: Max dry cargo weight: 6,675 short tons (6,055 t); Max cargo fuel volume: 1,048,300 US gal (3,968 m^{3})
- Complement: 49 military, 123 civilian
- Aircraft carried: 2 × helicopters, Sikorsky MH-60S Seahawk or equivalent
- Aviation facilities: 1 helipad, 2 hangars

USNS Medgar Evers (T-AKE-13) is a Lewis and Clark-class dry cargo ship of the United States Navy. As part of the Navy's Combat Logistics Force, her mission is to deliver ammunition, provisions, dry stores, refrigerated food, spare parts, potable water, and diesel and jet fuel to U.S. Navy and allied ships while at sea. The ship is named for civil rights movement activist Medgar Evers, a World War II veteran who was assassinated in 1963. The Navy announced the naming on 9 October 2009.

== Construction and characteristics ==
National Steel and Shipbuilding Company (NASSCO) was awarded a detailed design and construction contract for the Lewis and Clark-class in October 2001. They received a follow-on contract for the final two ships in the class, including Medger Evers, in 2010. Medgar Evers was the thirteenth ship of the class built by NASSCO at their San Diego shipyard. Construction began in April 2010 and her keel was laid on 26 October 2010. Gina Buzby, wife of Rear Admiral Mark Buzby, Military Sealift Command commander, was the keel-laying ceremony honoree.

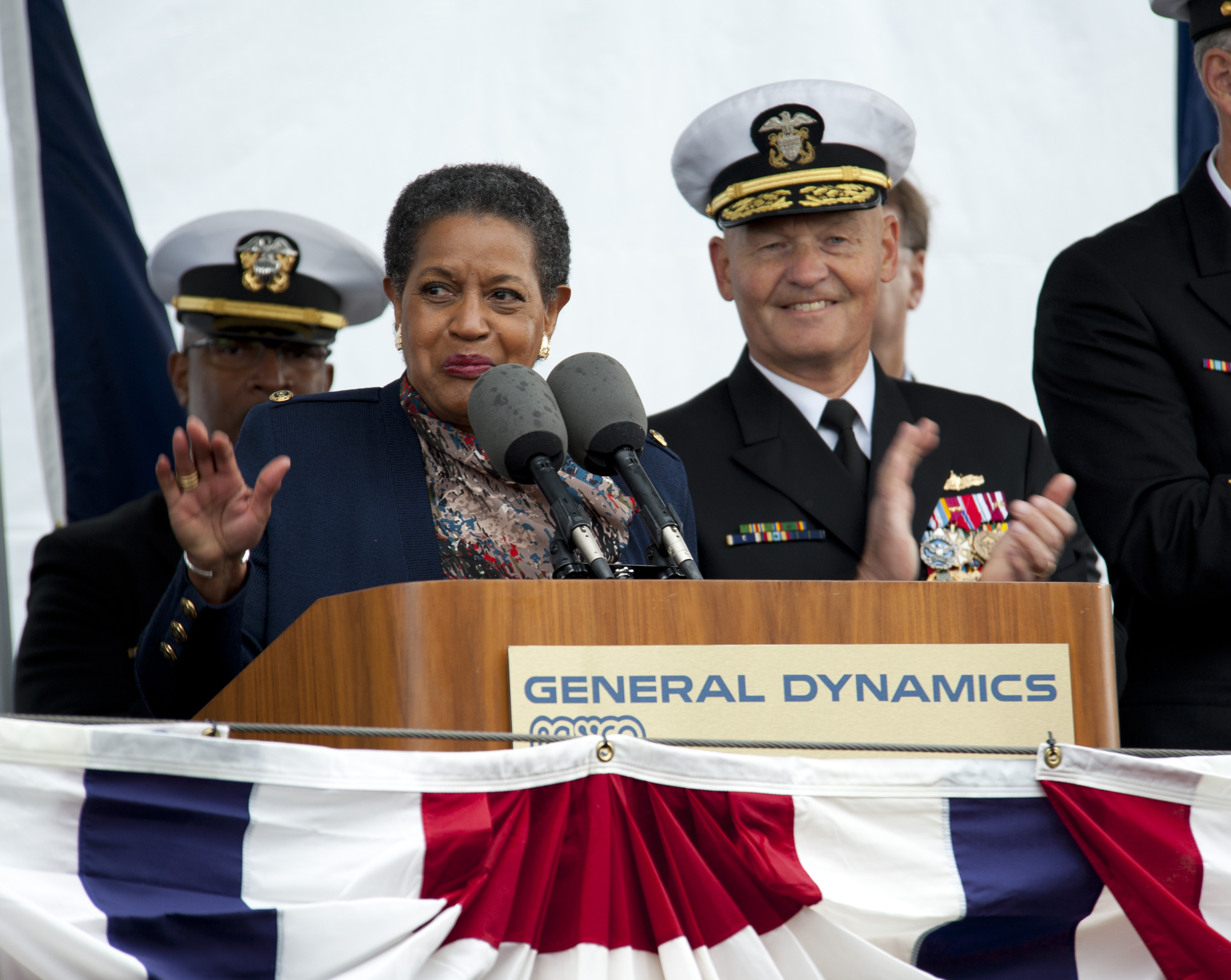
Myrlie Evers speaking at USNS Medgar Evers' christening ceremony

Medgar Evers was launched on 29 October 2011. She was christened on 12 November 2011 by Evers' widow, Myrlie Evers-Williams. The ceremony was attended by Secretary of the Navy Ray Mabus, Admiral Buzby, Rear Admiral David H. Lewis, and Reena Denise Evers-Everette, Medger Evers' daughter. Military Sealift Command accepted delivery of Medgar Evers on 24 April 2012.

Both the hull and superstructure of Medgar Evers are constructed of welded steel plate. Her hull has a double bottom to comply with anti-pollution laws. The ship is 689 feet (210 m) long, with a beam of 106 feet (32 m), and a fully loaded draft of 32 feet (9.8 m). Her light displacement is 25,254 metric tons, and fully loaded the ship displaces 44,776 metric tons. Her construction meets American Bureau of Shipping standards and is periodically inspected by the United States Coast Guard. The ship's gross registered tonnage is 43,758, and her net tonnage is 13,127.

While Medgar Evers is, for the most part, built to commercial standards, she exceeds American Bureau of Shipping requirements in a number of areas which would be important for operation in hostile environments. These include an advanced degaussing system, chemical agent detection, enhanced fire-fighting capabilities, emergency power and communications systems, and an acoustic torpedo deception device. She has space and weight reservations in her design for self-defense weapons systems, should they be required in the future.

The ship can cruise at 20 knots. She is propelled by a single five-bladed, fixed-pitch propeller, which is driven by two Alstom electric motors each producing 11,262 brake horsepower. Electric power for the motors and the rest of the ship is generated by four Fairbanks Morse/MAN 48/60 diesel generators which can produce up to 35.7 MW. She has a bow thruster to improve maneuverability.

Medger Evers' fuel tanks have a capacity of 4,801.1 cubic metres (1,268,300 US gal) of diesel fuel. She has an unrefueled range of 14,000 nautical miles at 20 knots. Her five cargo tanks can hold up to 3,968.1 cubic metres (1,048,300 US gal) of diesel fuel for ships or JP-5 jet fuel for planes, or a combination of the two commodities. She also has a cargo tank for potable water which can hold up to 201 cubic metres (53,000 US gal).

Her two main cargo holds can accommodate a total of 6,675 short tons of dry goods in 591,555 cubic feet. Her main refrigerated cargo hold stores 1,716 short tons of food in 140,000 cubic feet. In addition, the ship has numerous specialty storage areas for a wide variety of materials needed by the fleet. Spare parts is the largest category, but the ship also has storage areas for medical supplies, fuzes, primers, and detonators, pyrotechnics, flammable liquids, mail, and other materials. These specialty storage areas include 208,357 cubic feet. In addition to the storage areas, the ship has several open areas to allow for material handling. There are eight elevators aboard to move cargo from the holds to the main deck or flight deck, from whence they can be transferred to other ships.

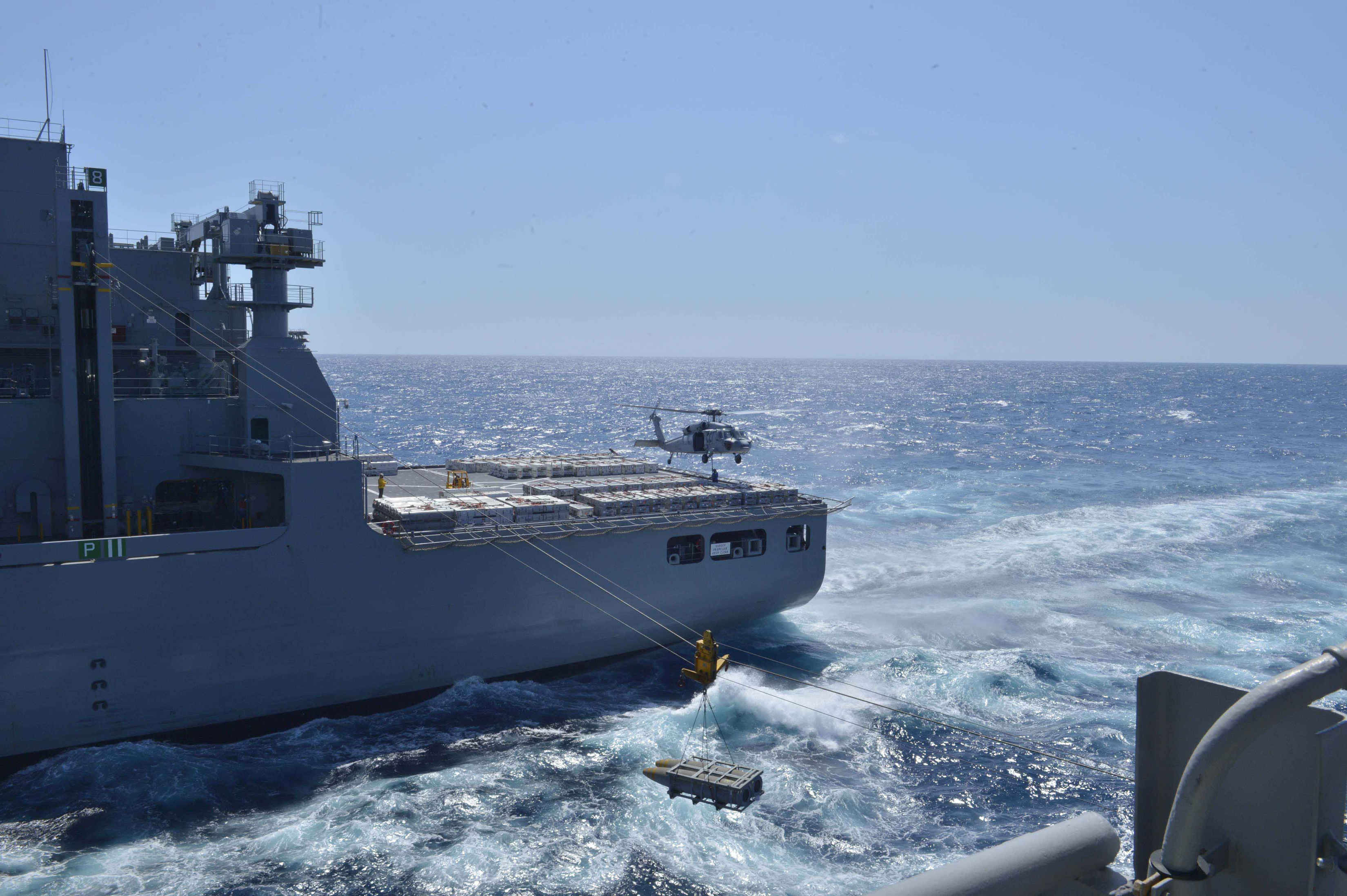
USNS Medgar Evers transferring ordnance to USS Theodore Roosevelt by connected and vertical replenishment

Medgar Evers has three dry cargo and one liquid cargo connected-replenishment ("conrep") stations on each side allowing her to supply ships on either side or both sides simultaneously. She has four cranes for loading and unloading while in port. The ship has a helicopter landing pad on her stern and hangar capacity for two embarked helicopters. These are used for vertical replenishment ("vertrep"), moving goods from Medgar Evers to other ships by helicopter.

Medger Evers has a civilian, unionized, crew of US Coast Guard-licensed mariners. In addition, she supports a detachment of active-duty military personnel, which focus on communications and supply. When helicopters are embarked, additional Navy personnel sail with the ship. Her accommodations can house up to 197 personnel. Although her crew varies depending on her activities, a normal complement is 123 civilian mariners and 49 naval personnel, including a helicopter detachment.

== Operating history ==
In 2013 Medgar Evers participated in Operation Atalanta, supporting U.S. and allied warships on anti-piracy patrol in the Gulf of Aden. Medgar Evers participated in Exercise Joint Warrior, a large NATO training exercise in the North Atlantic, in 2015, 2017, 2019, and 2020. In 2015 the ship supported the U.S. Southern Command's annual humanitarian mission, Operation Continuing Promise. The ship supported Operation Inherent Resolve, an effort to combat ISIS, in Middle East waters in 2016 and 2018.

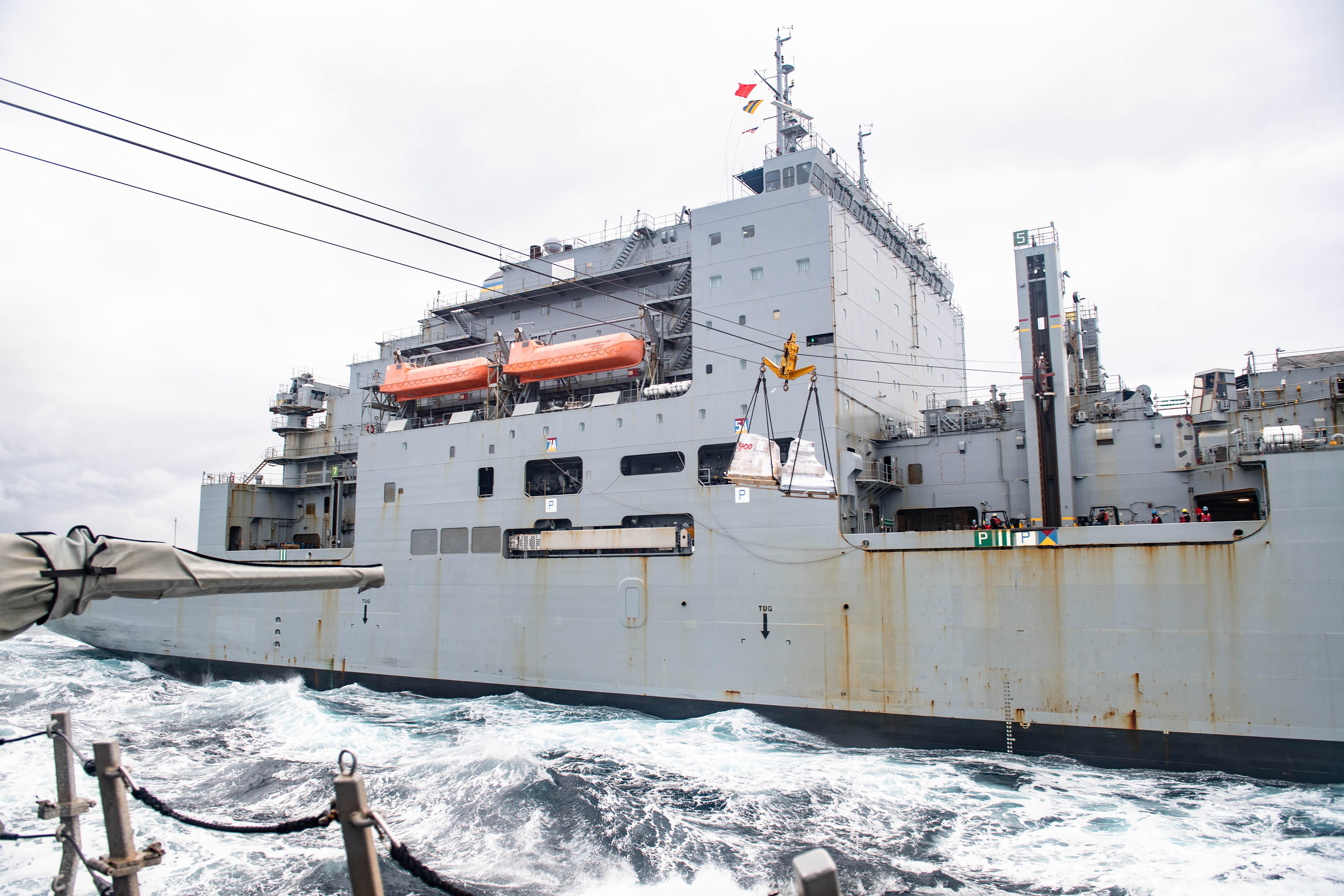
USNS Medger Evers delivering supplies to USS Ross (DDG-71) in 2020

Medgar Evers has supported a number of Composite Training Unit Exercises, when she worked with a carrier strike group or an amphibious ready group to prepare for overseas deployment. She played this role with the USS Bataan (LHD-5) readiness group in 2013, the USS George H.W. Bush strike group in 2016, and the USS Dwight D. Eisenhower strike group in 2021.

On 25 February 2019, Medger Evers deployed to the Mediterranean. On this occasion she sailed with two Sikorsky MH-60S Seahawk helicopters of Sea Combat Squadron 22 to support vertical replenishment operations. During this mission she took part in three Sixth Fleet training exercises including Joint Warrior 2019, Formidable Shield 2019, and Baltic Operations 2019.

Medgar Evers spent the last four months of 2020 in the Mediterranean. She conducted 31 underway replenishments with U.S. Sixth Fleet, supplying 3.6 million gallons of diesel fuel, and 980 pallets of dry goods to U.S., French, Greek, Italian, Spanish, and Royal Navy warships. She participated in Joint Warrior 2020 and supported a new Royal Navy carrier strike group based on HMS Queen Elizabeth.

Medger Evers earned the MSC "E" for excellence award in 2020 and 2021.
