= Medgar Evers Historic District =

- Medgar Evers Historic District; Elraine Subdivision
- U.S. National Register of Historic Places
- U.S. Historic district
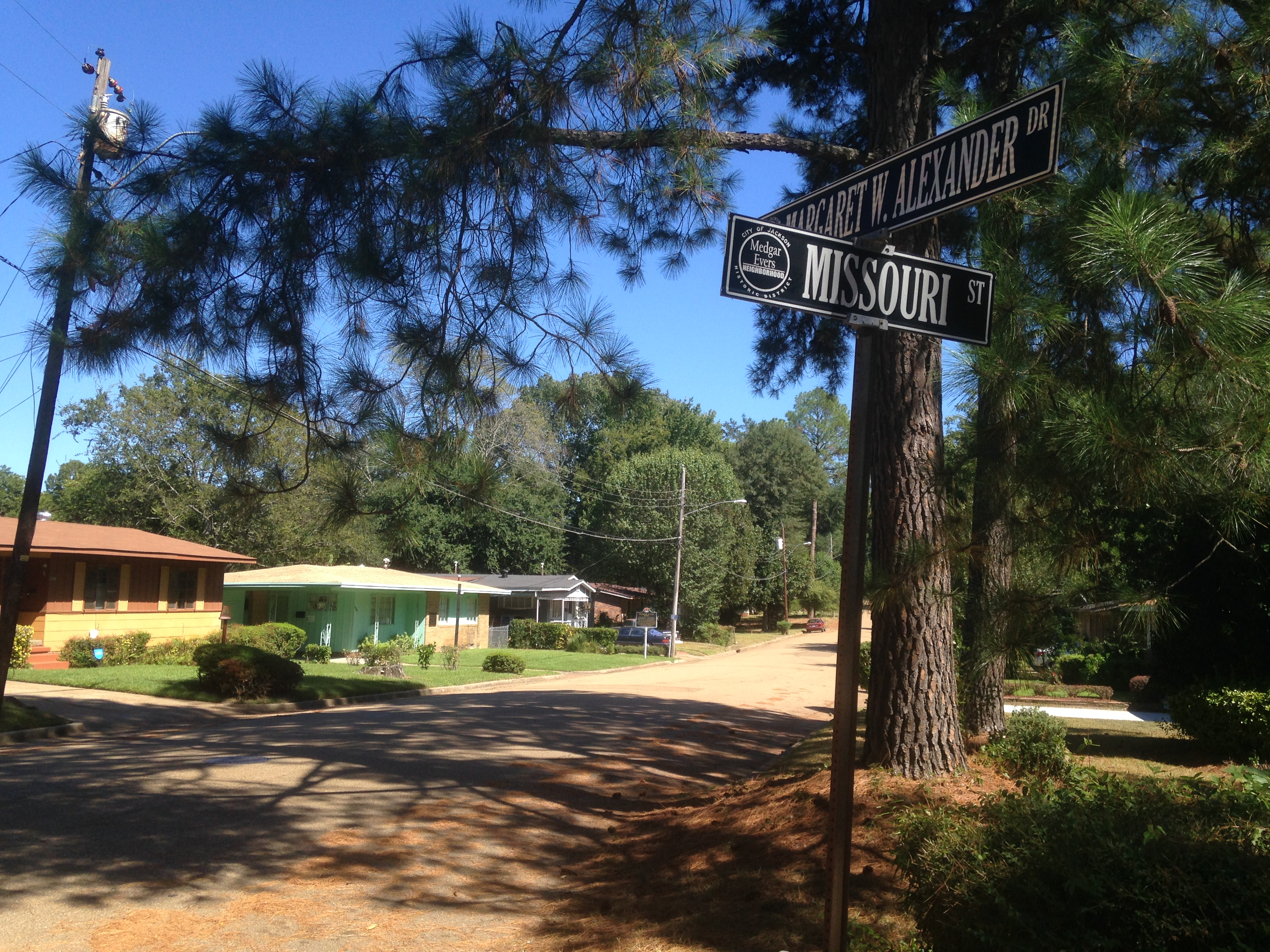

- Location within Mississippi Location within the United States
- Location: Roughly Margaret Walker Alexander Street, W. of Missouri and E. of Miami Streets, Jackson, Hinds County, Mississippi, U.S.
- Coordinates: 32.341°N 90.2127°W
- NRHP reference No.: 13000737
- Added to NRHP: September 18, 2013

Medgar Evers Historic District is a U.S. historic district and residential neighborhood in Jackson, Mississippi. The neighborhood contains the Medgar and Myrlie Evers Home National Monument, the former home of African American civil rights activist Medgar Evers (1925–1963). Poet and writer Margaret Abigail Alexander Walker (1915–1998) lived in the neighborhood, and has a street named after her. The district is roughly bound by Margaret Walker Alexander Street, W. of Missouri and E. of Miami Streets, and is 3 miles northwest from downtown Jackson. The district has been listed as one of the National Register of Historic Places (NRHP) since September 18, 2013.

== History ==
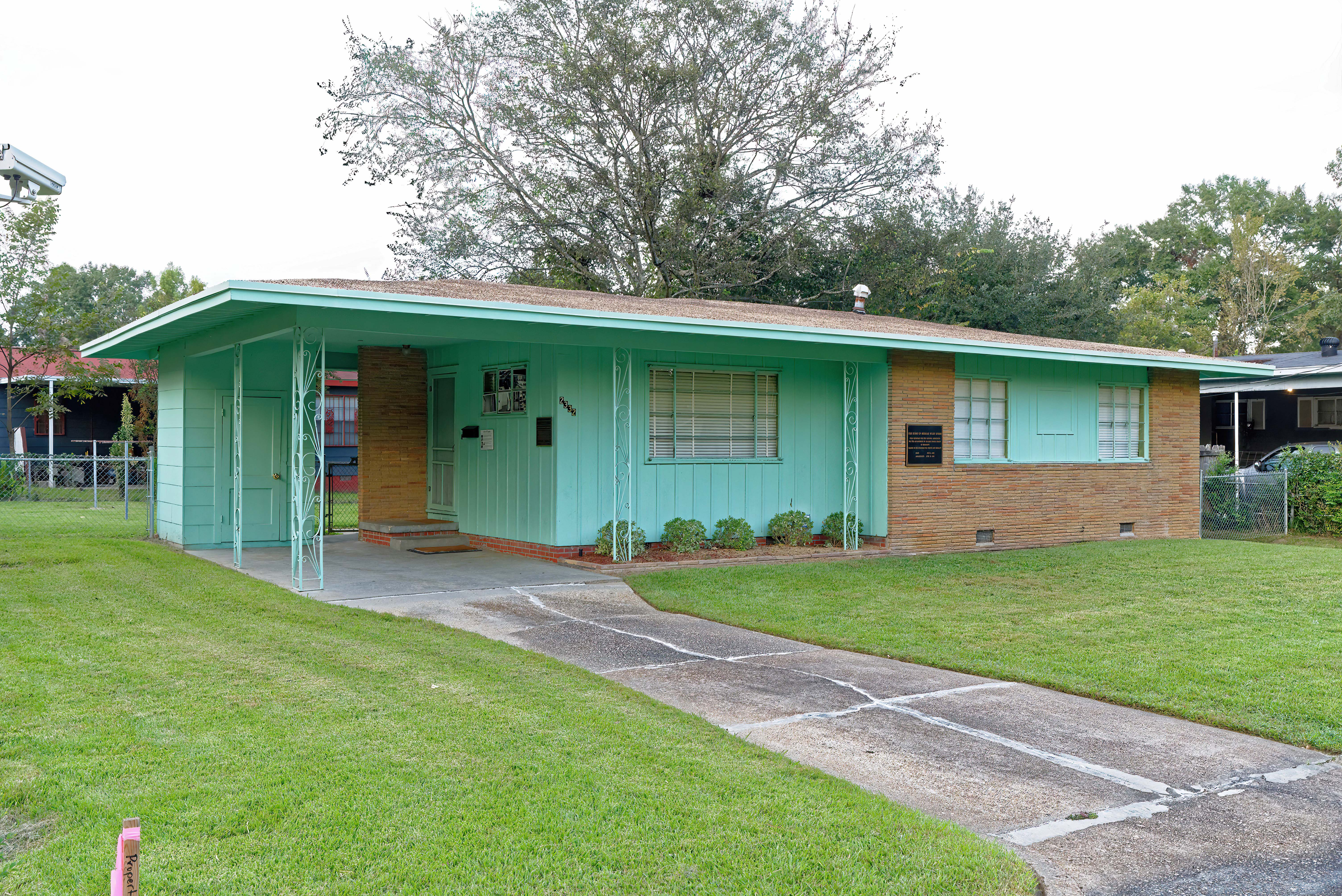
Medgar and Myrlie Evers Home (2018) at 2332 Margaret Walker Alexander Drive, Jackson, Mississippi

The area was developed between 1955 and 1957 by African American developers Winston J. Thompson and Leroy Burnett, and was known as the Elraine Subdivision. It was the first modern subdivision designed specifically for middle-class Blacks in Mississippi after World War II. To sell the houses, Thompson and Burnett advertised in the Jackson Advocate, a local African American newspaper. They were all designed as three bedrooms, a large bath, central heat, attached storage room, and landscaped lawns. It is listed as one of the NRHP historic districts because of the architecture, Black ethnic heritage, and its social history.

The neighborhood contains 44 properties, primarily 1950s Ranch-style homes; and was designed as a suburban development. There is not much variance in the architecture.

In more recent history the community has struggled with blight.

== Architectural landmarks ==
- Margaret Walker Alexander House (1955), 2205 Margaret Walker Alexander Drive (formerly 2205 Guynes Street), Jackson, Mississippi
- Medgar and Myrlie Evers Home National Monument (1956), 2332 Margaret Walker Alexander Drive (formerly 2332 Guynes Street), Jackson, Mississippi
- Greater Mount Mariah Missionary Baptist Church (c. 1956; formerly Elraine Baptist Church), 3672 Medgar Evers Boulevard, Jackson, Mississippi

== See also ==
- National Register of Historic Places listings in Hinds County, Mississippi
- Edwards Heights Historic District in Oklahoma City, Oklahoma; a similar social history
