= For Us the Living: The Medgar Evers Story =

1983 American biographical film

- Genre: Drama
- Based on: For Us, the Living by Myrlie Evers-Williams; William Peters
- Written by: Ossie Davis; J. Rotcop
- Directed by: Michael Schultz
- Starring: Howard Rollins; Irene Cara; Margaret Avery; Roscoe Lee Browne
- Music by: Gerald Fried
- Country of origin: United States
- Original language: English

Production
- Executive producer: Charles W. Fries
- Producer: Ken Rotcop
- Cinematography: Alan Kozlowski
- Editors: Harry Keramidas; Thomas Penick
- Running time: 90 min.
- Production company: Charles Fries Productions

Original release
- Network: PBS
- Release: March 22, 1983

For Us the Living: The Medgar Evers Story is a 1983 American made-for-television biographical film based on the 1967 book, For Us, the Living, by Myrlie Evers-Williams and William Peters. It was broadcast on the PBS television program American Playhouse on March 22, 1983.

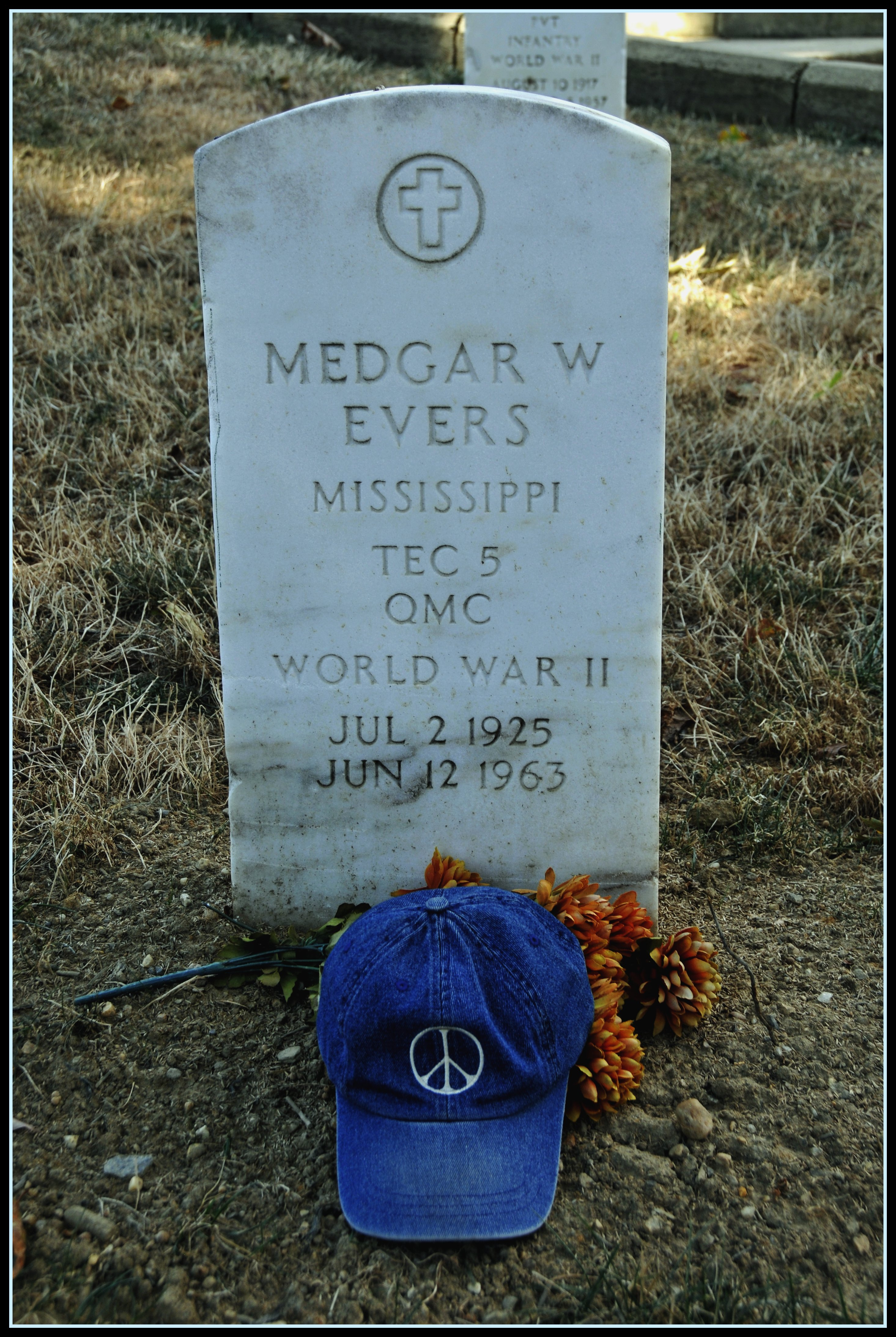
Medgar Evers' gravesite

== Plot ==
Howard Rollins stars as the assassinated NAACP civil rights activist Medgar Evers, while Irene Cara co-stars as his wife (and future NAACP chairperson) Myrlie. The film concentrates on Medgar Evers, an ex-insurance agent turned activist, in the final years of his life as the first NAACP field secretary in Mississippi. In 1954, he is involved in a boycott against white merchants and was instrumental in eventually desegregating the University of Mississippi in 1962. His home in Jackson, Mississippi is besieged by bigots, and he and his family are threatened with dire consequences. Myrlie Evers with her children were often at home alone when fire bombs and bricks were thrown against their home and through their windows. However, The Everses continued to work towards the goal of integrating the racially polarized. Medgar Evers truly believed The Constitution to include the rights within were for each American citizen, no matter color, age, class or education. On June 12, 1963, the 37-year-old Medgar Evers is shot to death in front of his home by white supremacist Byron De La Beckwith.

== Cast ==
Actor	Role
Howard Rollins	Medgar Evers
Irene Cara	Myrlie Evers
Margaret Avery	Dottie
Roscoe Lee Browne	Gloster Current
Laurence Fishburne	Jimbo Collins
Paul Winfield	Sampson
Janet MacLachlan	Mildred
Selema Perry Berry	Community Member in Church

- Location: The scene where Medgar Evers solicit community leaders and community members to sign the first petition, actually was filmed in an Atlanta, Georgia Church Located on 470 Whitehall Street: Denson Temple Peoples Free Methodist Church.
- The Cast Member Selema Perry Berry was a member of Denson Temple Peoples Free Methodist Church as Superintendent of Sunday School. She sat on the back row with her Pastor Rev. James Brown.

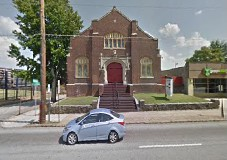
The Denson Temple Peoples Free Methodist Church

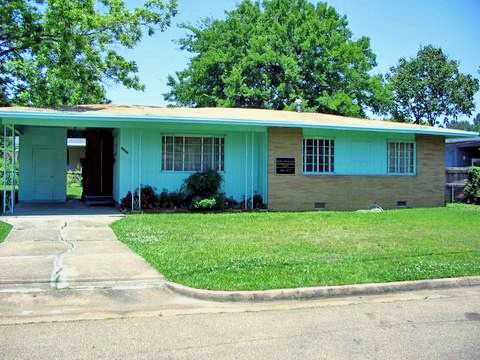
Home depicted in For Us The Living, where Evers and his family lived, is now the Medgar and Myrlie Evers Home National Monument.

== Awards ==
Year	Result	Award	Category	Recipient
1983	Winner	NAACP Image Award	Outstanding Actor in a Television Movie, Mini-Series or Dramatic Special	Howard Rollins

Year	Result	Award	Category	Recipient
1984	Winner	Writers Guild of America Award	Adapted Drama Anthology	Ossie Davis and J. Rotcop

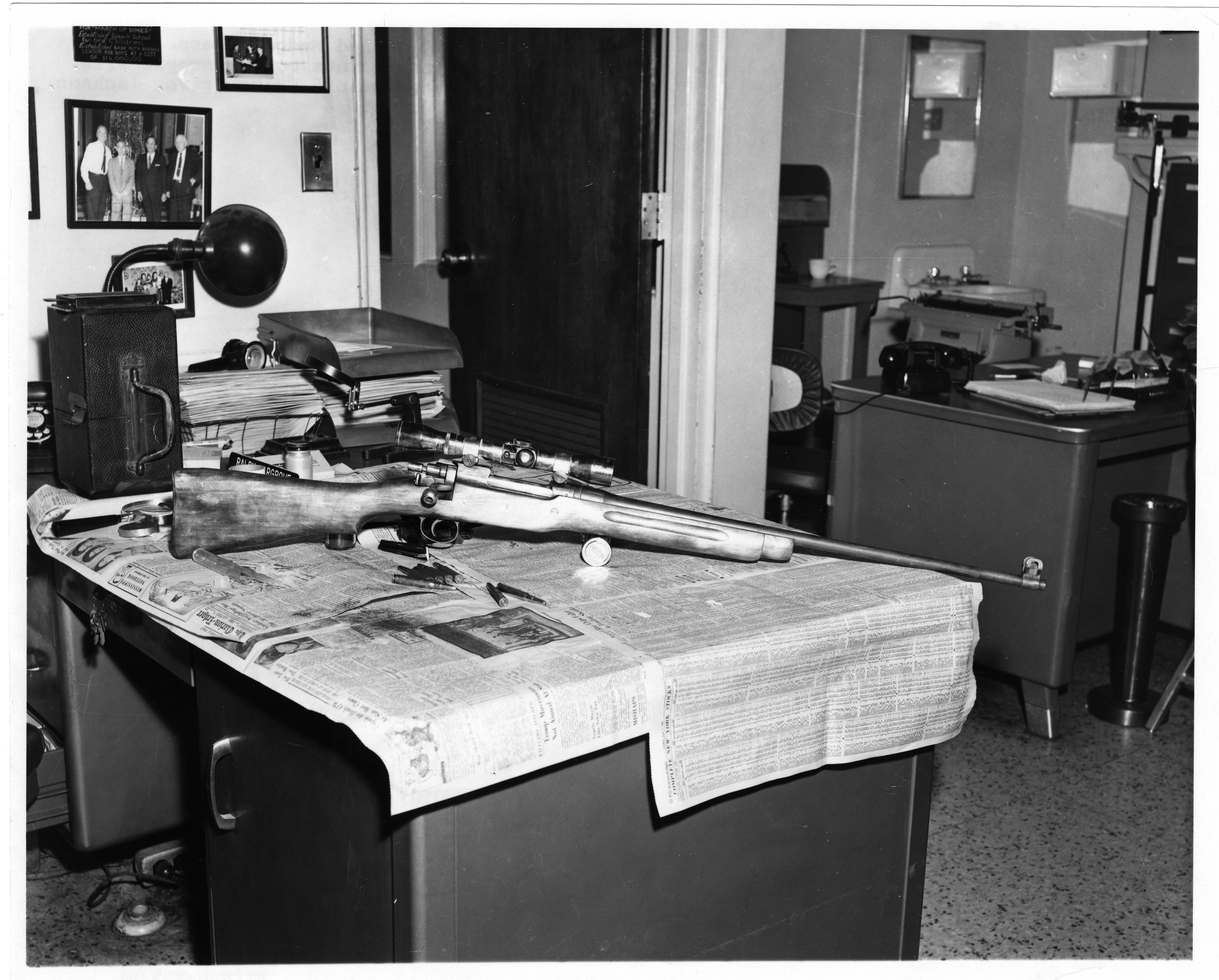
June 13, 1963, the rifle used to kill Medgar Evers contained latent fingerprints on the telescopic site. Evers was shot off Delta Drive, Jackson, Mississippi

== See also ==
- Civil rights movement in popular culture
