= William James Royce =

American dramatist

- Occupations: Playwright/Director; Screenwriter; Novelist
- Writing career
- Genres: Comedy, Mystery

I Know Why the Caged Pig Oinks ~ And Other Love Stories
- Author: William James Royce
- Language: English
- Genre: Humor
- Publication date: 2012
- Publication place: United States
- Pages: 140
- ISBN: 978-1-46999-737-7

William James Royce is an American playwright/director, screenwriter, and novelist.

== Career ==
=== Television ===
William Royce began his television career writing for the NBC television series In the Heat of the Night, starring Emmy Award winning actor Carroll O'Connor as Chief William O. Gillespie and Academy Award nominee Howard Rollins as Detective Virgil Tibbs. Royce wrote 22 episodes while serving as Executive Story Editor, a position he inherited from writer Matt Harris (Carroll O'Connor). In 1991, Royce wrote the screenplay, as well as the music and lyrics, for the award-winning episode entitled, Sweet, Sweet Blues, inspired by the real life saga of Medgar Evers. That season In the Heat of the Night won its first NAACP Image Award for Outstanding Dramatic Series. In 1994, after the seventh season, Royce left the show to write for Dick Van Dyke on the mystery series Diagnosis: Murder, and later for the Emmy Award winning mystery series Murder, She Wrote starring Angela Lansbury as mystery writer and amateur detective Jessica Fletcher.

=== Theatre ===
William Royce's first full-length play as writer/director was the romantic comedy A Fine Romance which had its world premiere in Los Angeles at the Actor's Theatre in 1984. In her critique, Polly Warfield of Back Stage West wrote, "Well, just go ahead and revel... Glamour, airy sophistication, elan, romance: If you like this sort of thing, this is the sort of thing you like. What more does anyone need?"

Royce's most recent production was his adaptation of the classic Pierre Beaumarchais comedy The Marriage of Figaro entitled, One Mad Day! which premiered at the Norton Clapp Theatre in 2008. The adaptation saw numerous changes to the original five-act play, altering its structure to three acts, updating the dialogue and presenting the new production as a "screwball comedy." In classic screwball comedy tradition, Suzanne has been made the central character. Although Figaro is still in the employ of the Count, he has been promoted from valet to Jester. Perhaps the biggest change comes in the third act when Figaro's Gypsy family arrive for "Figgie's" wedding!

=== Literature ===
William Royce's first collection of humorous essays, short stories, sketches and cartoons entitled, I Know Why the Caged Pig Oinks ~ And Other Love Stories was published by Chanticleer Publishing in May 2012. The book is dedicated to the memory of Royce's childhood friend, James Whearty. As stated on the dust-jacket: When the author learned that his childhood friend had ALS, he offered to do anything he could to help. “Write,” Jim replied. “Make me laugh.” This book, representing the comic side of Tuesdays with Morrie, is the author's attempt to repay his friend for a lifetime of laughter.

Royce's first novel, The Immaculate Deception, A Tom Sullivan Mystery, was published in September 2011. This neo-noir mystery series features ex-cop turned private investigator Tom Sullivan and his cat, Stella. The story begins in the confessional booth of a church in Southern California as Tom Sullivan makes what appears to be his final confession. Quickly losing blood from a bullet in his side, Sullivan tells his story, confessing to the murder he has just committed and revealing the identity of the person who may have murdered him. The mystery Sullivan unravels takes him from the beaches of Malibu to the grand estates in San Marino to a dimly-lit jazz club in Santa Monica to a ritzy fertility clinic in Beverly Hills, ultimately exposing what is perhaps the first case of "embryo-napping."

== Bibliography ==
=== Plays ===
- A Fine Romance (A Romantic Comedy) (1984)
- When Pig Fly! (An Evening of One Act Plays) (1993)
- One Mad Day! (A Screwball Comedy) (2008)

=== Novels ===
- The Immaculate Deception, A Tom Sullivan Mystery (2011) ISBN 978-1-4681-5630-0
- I Know Why the Caged Pig Oinks ~ And Other Love Stories (2012) ISBN 978-1-4699-9737-7

=== Non-fiction ===
- The Road to Villa Page: A He Said/She Said Memoir of Buying Our Dream Home in France ISBN 978-1-6200-6257-9
