= 10th Daytime Emmy Awards =

- Date: June 8, 1983
- Location: Sheraton New York Times Square Hotel
- Presented by: National Academy of Television Arts and Sciences

Highlights
- Outstanding Drama Series: The Young and the Restless
- Outstanding Game Show: The $25,000 Pyramid

The 10th Daytime Emmy Awards were held on Wednesday, June 8, 1983, to commemorate excellence in daytime programming from the previous year (1982). Unlike previous years, the ceremony was not telecast, although NBC had the option to do so.

Winners in each category are in bold.

== Outstanding Daytime Drama Series ==
- All My Children
- Days of Our Lives
- General Hospital
- One Life to Live
- **The Young and the Restless**

== Outstanding Actor in a Daytime Drama Series ==
- Peter Bergman (Cliff Warner, All My Children)
- James Mitchell (Palmer Cortlandt, All My Children)
- Stuart Damon (Alan Quartermaine, General Hospital)
- Anthony Geary (Luke Spencer, General Hospital)
- **Robert S. Woods** (Bo Buchanan, One Life to Live)

== Outstanding Actress in a Daytime Drama Series ==
- Susan Lucci (Erica Kane, All My Children)
- **Dorothy Lyman** (Opal Cortlandt, All My Children)
- Leslie Charleson (Monica Quartermaine, General Hospital)
- Erika Slezak (Victoria Lord, One Life to Live)
- Robin Strasser (Dorian Lord, One Life to Live)

== Outstanding Supporting Actor in a Daytime Drama Series ==
- **Darnell Williams** (**Jesse Hubbard, All My Children**)
- Howard E. Rollins, Jr. (Ed Hardy, Another World)
- David Lewis (Edward Quartermaine, General Hospital)
- John Stamos (Blackie Parrish, General Hospital)
- Anthony D. Call (Herb Callison, One Life to Live)
- Al Freeman, Jr. (Ed Hall, One Life to Live)

== Outstanding Supporting Actress in a Daytime Drama Series ==
- Kim Delaney (Jenny Gardner, All My Children)
- Eileen Herlie (Myrtle Fargate, All My Children)
- Marcy Walker (Liza Colby, All My Children)
- Robin Mattson (Heather Webber, General Hospital)
- Brynn Thayer (Jenny Wolek, One Life to Live)
- **Louise Shaffer** (Rae Woodward, Ryan's Hope)

== Outstanding Daytime Drama Series Writing ==
- All My Children
- General Hospital
- One Life to Live
- **Ryan's Hope**

== Outstanding Daytime Drama Series Directing ==
- All My Children
- General Hospital
- **One Life to Live**

== Outstanding Game Show ==
- **The $25,000 Pyramid** - A Bob-Sande Stewart Production for CBS
- The Price Is Right - A Mark Goodson Production for CBS
- Family Feud - A Mark Goodson Production for ABC (Syn. by Viacom)

== Outstanding Game Show Host or Hostess ==
- **Betty White** (Just Men!)
- Dick Clark (The $25,000 Pyramid)
- Richard Dawson (Family Feud)

== Outstanding Children's Entertainment Series (Tie) ==
- **William Hanna, Joseph Barbera and Gerard Baldwin (The Smurfs)**
- **Robert Keeshan and Jim Hirschfeld (Captain Kangaroo)**
