= Minrose Gwin =

American writer, editor and educator (born 1945)

- Born: November 9, 1945 (age 80); Tupelo, Mississippi, U.S.
- Education: Mississippi University for Women; University of Tennessee (BA, MA, PhD)
- Occupations: Novelist; memoirist; scholar; educator; editor
- Website: minrosegwin.com

Minrose Gwin (born November 9, 1945) is an American novelist, memoirist, literary and cultural scholar, teacher, and editor, whose works focus primarily on the American South. Like the characters in her novel Promise, she was born in Tupelo, Mississippi.

== Education ==
Gwin received her B.A., M.A., and Ph.D. in English from the University of Tennessee in Knoxville. She also attended Mississippi University for Women.

== Writing career ==
Gwin began her writing career as a general assignment news reporter, working at the Press-Register in Mobile, Alabama; United Press International in the Atlanta and Nashville bureaus, where she covered the civil rights movement; and the Knoxville News-Sentinel, where she worked the night police beat.

Gwin turned to freelance writing while in graduate school, then began writing scholarly books and articles after receiving her Ph.D. She is the author of four books of literary and cultural criticism and many articles and lectures. Her work focuses on issues of race, gender, sexuality, and region. She was one of the first scholars to write about southern women's slave narratives, as well as William Faulkner’s treatment of gender and the spatial dynamics of women’s fiction. In 2013, she published Remembering Medgar Evers: Writing the Long Civil Rights Movement, which brought together journalistic accounts, poetry, fiction, and song about the slain Mississippi Civil Rights leader, with a cover endorsement from his widow, Myrlie Evers-Williams who called the book “a treasure”. Gwin has also edited or coedited books, anthologies, and journals in the field of Southern literature.

In 2004, Gwin published the memoir Wishing for Snow about the collision of poetry and psychosis in her mother's life. The memoir marked her turn to creative writing. Her debut novel, The Queen of Palmyra (2010), was a finalist for the John Gardner Fiction Book Award and a Barnes and Noble Discover Great New Writers selection. Her second novel, Promise (2018), was shortlisted for the Willie Morris Award in Southern Literature; her third, The Accidentals (2019), received the Mississippi Institute of Arts and Letters Award for Fiction. Her fourth novel, Beautiful Dreamers, was scheduled for publication in 2024 by Hub City Press. Lee Smith has called The Queen of Palmyra "the most powerful and also the most lyrical novel about race, racism and denial in the American South since To Kill a Mockingbird", and Kirkus Reviews has described "Gwin's prose [as] profound and Faulknerian in tone."

== Teaching career ==
Minrose Gwin has taught as a professor at universities across the United States, including Virginia Tech (1983–1990), the University of New Mexico (1990–2001), Binghamton University (2001–2002), Purdue University (2002–2005), and the University of North Carolina at Chapel Hill, where she was Kenan Eminent Professor of English and Comparative Literature (2005–2018). She has given readings and lectures at universities, conferences, and other venues across the country. She is now retired from teaching.
