= Story editor =

Role in motion picture and television production

Story editor is a job title in motion picture and television production, also sometimes called supervising producer. The responsibilities of the story editor vary depending on the production.

== Live action ==
The story editor has many responsibilities, including finding new script/breakdown writers, developing stories with writers, and ensuring that scripts are suitable for production. The story editor will work closely with the writer on each draft of their story and script, giving the writer feedback on the quality of their work, suggesting improvements that can be made while also ensuring that practical issues, like continuity and correct running time, are adhered to. When a script is past due, multiple people may write an act. Many primetime series have an executive story editor and a story editor.

Marc Abrams of the TV series The Bernie Mac Show said, "As you go from show to show you learn that each has its own temperature and its own etiquette. You recognize your role on that particular show. Certain show runners encourage the lower-level writers to pitch ideas, others don't. Some want ideas well thought out before they are presented, others like to hear the kernel of an idea that could be expanded."

== Animation ==
In American animation on productions under the jurisdiction of IATSE Local 839, the story editor is not a lower-level writer, but rather the head writer of the series who oversees the writers' room, working directly with the showrunner or even serving as a showrunner. Their role involves brainstorming ideas, determining the direction of the show, directing the writing staff in breaking episodes and season arcs, and doing rewrites for the finished scripts. They collaborate with the executive producers and department heads to achieve a shared vision for the series.

== Notable story editors ==
- Mara Brock Akil
- Josh Berman
- Kay Cannon
- T. Rafael Cimino
- D. C. Fontana
- Ashley Gable
- Donald Glover
- Thomas Ian Griffith
- Dee Johnson
- Mindy Kaling
- Angela Kang
- Chelsea Peretti
- William James Royce
- Paul Rust
- Robert Van Scoyk

== See also ==
- Script editor
- Television crew
