= Medgar and Myrlie Evers Home National Monument =

Historic house in Mississippi, United States

- U.S. National Register of Historic Places
- U.S. National Historic Landmark
- U.S. Historic district – Contributing property
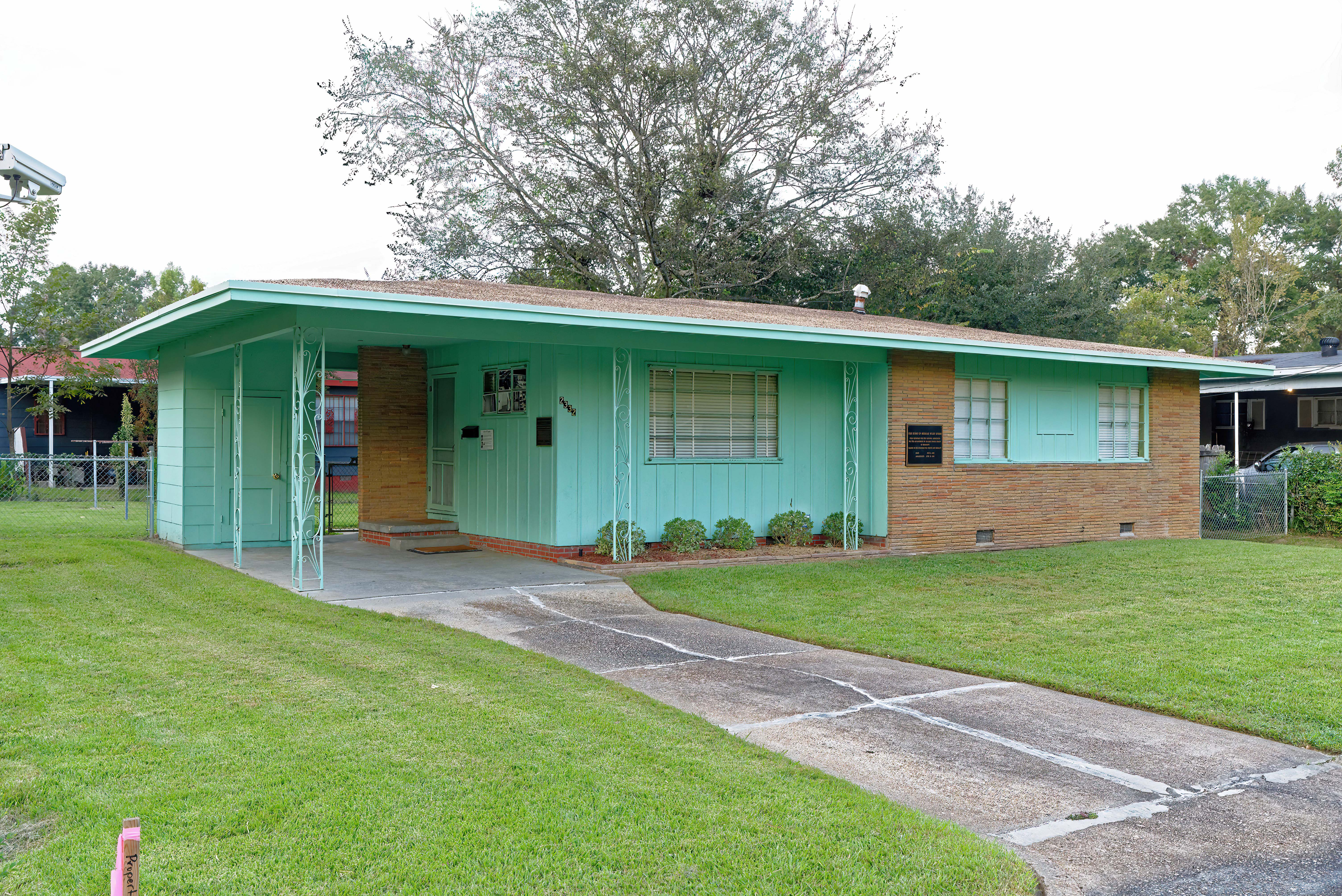
- The home in 2018
- Interactive map of Medgar and Myrlie Evers Home National Monument
- Location: 2332 Margaret Walker Alexander Drive, Jackson, Mississippi
- Coordinates: 32.34097°N 90.21265°W
- Area: 0.14 acres (0.057 ha)
- Built: 1956
- Built by: Leroy Burnett
- Architectural style: Ranch
- Visitation: 61,170 (2025)
- Part of: Medgar Evers Historic District (ID13000737)
- NRHP reference No.: 000001459, 100000791

Significant dates
- Added to NRHP: December 5, 2000
- Designated NHL: February 16, 2017
- Designated CP: September 18, 2013

The Medgar and Myrlie Evers Home National Monument, also known as Medgar Evers House, is a historic house museum at 2332 Margaret Walker Alexander Drive within the Medgar Evers Historic District in Jackson, Mississippi, United States. Built in 1956, it was the home of African American civil rights activist Medgar Evers (1925–1963) at the time of his assassination by a white supremacist. It was designated a National Historic Landmark in 2017. The John D. Dingell Jr. Conservation, Management, and Recreation Act, signed March 12, 2019, authorized it as a national monument; it was established on December 10, 2020, after the National Park Service (NPS) acquired it from Tougaloo College.

== Description and history ==
The house stands in northern Jackson, in what is called the Elraine Subdivision. This area was developed as the first planned middle-class subdivision for African-Americans in Mississippi after World War II. The house is on the north side of Margaret Walker Alexander Drive, a few doors east of its junction with Missouri Street. It is one of 36 similar single-story ranch-style houses built by Leroy Burnett and Walter J. Thompson. It is a single-story wood-frame structure, set on a foundation of brick piers. It has a broad shallow-pitch gabled roof, with a built-up covering of gravel. The roof has extended eaves with the rafters exposed. To the left side, the roof extends across a carport which is accessed via the original concrete driveway; the main entrance is under the carport shelter. Part of the facade is faced in brick veneer, while the rest is finished in asbestos siding. Interior features include a bullet hole in the wall separating the kitchen and living room.

The house was purchased new by Medgar and Myrlie Evers in 1956, and remained their home until 1963. The Everses were both active civil rights activists, and had for some time been specific targets of racist violence. They chose this house in part for features that improved its security: it was not on a corner lot, and its entrance under the carport provided better cover than a front door would. On May 28, 1963, a Molotov cocktail was thrown onto the carport. On June 11, 1963, Evers attended a meeting of civil rights groups in Jackson to formulate a response to actions taken by George Wallace, then Governor of Alabama, to prevent African-Americans from enrolling at the University of Alabama. Arriving home around midnight, Evers, standing in the carport, was shot by racist Klansman Byron De La Beckwith, using a sniper rifle, from an undeveloped lot about 200 feet (61 m) away. The bullet passed through the house's picture window, and through the wall between the living room and kitchen before coming to rest. Evers died early the next morning.

Myrlie Evers moved to California in 1964, continuing the civil rights crusade. She maintained ownership of the house for thirty years, using it as a rental property. She donated the property to Tougaloo College in 1993. The house underwent repairs and stabilization in 1995–96, and was restored to the appearance that it had during the Evers residency in 2013. Preservationist Catherine Fleming Bruce, whose book exploring the restoration of the national monument, opened with a quote from Rob Reiner, who included the site as a location during filming of the 1996 movie Ghosts of Mississippi.

In 2026, the Trump administration removed brochures at the monument that called Evers' murderer Byron De La Beckwith a racist. They also removed the description of Evers being found in a pool of blood. The moves are among censorship of history about slavery and racism at several National Park Service sites. Evers had previously been removed from Arlington National Cemetery's website as an African American veteran.

== See also ==
- List of National Historic Landmarks in Mississippi
- National Register of Historic Places listings in Hinds County, Mississippi
- Birmingham Civil Rights National Monument
- Freedom Riders National Monument
- Civil Rights Memorial, Montgomery, Alabama
- Civil rights movement in popular culture
- List of national monuments of the United States
