= Buddy Tucker =

Christian Identity minister and far-right figure

Dewey H. "Buddy" Tucker (d. c. November 2022) was an American minister from Dandridge, Tennessee, and former pastor of the "Temple Memorial Baptist Church" in Knoxville, Tennessee. He was a white nationalist, antisemitic, former Baptist and founder of the now-defunct group National Emancipation of our White Seed.

His activities associated him with Christian Identity leaders and white supremacists such as Dan Gayman, Gerald L. K. Smith, Byron De La Beckwith, Richard Butler and Bertrand Comparet, along with groups that include the National States' Rights Party, and Aryan Nations.

== Christian Identity activism ==
Tucker founded the Temple Memorial Baptist church on July 14, 1969, in Knoxville, Tennessee. The Congregation oriented itself towards certain Comparetian beliefs; particularly the "two-seedline" belief. This belief states that Jews are the product of Cain, due to a sexual encounter between Eve and Satan, while whites are the product of Adam and Eve.

In 1973, Tucker collaborated with Christian Identity leader Dan Gayman. The Anti-Defamation League reports that Gayman became affiliated with Tucker's National Emancipation of our White Seed (N.E.W.S) and also assisted in the publication of its anti semitic publication, The Battle Axe News. The two later conducted a tour of the west coast, at which time Tucker became associated with Bertrand Comparet and Richard Butler. Butler aligned his own church with N.E.W.S. in 1976 before forming Aryan Nations.

In April 1975, Tucker became acquainted with Christian nationalist Gerald L. K. Smith. Though this lasted less than a year as the result of Smith's death, Tucker was chosen to deliver the eulogy at Smith's funeral based on their shared extremist views.

On April 12, 1976, Tucker officially Incorporated N.E.W.S in Tennessee. On June 3 of the same year, in Schell City, Missouri, Tucker and Gayman, along with 34 other individuals, forced their way into the church pastored by Gayman's brother, Duane Gayman and unfurled banners reading "National Emancipation of our White Seed". This altercation was the result of Duane Gayman's split from Dan Gayman's increasingly extremist congregation. A clash with police occurred and Tucker and Gayman, along with 10 others were arrested for trespassing. Tucker failed to appear in court and a warrant was issued for his arrest on July 9, 1976.

In 1977, Tucker ordained white supremacist Byron De La Beckwith as a minister in the Temple Memorial Baptist Church, just before Beckwith began serving a prison sentence in Louisiana on charges related to a bombing and the attempted murder of A. I. Botnik, director of the New Orleans–based B'nai B'rith Anti-Defamation League.

== Prison sentence ==
Tucker was imprisoned in 1977 due to a 1974 conviction for willful failure to file. After losing his appeal, he surrendered to U.S. Marshals and served nine months in federal prison.

== Internet activities ==
Tucker ran two websites and a YouTube channel. One was an outreach website that posted antisemitic, white supremacist, anti-communist, and homophobic articles which dated back to the N.E.W.S. publication, The Battle Axe News, alongside Bible studies and then-current articles. The other website had content focused on Gerald L. K. Smith and contained writings of, and correspondence with, Smith as well as articles by Wesley Swift and other Christian Identity leaders.

== Death ==
On November 23, 2022, Tucker's son Paul used his father's Facebook account to report that he had died.
