= Adolph Botnick =

American civil rights activist (1924–1995)

- Born: August 17, 1924; New Orleans, Louisiana, U.S.
- Died: October 5, 1995 (aged 71)
- Occupations: Regional director (LA, MS, AR) of the Anti-Defamation League
- Known for: Civil rights activist

Adolph Ira "A. I." "B" Botnick (August 17, 1924 – October 5, 1995) was a Jewish American activist in the civil rights movement. He sought to minimize violence in race relations, "often maneuvering quietly behind the scenes to try to defuse potential violence and thwart the Ku Klux Klan". He was a target of an assassination plot by Byron De La Beckwith, who had previously assassinated civil rights leader Medgar Evers. The assassination was prevented when De La Beckwith was arrested for transporting a bomb across state lines.

Botnick was born and raised in New Orleans, Louisiana. He attended Gulf Coast Military Academy and served in the army in World War II; his unit fought in the Battle of the Bulge. Afterward, he graduated from Louisiana State University.

Botnick was recruited by the Anti-Defamation League (ADL) in 1961 and took a position in their Atlanta, Georgia office. In 1964 he became the ADL's regional director in New Orleans for the region of Louisiana, Mississippi and Arkansas. He held this position until his retirement in 1992.

He died at the age of 71.

In recognition of his work for the Anti-Defamation League, he is the namesake for its annual A. I. Botnick Torch of Liberty Award Dinner.
