= Byron De La Beckwith =

American white supremacist (1920–2001)

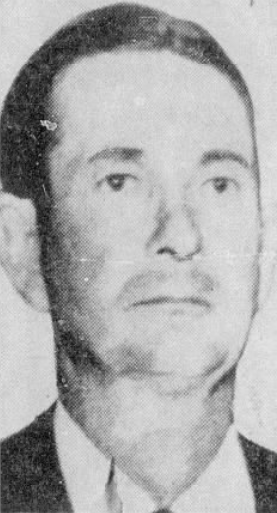
- De La Beckwith in 1964
- Born: November 9, 1920; Sacramento, California, U.S.
- Died: January 21, 2001 (aged 80); Jackson, Mississippi, U.S.
- Occupation: Salesman
- Spouse(s): Mary Louise Williams (multiple marriages and divorces); Thelma Lindsay Neff (1983)
- Children: 1
- Motive: White supremacy
- Conviction: Murder
- Penalty: Life imprisonment

Details
- Victims: Medgar Evers, 37
- Date: June 12, 1963
- Location: Jackson, Mississippi

Byron De La Beckwith Jr. (November 9, 1920 – January 21, 2001) was an American white supremacist and member of the Ku Klux Klan who murdered civil rights leader Medgar Evers on June 12, 1963, in Jackson, Mississippi.

In 1964, he was tried twice on a murder charge in Mississippi. The all-white male juries each ended in hung juries, and De La Beckwith went free. In 1994, based on new evidence, he was tried again. He was convicted of murder and sentenced to life in prison, where he died in 2001 at the age of 80.

== Early life and career ==
De La Beckwith was born in Colusa, California, the only child of Byron De La Beckwith Sr., a postmaster for the town of Colusa, and Susan Southworth Yerger. His father died of pneumonia when Byron Jr. was five years old. One year later, he and his mother settled in Greenwood, Mississippi, to be near her family. His mother died of lung cancer when De La Beckwith was 12 years old, leaving him orphaned. He was raised by his maternal uncle William Greene Yerger and his wife. They supported De La Beckwith in his educational studies, including one year at The Webb School.

== Military service ==
In January 1942, soon after the United States entered World War II, De La Beckwith enlisted in the U.S. Marine Corps. He served as a machine gunner in the Pacific theater. He fought in the Battle of Guadalcanal and was shot in the waist during the Battle of Tarawa. He was honorably discharged in August 1945.

After his return to the United States, De La Beckwith moved to Providence, Rhode Island, where he married Mary Louise Williams. The couple relocated to Mississippi, where they settled in his hometown of Greenwood. They had a son together, Delay De La Beckwith. De La Beckwith and Williams divorced. He later married Thelma Lindsay Neff in 1983.

== Career ==
De La Beckwith worked as a salesman for most of his life, selling tobacco, fertilizer, wood stoves, and other goods. In 1954, following the United States Supreme Court ruling in Brown v. Board of Education that segregated public schools were unconstitutional, he joined his local White Citizens' Council, which opposed desegregation of schools and businesses. He also became a member of the Ku Klux Klan, a white supremacist organization.

== Murder of Medgar Evers ==
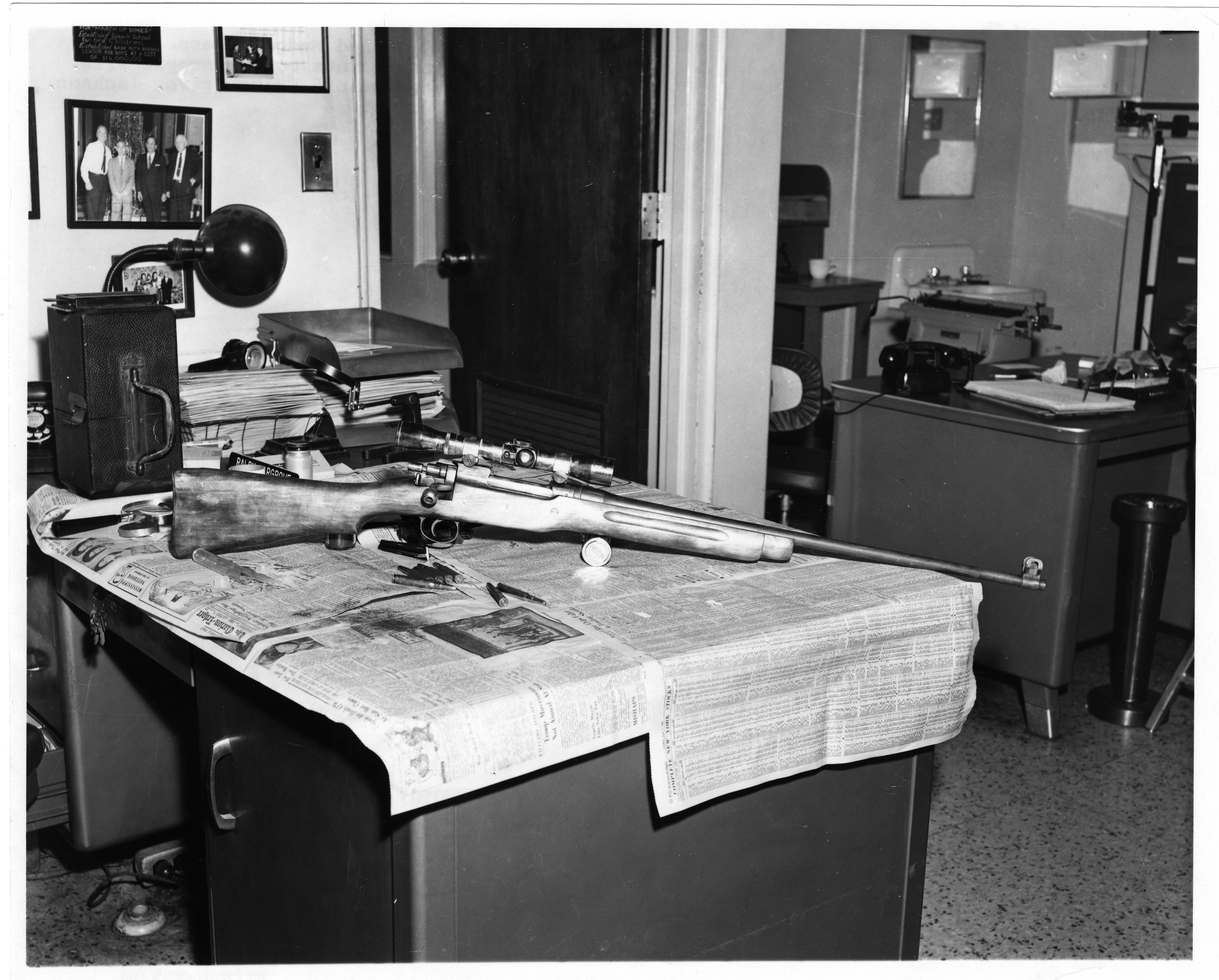
The rifle De La Beckwith used to kill Evers

On June 12, 1963, at age 42, De La Beckwith murdered Medgar Evers, civil rights leader and the NAACP's first state field secretary shortly after the activist arrived home in Jackson, Mississippi.

De La Beckwith had positioned himself across the street from Evers's home. Using a rifle, he shot Evers in the back. Evers died an hour later, aged 37. Myrlie Evers, his wife, and his three children, James, Reena, and Darrell Evers, were home at the time of the assassination.

Darrell, who was nine years old at the time, recalled the night: "We were ready to greet him, because every time he came home it was special for us. He was traveling a lot at that time. All of a sudden, we heard a shot. We knew what it was."

== Trials ==
The state prosecuted De La Beckwith twice for murder in 1964, but both trials ended with hung juries. Mississippi had effectively disenfranchised black voters since 1890. In practice, this also meant they were excluded from serving on juries, whose members were drawn from voter rolls. During the second trial, Ross Barnett, Democratic governor of Mississippi at the time of the assassination, shook hands with De La Beckwith in the courtroom. The White Citizens' Council paid De La Beckwith's legal expenses in both his 1964 trials.

In January 1966, De La Beckwith, along with a number of other members of the White Knights of the Ku Klux Klan, were subpoenaed by the House Un-American Activities Committee to testify about Klan activities. Although De La Beckwith gave his name when asked by the committee (other witnesses, such as Samuel Bowers, invoked the Fifth Amendment in response to that question), he answered no other substantive questions. In the following years, De La Beckwith became a leader in the segregationist Phineas Priesthood, an offshoot of the white supremacist Christian Identity movement. The group was known for its hostility toward African Americans, Jews, Catholics, and foreigners.

According to Delmar Dennis, who acted as a key witness for the prosecution at the 1994 trial, De La Beckwith boasted of his role in the death of Medgar Evers at several Ku Klux Klan rallies and similar gatherings in the years following his mistrials. In 1967, he unsuccessfully sought the Democratic Party's nomination for Lieutenant Governor of Mississippi.

In 1969, De La Beckwith's previous charges were dismissed. In 1973, informants alerted the Federal Bureau of Investigation that he planned to murder A.I. Botnick, director of the New Orleans-based B'nai B'rith Anti-Defamation League. The attack was a retaliation for comments that Botnick had made about white Southerners and race relations.

Following several days of surveillance, New Orleans Police Department officers stopped De La Beckwith as he was traveling by car on the Lake Pontchartrain Causeway Bridge to New Orleans. Among the contents of his vehicle were several loaded firearms, a map with highlighted directions to Botnick's house, and a dynamite time bomb. On August 1, 1975, De La Beckwith was convicted in Louisiana of conspiracy to commit murder and sentenced to five years in prison.

After losing his appeal, De La Beckwith was detained in Washington, D.C. for failing to report to prison. He served nearly three years of his five-year sentence at Angola Prison in Louisiana from May 1977 until he was paroled in January 1980. Just before entering prison to serve his sentence, De La Beckwith was ordained by Reverend Dewey "Buddy" Tucker as a minister in the Temple Memorial Baptist Church, a Christian Identity congregation in Knoxville, Tennessee. De La Beckwith was an avid follower of Wesley Swift.

In the 1980s, the Jackson Clarion-Ledger published reports on its investigation of De La Beckwith's trials in the 1960s. It found that the Mississippi State Sovereignty Commission, a state agency supported by taxpayers' money to purportedly protect the image of the state, had assisted De La Beckwith's attorneys in his second trial. The commission had worked against the civil rights movement in numerous ways; for this trial, it used state resources to investigate members of the jury pool during voir dire to aid the defense in picking a sympathetic jury. These findings of illegality contributed to the state conducting a new trial of De La Beckwith in 1994.

== 1994 trial for Evers's murder ==
Myrlie Evers, who later became the third woman to chair the NAACP, refused to abandon her husband's case. When new documents showed that jurors in the previous case were investigated illegally and screened by a state agency, she pressed authorities to reopen the case. In the 1980s, reporting by Jerry Mitchell of the Jackson Clarion-Ledger about the earlier De La Beckwith trials resulted in the state mounting a new investigation. It ultimately initiated a third prosecution, based on this and other new evidence.

By this time, De La Beckwith was living in Walden, Tennessee, just outside Signal Mountain, a suburb of Chattanooga. He was extradited to Mississippi for trial at the Hinds County Courthouse in Jackson. Before his trial, the 71-year-old white supremacist had asked the justices to dismiss the case against him on the grounds that it violated his rights to a speedy trial, due process, and protection from double jeopardy. The trial court denied the motion to dismiss and the Mississippi Supreme Court in December 1992 denied his interlocutory appeal on 4–3 vote. The case was scheduled to be tried in January 1994.

During this third trial, the murder weapon was presented, a "sporterized" Enfield .30-06 caliber rifle, with De La Beckwith's fingerprints. De La Beckwith claimed that the gun was stolen from his house. He listed his health problems, high blood pressure, lack of energy and kidney problems, saying, "I need a list to recite everything I suffer from, and I hate to complain because I'm not the complaining type".

On February 5, 1994, a jury composed of eight African Americans and four whites convicted De La Beckwith of murder for killing Medgar Evers. He was sentenced to life in prison. New evidence included testimony that during the three decades since the crime had occurred, De La Beckwith had boasted on multiple occasions of having committed the murder, including at a KKK rally. The physical evidence was essentially the same as that presented during the first two trials.

De La Beckwith appealed the guilty verdict, but the Mississippi Supreme Court upheld the conviction in December 1997. The court said that the 31-year lapse between the murder and De La Beckwith's conviction did not deny him a fair trial. De La Beckwith sought judicial review in the United States Supreme Court, but his petition for certiorari was denied in October 1998.

On January 21, 2001, De La Beckwith died after he was transferred from prison to the University of Mississippi Medical Center in Jackson, Mississippi. He was 80 years old. He had suffered from heart disease, high blood pressure, and other ailments for some time.

== Representation in other media ==
- "Where Is the Voice Coming From?" (1963), a short story by Eudora Welty, was published in The New Yorker on July 6, 1963. Welty, who was from Jackson, Mississippi, later said: "Whoever the murderer is, I know him: not his identity, but his coming about, in this time and place. That is, I ought to have learned by now, from here, what such a man, intent on such a deed, had going on in his mind. I wrote his story—my fiction—in the first person: about that character's point of view." It was published before De La Beckwith's arrest. So accurate was her portrayal that the magazine changed several details in the story before publication for legal reasons.
- Byron De La Beckwith is referenced in the 1963 Bob Dylan song "Only a Pawn in Their Game", which deplores Evers's murder.
- In 1991, author William James Royce wrote "Sweet, Sweet Blues", an episode of the NBC television series In the Heat of the Night. It was based on the murder of Evers and first trials of De La Beckwith. Actor James Best plays a character based on De La Beckwith, an aging Klansman who appears to have gotten away with murder.
- The feature film Ghosts of Mississippi (1996) tells the story of the murder and 1994 trial. James Woods's performance as De La Beckwith was nominated for an Academy Award.
- In 2001, Bobby DeLaughter published his memoir of the case and 1994 trial, Never Too Late: A Prosecutor's Story of Justice in the Medgar Evers Trial.

== See also ==
- Thomas Edwin Blanton Jr.
- Samuel Bowers
- Herman Frank Cash
- Robert Edward Chambliss
- Bobby Frank Cherry
