= Howard Rollins =

American actor (1950–1996)

Howard Rollins Jr.
- Rollins in Ragtime, 1981.
- Born: Howard Ellsworth Rollins Jr. October 17, 1950; Baltimore, Maryland, U.S.
- Died: December 8, 1996 (aged 46); New York City, New York, U.S.
- Resting place: Woodlawn Cemetery (Baltimore, Maryland)
- Education: Northern High School; Towson State University
- Occupation: Actor
- Years active: 1970–1996
- Known for: Virgil Tibbs – In the Heat of the Night

Howard Ellsworth Rollins Jr. (October 17, 1950 – December 8, 1996) was an American stage, film and television actor. He was best known for his role as Andrew Young in 1978's King, George Haley in the 1979 miniseries Roots: The Next Generations, Coalhouse Walker Jr. in the 1981 film Ragtime, as civil rights activist Medgar Evers in PBS' American Playhouse production of For Us the Living: The Medgar Evers Story in 1983, Captain Davenport in the 1984 film A Soldier's Story, and as Virgil Tibbs on the NBC/CBS television crime drama In the Heat of the Night (1988–1995).

Over the span of his acting career, Rollins was nominated for an Academy Award, a Golden Globe and an Emmy.

== Early life and education ==
Born to Ruth and Howard Ellsworth Rollins Sr. on October 17, 1950, in Baltimore, Maryland, Rollins was the youngest of four children. His mother was a domestic worker and his father a steelworker who died in 1975. Rollins attended Northern High School, graduating in 1968. After his high school graduation, Rollins studied theatre at Towson University.

== Career ==
In 1970, Rollins left college to play the role of Slick Robinson in the PBS soap opera Our Street. In 1974, Rollins moved to New York City, where he appeared in the Broadway productions of We Interrupt This Program... (1975), The Mighty Gents (1978) and G. R. Point (1979). He also appeared in the TV miniseries King and Roots: The Next Generations. In 1981, Rollins made his film debut in the Dino De Laurentiis/Miloš Forman motion picture Ragtime. His performance in the film earned him an Academy Award nomination for Best Supporting Actor as well as Golden Globe nominations for Best Supporting Actor in a Motion Picture and New Star of the Year in a Motion Picture. The following year, Rollins was nominated for a Daytime Emmy for his role on Another World. In 1983, Rollins portrayed civil rights activist Medgar Evers in the PBS American Playhouse production of For Us the Living: The Medgar Evers Story, which earned him a NAACP Image Award for Outstanding Actor in a Television Movie, Mini-Series or Dramatic Special. In 1984, Rollins starred in director Norman Jewison's film A Soldier's Story, which led to his role as Virgil Tibbs on In the Heat of the Night, the television series based on Jewison's acclaimed 1967 film of the same name.

In the Heat of the Night began airing on NBC in 1988. In 1989, Rollins's performance on the show earned him the NAACP Image Award for Outstanding Actor in a Drama Series. However, during the show's run, Rollins struggled with addiction to drugs and alcohol. He was arrested four times for drug and alcohol-related crimes, spending one month in jail for reckless driving and driving under the influence. Due to his ongoing personal and legal issues, Rollins was dismissed from the series at the end of season 6. Rollins returned for several guest appearances in the seventh season of the show in 1993 through 1994. While on the series, Rollins recorded "'Twas the Night Before Christmas" for the 1991 In the Heat of the Night Christmas CD, Christmas Time's A Comin', produced by his co-stars Randall Franks and Alan Autry. Franks wrote the musical score for the classic Christmas story that featured Rollins telling the story to children related to fellow cast members. After being fired from In the Heat of the Night, Rollins achieved sobriety and worked on rebuilding his career and reputation. In 1995, he appeared in a guest role on New York Undercover, followed by a role in the film Drunks. In 1996 (his last television acting role in his lifetime), he appeared in a guest role on Remember WENN. Rollins's final acting role was in the 1996 television movie Harambee!.

== Personal life ==
=== Legal issues ===
In 1988, Rollins pled guilty to cocaine possession in Louisiana. In 1992 and 1993, Rollins was arrested on three occasions for driving under the influence. In 1994, he served a month in jail for reckless driving and driving under the influence. Because of his legal problems, Rollins was dropped from In the Heat of the Night. After attending drug rehab, he returned to In the Heat of the Night as a guest star.

=== Death and legacy ===
In the fall of 1996, Rollins was diagnosed with AIDS. Six weeks later, on December 8, Rollins died at age 46 at St. Luke's-Roosevelt Hospital Center in New York City from lymphoma-related complications. His funeral was held on December 13 in Baltimore. Rollins was interred at Woodlawn Cemetery in his native Baltimore. On October 25, 2006, a wax statue of Rollins was unveiled at the Senator Theatre in Baltimore. The statue is now at Baltimore's National Great Blacks in Wax Museum.

== Filmography ==
Film
Year	Title	Role	Notes
1981	Ragtime	Coalhouse Walker Jr.	
1984	The House of God	Chuck Johnston	
1984	A Soldier's Story	Captain Richard Davenport	
1987	Dear America: Letters Home from Vietnam	Private David Bowman (voice)	
1990	On the Block	Clay Beasley	
1995	Drunks	Joseph	

Television
Year	Title	Role	Notes
1972– 1974	Our Street	Slick Robinson	56 episodes
1975	Ourstory	Quash	Episode: "Eliza"
1978	King	Andrew Young	2 episodes
1978	The Trial of the Moke	James Webster Smith	Television movie
1979	Roots: The Next Generations	George W. Haley	Episode: "Part VII (1960-1967)"
1979	My Old Man	Doctor	Television movie
1981	Thornwell	Carson	Television movie
1981	All My Children	FBI Agent	Episode: "1.2979"
1982	Fridays	Guest Host	Episode: "3.14"
1982	Another World	Ed Harding	139 episodes
1982	The Neighborhood	Allen Campbell	Television movie
1982	The Member of the Wedding	Honey Brown	Television movie
1983	For Us the Living: The Medgar Evers Story	Medgar Evers	Television movie
1983	Moving Right Along	Austin Berry	10 episodes
1984	A Doctor's Story	Dr. Zack Williams	Television movie
1984	The House of Dies Drear	Walter Small	Television movie
1984	He's Fired, She's Hired	Raoul	Television movie
1985	Wildside	Bannister Sparks	6 episodes
1986	The Boy King	Martin Luther King Sr.	Television movie
1986	The Children of Times Square	Otis Travis	Television movie
1986	Johnnie Mae Gibson: FBI	T.C. Russell	Television movie
1988– 1994	In the Heat of the Night	Chief of Detectives Virgil Tibbs	121 episodes
1992	With Murder in Mind	Samuel Carver	Television movie
1995	New York Undercover	Reverend Hundley	Episode: "The Smoking Section"
1996	Remember WENN	George Smith	Episode: "The Emperor Smith"
1996	Harambee!	Chimbuko	Television movie Final film role

== Awards and nominations ==
Year	Association	Category	Work	Result
1981	New York Film Critics Circle Awards	Best Supporting Actor	Ragtime	Runner-up
1982	Academy Awards	Best Supporting Actor	Ragtime	Nominated
1982	Golden Globe Awards	Best Supporting Actor	Ragtime	Nominated
1982	Golden Globe Awards	New Star of the Year – Actor	Ragtime	Nominated
1983	Daytime Emmy Awards	Outstanding Supporting Actor in a Drama Series	Another World	Nominated
1983	NAACP Image Awards	Outstanding Actor in a Television Movie, Mini-Series or Dramatic Special	For Us the Living: The Medgar Evers Story	Won
1989	NAACP Image Awards	Outstanding Actor in a Drama Series	In the Heat of the Night	Won
