= Medgar Evers =

American civil rights activist (1925–1963)

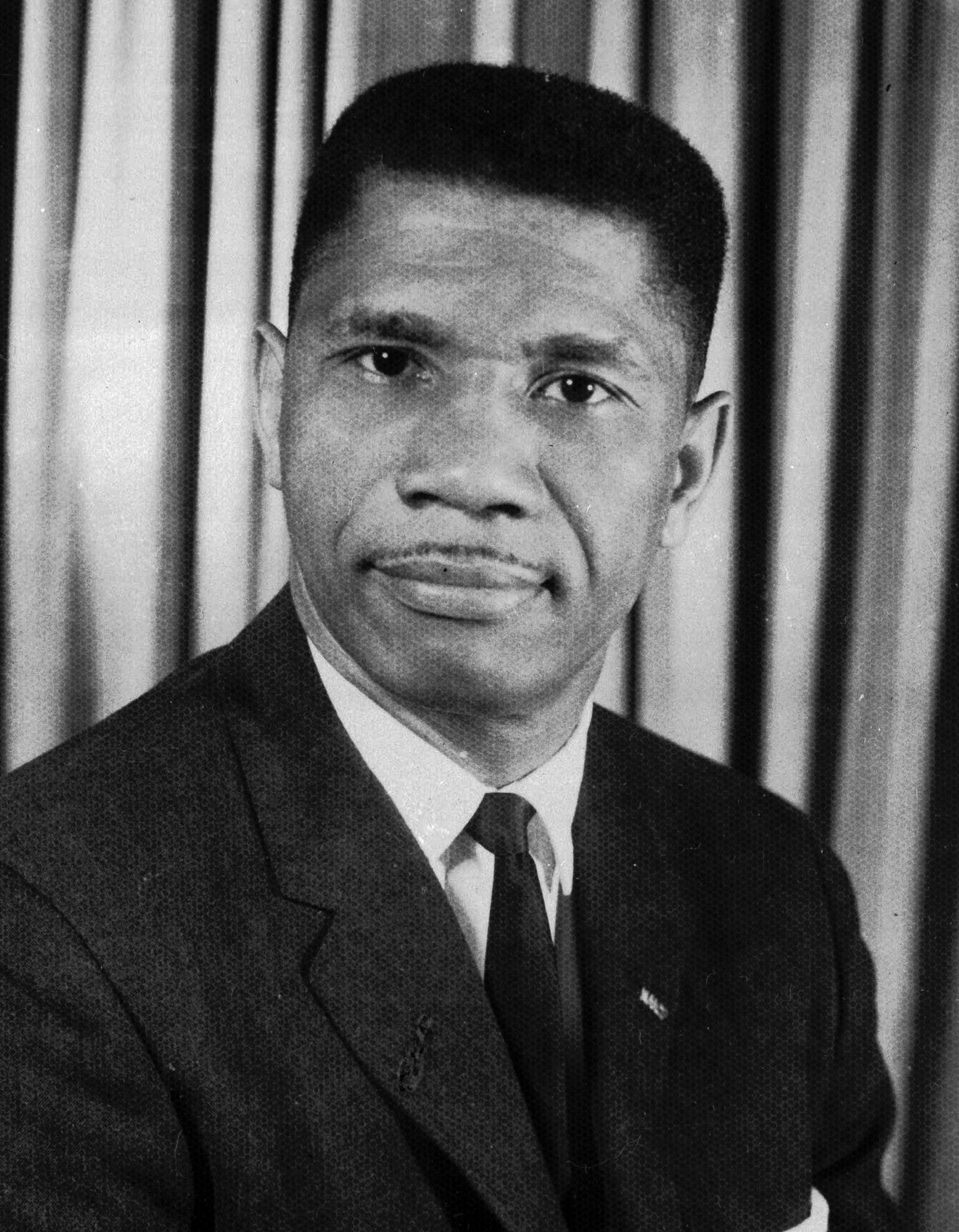
- Evers in c. 1963
- Born: Medgar Wiley Evers; July 2, 1925; Decatur, Mississippi, U.S.
- Died: June 12, 1963 (aged 37); Jackson, Mississippi, U.S.
- Cause of death: Assassination by gunshot
- Burial place: Arlington National Cemetery (with full military honors)
- Education: Alcorn State University (BA)
- Occupation: Civil rights activist
- Spouse: Myrlie Beasley (m. 1951)
- Children: 3
- Relatives: Charles Evers (brother)
- Military career
- Allegiance: United States
- Branch: United States Army
- Service years: 1943–1946
- Rank: Technician fifth grade
- Unit: 657th Port Company
- Conflicts: World War II; Western Front; Normandy landings

Medgar Wiley Evers (/ˈmɛdɡər/; July 2, 1925 – June 12, 1963) was an African American civil rights activist who was the NAACP's first field secretary in Mississippi. A United States Army veteran who served in World War II, he was engaged in efforts to overturn racial segregation at the University of Mississippi, end the segregation of public facilities, and expand opportunities for African Americans, including the enforcement of voting rights, prior to his assassination.

After college, Evers became active in the civil rights movement in the 1950s. Following the 1954 ruling of the United States Supreme Court in Brown v. Board of Education that segregated public schools were unconstitutional, he challenged the segregation of the state-supported public University of Mississippi. Evers applied to law school there, as the state had no public law school for African Americans. He also worked for voting rights, economic opportunity, access to public facilities, and other changes in the segregated society. In 1963, Evers was awarded the NAACP Spingarn Medal.

On June 12, 1963, Evers was murdered at his home in Jackson, Mississippi, now the Medgar and Myrlie Evers Home National Monument, by Byron De La Beckwith, a member of the White Citizens' Council in Jackson. Only hours earlier, Evers was listening to President John F. Kennedy's speech Report to the American People on Civil Rights.

Evers's assassination and the resulting trials inspired civil rights protests. His life and death have inspired numerous works of art, music, and film. Although all-white juries failed to reach verdicts in the first two trials of De La Beckwith in the 1960s, he was convicted in 1994 based on new evidence. Evers's widow Myrlie became a noted activist in her own right and served as national chair of the NAACP. In 1969, after passage of civil rights legislation and the Voting Rights Act of 1965, Medgar's older brother Charles was elected as mayor of Fayette, Mississippi. He was the first African American to be elected mayor of a Mississippi city in the post-Reconstruction era.

== Early life and education ==
Medgar Wiley Evers was born on July 2, 1925, in Decatur, Mississippi, the third of five children (including elder brother Charles Evers) of Jesse (Wright) and James Evers. The family included Jesse's two children from a previous marriage. The Evers family owned a small farm and James also worked at a sawmill. Evers and his siblings walked 12 miles (19 kilometers) a day to attend racially segregated schools; Medgar eventually earned his high school diploma.

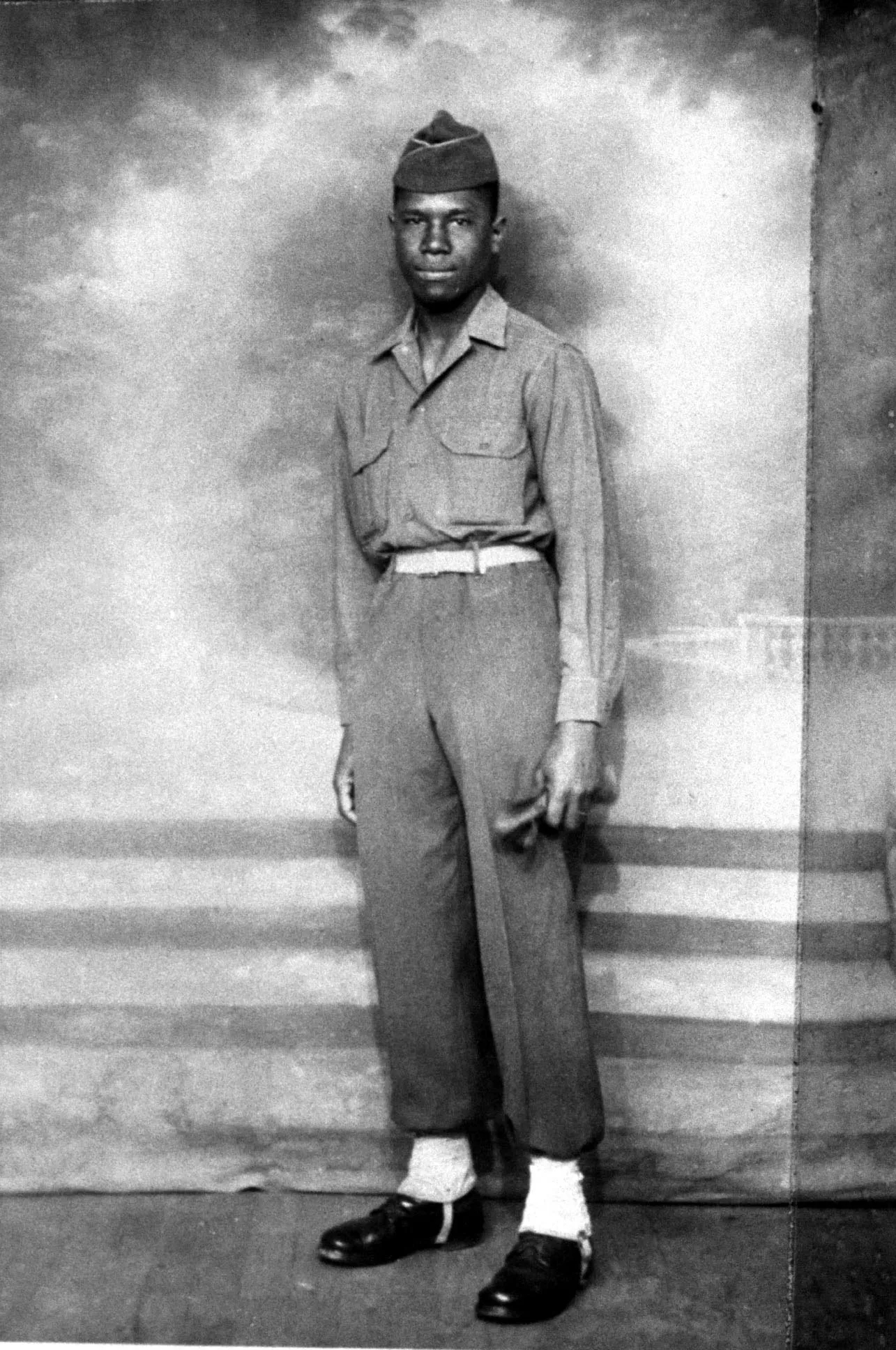
Evers while he was serving in the U.S. Army

In 1943, Evers enlisted in the United States Army at age 17. Evers served in the 657th Port Company, a segregated unit of the Army's Transportation Corps, participating in the Normandy landings in June 1944. In France, Evers's unit was part of the Red Ball Express, which delivered supplies to Allied troops fighting on the frontlines. During his time in the Army, Evers was angered by the segregation and mistreatment endured by African-American troops. While in France, Evers had many experiences that changed his perspective, including serving as a military policeman (a job unattainable by Black Mississippians) and dating a white French woman, which would have been a death sentence in Mississippi. Witnessing Black soldiers of the Free French Forces being treated as the equals of white troops, he once told Charles that "When we get out of the Army, we’re going to straighten this thing out!"

In 1946, Evers was honorably discharged from the Army at the rank of technician fifth grade. After returning to Decatur, Evers enrolled at the historically black Alcorn Agricultural and Mechanical College in 1948, majoring in business administration. He also competed on the debate, football, and track teams, sang in the choir, and was elected as junior class president. Evers earned his Bachelor of Arts in 1952. On December 24, 1951, Evers married classmate Myrlie Beasley. They had three children together: Darrell Kenyatta, Reena Denise, and James Van Dyke.

== Activism ==
Evers and his wife moved to Mound Bayou, Mississippi, a town developed by African Americans after the Civil War. Evers became a salesman for T. R. M. Howard's Magnolia Mutual Life Insurance Company.

Becoming active in the civil rights movement, Evers served as president of the Regional Council of Negro Leadership (RCNL), which began to organize actions to end segregation; he helped organize the RCNL's boycott of those gasoline stations that denied blacks the use of the stations' restrooms. Evers and his brother Charles attended the RCNL's annual conferences in Mound Bayou between 1952 and 1954, which drew crowds of 10,000 or more.

In 1954, following the U.S. Supreme Court ruling that segregated public schools were unconstitutional, Evers applied to the state-supported University of Mississippi Law School to challenge that practice in the state. His application was rejected due to his race, as the flagship school had long been segregated. Evers submitted his application as part of a test case by the NAACP.

On November 24, 1954, Evers was named as the NAACP's first field secretary for Mississippi. In this position, he helped organize boycotts and set up new local chapters of the NAACP. Evers was also involved with James Meredith's efforts to enroll in the University of Mississippi in the early 1960s.

Evers also encouraged Dr. Gilbert Mason Sr. in his organizing of the Biloxi wade-ins from 1959 to 1963, protests against segregation of the city's public beaches on the Mississippi Gulf Coast. Evers conducted actions to help integrate Jackson's privately owned buses and tried to integrate the public parks. Evers led voter registration drives and used boycotts to integrate Leake County schools and the Mississippi State Fair.

Evers's civil rights leadership, along with his investigative work, made him a target of white supremacists. Following the Brown v. Board of Education decision, local whites founded the White Citizens' Council in Mississippi, and numerous local chapters were started to resist the integration of schools and facilities. In the weeks before Evers was killed, he encountered new levels of hostility. Evers's public investigations into the 1955 lynching of Chicago teenager Emmett Till in Mississippi and his vocal support of Clyde Kennard had made Evers a prominent African-American leader. On May 28, 1963, a Molotov cocktail was thrown into the carport of his home. Ten days later, Evers was nearly run over by a car after he came out of the NAACP office in Jackson, Mississippi.

== Assassination ==
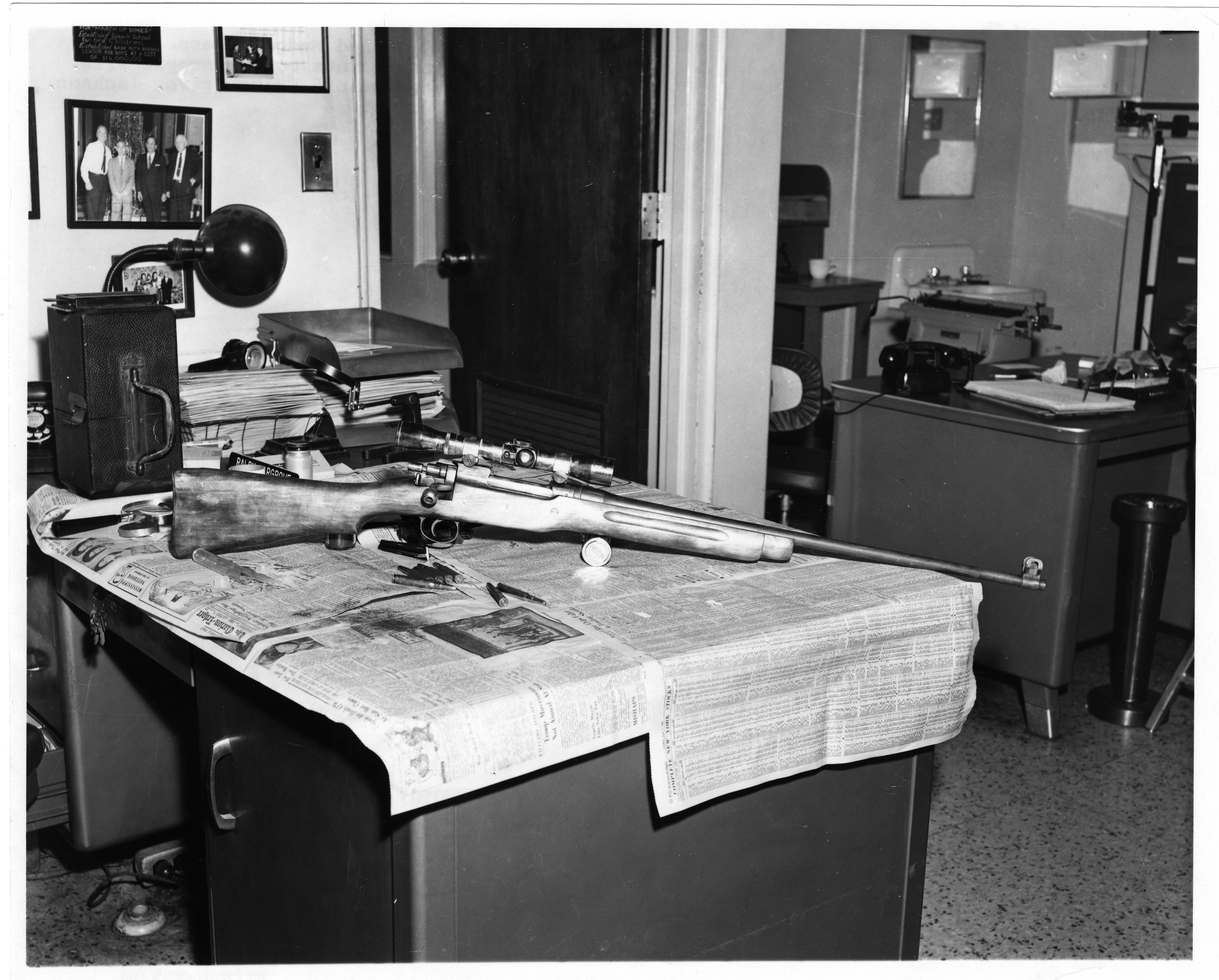
The rifle used by De La Beckwith to assassinate Evers

The Evers house at 2332 Margaret Walker Alexander Drive, now the Medgar and Myrlie Evers Home National Monument, where Medgar Evers was fatally shot after getting out of his car.

Evers lived with the constant threat of death. A large white supremacist population and the Ku Klux Klan were present in Jackson and its suburbs. The risk was so high that before his death, Evers and his wife Myrlie had trained their children on what to do in case of a shooting, bombing, or other kind of attack on their lives. Evers, who was regularly followed home by at least two FBI cars and a police car, arrived at his home on the morning of his death without an escort. None of his usual protection was present for reasons unspecified by the FBI or local police. There has been speculation that many members of the police force at the time were members of the Klan.

In the early morning of Wednesday, June 12, 1963, just hours after President John F. Kennedy's nationally televised Civil Rights Address, Evers pulled into his driveway after returning from a meeting with NAACP lawyers. His family had worried for his safety that day, and Evers himself had warned his wife that he felt in greater danger than usual.

Emerging from his car and carrying NAACP T-shirts that read "Jim Crow Must Go", Evers was struck in the back with a bullet fired from an Eddystone Enfield 1917 rifle; the bullet passed through his heart. Initially thrown to the ground by the impact of the shot, Evers rose and staggered 30 feet (10 meters) before collapsing outside his front door. His wife, Myrlie, was the first to find him. Evers was taken to a hospital in Jackson. He died at 1:20 am the following day. Mourned nationally, Evers was buried on June 19 in Arlington National Cemetery, where he received full military honors before a crowd of more than 3,000 people.

=== Aftermath ===
After Evers was assassinated, an estimated 5,000 people marched from the Masonic Temple on Lynch Street to the Collins Funeral Home on North Farish Street in Jackson. Allen Johnson, Martin Luther King Jr., and other civil rights leaders led the procession. The Mississippi police came to the non-violent protest armed with riot gear and rifles. While tensions were initially high in the stand-off between police and marchers, both in Jackson and in many similar marches around the state, leaders of the movement maintained non-violence among their followers.

=== Trials ===
On June 21, 1963, Byron De La Beckwith, a fertilizer salesman and member of the Citizens' Council (and later of the Ku Klux Klan), was arrested for Evers's murder. District Attorney and future governor Bill Waller prosecuted De La Beckwith. All-white juries in February and April 1964 deadlocked on De La Beckwith's guilt and failed to reach a verdict. At the time, most African-Americans were still disenfranchised by Mississippi's constitution and voter registration practices. That meant they were also excluded from juries, which were drawn from the pool of registered voters.

Myrlie Evers did not give up the fight for the conviction of her husband's killer. She waited until a new judge had been assigned in the county to take her case against De La Beckwith back into the courtroom. In 1994, De La Beckwith was prosecuted by the state based on new evidence. Bobby DeLaughter was the prosecutor. During the trial, the body of Evers was exhumed for an autopsy. His body was embalmed and was in such good condition that his son was allowed to view his father's remains for the first time in 30 years.

On February 5, 1994, De La Beckwith was convicted of murder and sentenced to life in prison, having lived as a free man for much of the three decades following the killing. He had been imprisoned from 1977 to 1980 for conspiring to murder A. I. Botnick. In 1997, De La Beckwith appealed his conviction in the Evers case, but the Mississippi Supreme Court upheld it, and the U.S. Supreme Court declined to hear it. He died at age 80 in prison on January 21, 2001.

== Legacy ==
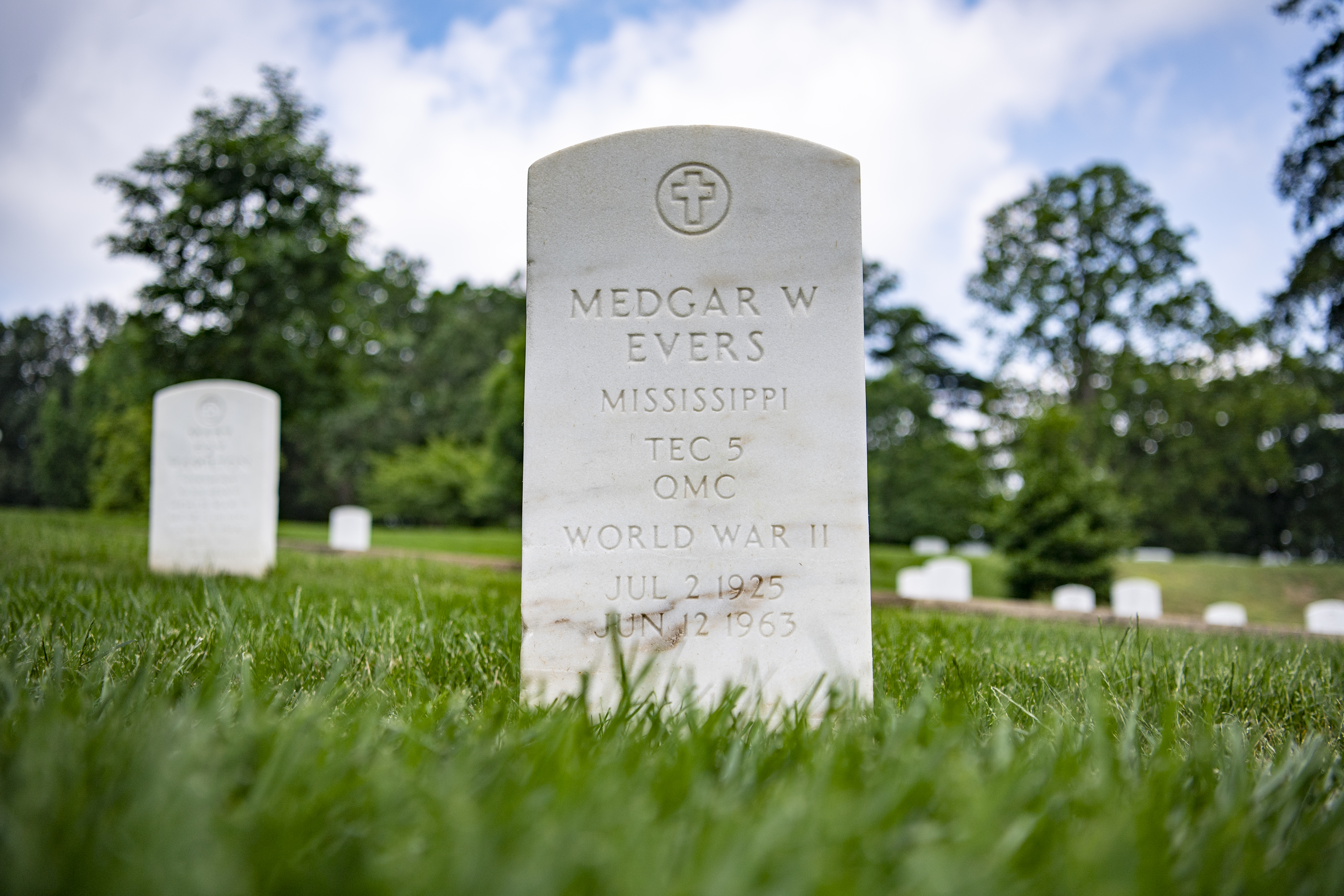
Evers's grave at Arlington National Cemetery

Evers was memorialized by leading Mississippi and national authors James Baldwin, Margaret Walker, Eudora Welty, and Anne Moody. In 1963, Evers was posthumously awarded the Spingarn Medal by the NAACP. Six years later, Medgar Evers College was established in Brooklyn, New York, as part of the City University of New York.

Evers's widow Myrlie co-wrote the 1967 book For Us, the Living with William Peters. In 1983, a television movie was made based on the book. Celebrating Evers's life and career, it starred Howard Rollins Jr. and Irene Cara as Medgar and Myrlie Evers, airing on PBS. The film won the Writers Guild of America award for Best Adapted Drama.

In 1969, a community pool in the Central District neighborhood of Seattle, Washington, was named after Evers, honoring his life.

On June 28, 1992, the city of Jackson, Mississippi erected a statue in honor of Evers. All of Delta Drive (part of U.S. Highway 49) in Jackson was renamed in his honor. In December 2004, the Jackson City Council changed the name of the city's airport to Jackson–Medgar Wiley Evers International Airport in Evers's honor.

Evers's widow Myrlie became a noted activist in her own right, eventually serving as national chairperson of the NAACP. Myrlie also founded the Medgar Evers Institute in 1998, with the initial goal of preserving and advancing the legacy of her husband's life's work. Anticipating the commemoration of the 50th anniversary of the assassination of Medgar Evers and recognizing the international leadership role of Myrlie Evers, the institute's board of directors changed the organization's name to the Medgar and Myrlie Evers Institute.

Evers's brother Charles returned to Jackson in July 1963 and served briefly with the NAACP in his brother's place. Charles remained involved in Mississippi civil rights activities for many years and in 1969 was the first African-American mayor elected in the state. He died on July 22, 2020, at age 97 in nearby Brandon.

On the 40th anniversary of Evers's assassination, hundreds of civil rights veterans, government officials, and students from across the country gathered around his gravesite at Arlington National Cemetery to celebrate his life and legacy. Barry Bradford and three students—Sharmistha Dev, Jajah Wu, and Debra Siegel, formerly of Adlai E. Stevenson High School in Lincolnshire, Illinois—planned and hosted the commemoration in his honor. Evers was the subject of the students' research project.

In October 2009, Navy Secretary Ray Mabus, a former Mississippi governor, announced that USNS Medgar Evers (T-AKE-13), a Lewis and Clark-class dry cargo ship, would be named in the activist's honor. The ship was christened by Myrlie Evers-Williams on November 12, 2011.

In June 2013, a statue of Evers was erected at his alma mater, Alcorn State University, to commemorate the 50th anniversary of Evers's death. Alumni and guests from around the world gathered to recognize his contributions to American society.

Evers was also honored in a tribute at Arlington National Cemetery on the 50th anniversary of his death. Former President Bill Clinton, Attorney General Eric Holder, Navy Secretary Ray Mabus, Senator Roger Wicker, and NAACP President Benjamin Jealous all spoke commemorating Evers. Evers's widow Myrlie Evers-Williams spoke of his contributions to the advancement of civil rights:

Medgar was a man who never wanted adoration, who never wanted to be in the limelight. He was a man who saw a job that needed to be done and he answered the call and the fight for freedom, dignity and justice not just for his people but all people.

Evers was identified as a Freedom hero by The My Hero Project.

In 2017, the Medgar and Myrlie Evers House was named as a National Historic Landmark. Two years later, the site was designated a National Monument.

The Route 3 Bridge over the Hackensack River is dedicated to Evers.

In 2024, Evers was awarded the Presidential Medal of Freedom by President Joe Biden. The following year, as part of a series of Trump administration anti-DEI deletions by the U.S. Department of Defense, a profile of Evers was deleted from the Arlington National Cemetery website.

Medgar Evers served as an important centerpiece in Scott Colom's successful 2026 Senate campaign in Mississippi, where Colom became the first Black person elected statewide since Reconstruction. This included filming a campaign ad at Evers' home as well as dedicating a portion of his victory speech to the Civil Rights activist.

== In popular culture ==
=== Music ===
Musician Bob Dylan wrote his song "Only a Pawn in Their Game" about the assassination on July 2, 1963, on what would have been Evers's 38th birthday. Nina Simone wrote and sang "Mississippi Goddam" about the Evers case. M Malvina Reynolds referenced Evers's murder in her song "It Isn't Nice". Immortal Technique referenced Evers in his song "Crossing the Boundary". Matthew Jones and the Student Nonviolent Coordinating Committee Freedom Singers recorded a version of the latter song. Wadada Leo Smith's album Ten Freedom Summers contains a track called "Medgar Evers: A Love-Voice of a Thousand Years' Journey for Liberty and Justice". Jackson C. Frank's self-titled debut album, released in 1965, also includes a reference to Medgar Evers in the song "Don't Look Back".

=== Essays and books ===
Eudora Welty's short story "Where Is the Voice Coming From?", in which the speaker is the imagined assassin of Medgar Evers, was published in The New Yorker in July 1963.

Attorney Bobby DeLaughter wrote a first-person narrative article entitled "Mississippi Justice" published in Reader's Digest about his experiences as state prosecutor in the murder trial. He added to this account in a book, Never Too Late: A Prosecutor's Story of Justice in the Medgar Evers Case (2001).

In Remembering Medgar Evers: Writing the Long Civil Rights Movement, Minrose Gwin, then the Kenan Eminent Professor of English at the University of North Carolina at Chapel Hill and coeditor of The Literature of the American South and the Southern Literary Journal, looked at the body of artistic work inspired by Evers's life and death—fiction, poetry, memoir, drama, and songs from James Baldwin, Margaret Walker, Eudora Welty, Lucille Clifton, Bob Dylan, and Willie Morris, among others.

=== Film ===
Evers was portrayed by Howard Rollins in the 1983 television film For Us the Living: The Medgar Evers Story.

The 1996 film Ghosts of Mississippi, directed by Rob Reiner, explores the 1994 trial of De La Beckwith in which prosecutor DeLaughter of the Hinds County District Attorney's office secured a conviction in state court. Beckwith and DeLaughter were played by James Woods and Alec Baldwin respectively, with Whoopi Goldberg as Myrlie Evers. Medgar was portrayed by James Pickens Jr. The film was based on a book of the same name. Preservationist Catherine Fleming Bruce, whose book explored the restoration of the Medgar and Myrlie Evers Home National Monument, opened with a quote from Reiner, who included the site as a location during filming of Ghosts of Mississippi.

In Mad Men's fifth episode from its third season, A.V. Club's Keith Phipps wrote about how Medgar Evers assassination played a prominent role in his A- episodic review.

In the documentary film I Am Not Your Negro (2016), Evers is one of three Black activists (the other two are Martin Luther King Jr. and Malcolm X) who are the focus of reminiscences by author James Baldwin, who recounts the circumstances of and his reaction to Evers's assassination.

In the 2011 film The Help, a clip of Evers speaking for civil rights appears on television, quickly followed by news of his assassination and a glimpse of an article by his widow published in Life magazine.

The 2020 documentary film The Evers features interviews with his surviving family members.

The 2022 film Till depicts Evers (played by Tosin Cole) assisting Mamie Till-Bradley (Danielle Deadwyler) seek justice for the murder of her son, Emmett Till (Jalyn Hall).

In 2025, Mississippi Public Television produced a two-hour documentary, About Everlasting: Life and Legacy of Medgar Evers.

== See also ==
- List of civil rights leaders
