= Myrlie Evers-Williams =

American civil rights activist (born 1933)

- Evers-Williams in 2000

Chair of the National Association for the Advancement of Colored People
- In office 1995–1998
- Preceded by: William Gibson
- Succeeded by: Julian Bond

Personal details
- Born: Myrlie Louise Beasley; March 17, 1933 (age 93) Vicksburg, Mississippi, U.S.
- Spouse(s): Medgar Evers (m. 1951; died 1963) Walter Williams (m. 1976; died 1995)
- Children: 3
- Education: Alcorn State University; Pomona College (BA)

Myrlie Louise Evers-Williams (née Beasley; born March 17, 1933) is an American civil rights activist and journalist who worked for over three decades to seek justice for the 1963 murder of her husband Medgar Evers, another civil rights activist. She also served as chairwoman of the NAACP, and has published several books on topics related to civil rights and her husband's legacy. On January 21, 2013, she delivered the invocation at the second inauguration of Barack Obama.

== Early life ==
External videos
- “Eyes on the Prize; Interview with myrlie evers" conducted in 1985 for the Eyes on the Prize documentary in which Evers discusses her childhood in Vicksburg and Tugaloo, MS, and her own experience of segregation.

Evers-Williams was born Myrlie Louise Beasley on March 17, 1933, in her maternal grandmother's home in Vicksburg, Mississippi. She was the daughter of James Van Dyke Beasley, a delivery man, and Mildred Washington Beasley, who was 16 years old. Myrlie's parents separated when she was just a year old; her mother left Vicksburg but decided that Myrlie was too young to travel with her. Since her maternal grandmother worked all day in service, with no time to raise a child, Myrlie was raised by her paternal grandmother, Annie McCain Beasley, and an aunt, Myrlie Beasley Polk. Both women were respected school teachers and they inspired her to follow in their footsteps. Myrlie attended the Magnolia school, took piano lessons, and performed songs, piano pieces or recited poetry at school, in church, and at local clubs.

Myrlie graduated from Magnolia High School (Bowman High School) in 1950. During her years in high school, Myrlie was also a member of the Chansonettes, a girls’ vocal group from Mount Heroden Baptist Church in Vicksburg. In 1950, Myrlie enrolled at Alcorn A&M College, one of the few colleges in the state that accepted African-American students, as an education major intending to minor in music. Myrlie is also a member of Delta Sigma Theta sorority. On her first day of school Myrlie met and fell in love with Medgar Evers, a World War II veteran eight years her senior. The meeting changed her college plans, and the couple later married on Christmas Eve of 1951. They later moved to Mound Bayou, where they had their first child, Darrell Kenyatta, named for the imprisoned African leader, Jomo Kenyatta. In Mound Bayou, Myrlie worked as a secretary at the Magnolia Mutual Life Insurance Company. Domestic life was strained by her husband's formal application to law school as his parents were opposed, Myrlie was expecting her second child, the family was financially restricted and unprepared for the increasing public exposure on his stealthy voting rights activities in the Delta. Reena Denise was born on September 13, 1954, as Medgar was establishing the NAACP in the Delta.

== Life with Medgar ==
When Medgar Evers became the Mississippi field secretary for the National Association for the Advancement of Colored People (NAACP) in 1954, Myrlie worked alongside him. Myrlie became his secretary and together they organized voter registration drives and civil rights demonstrations. She assisted him as he struggled to end the practice of racial segregation in schools and other public facilities, and as he campaigned for the voting rights many African Americans were denied in the South. For more than a decade, the Everses fought for voting rights, equal access to public accommodations, the desegregation of the University of Mississippi, and for equal rights in general for Mississippi's African-American population. As prominent civil rights leaders in Mississippi, the Everses became high-profile targets for pro-segregationist violence and terrorism. In 1962, their home in Jackson, Mississippi, was firebombed in reaction to an organized boycott of downtown Jackson's white merchants. The family had been threatened, and Evers targeted by the Ku Klux Klan. Evers was murdered in 1963 at his home in Jackson, Mississippi, now the Medgar and Myrlie Evers Home National Monument, by Byron De La Beckwith, a member of the White Citizens' Council in Jackson.

== Later career ==
In 1964, a year before Byron De La Beckwith's release, she moved with her children to Claremont, California, and emerged as a civil rights activist in her own right. She earned her Bachelor of Arts in sociology from Pomona College. She spoke on behalf of the NAACP and in 1967 she co-wrote For Us, the Living, which chronicled her late husband's life and work. She also made two unsuccessful bids for U.S. Congress. From 1968 to 1970, Evers was the director of planning at the center for Educational Opportunity for the Claremont Colleges.

From 1973 to 1975, Evers was the vice-president for advertising and publicity at the New-York-based advertising firm Seligman and Lapz. In 1975, she moved to Los Angeles to become the national director for community affairs for the Atlantic Richfield Company (ARCO). At ARCO she was responsible for developing and managing all the corporate programs. This included overseeing funding for community projects, outreach programs, public and private partnership programs and staff development. She helped secure money for many organizations such as the National Woman's Educational Fund, and worked with a group that provided meals to the poor and homeless.

== NAACP honors ==
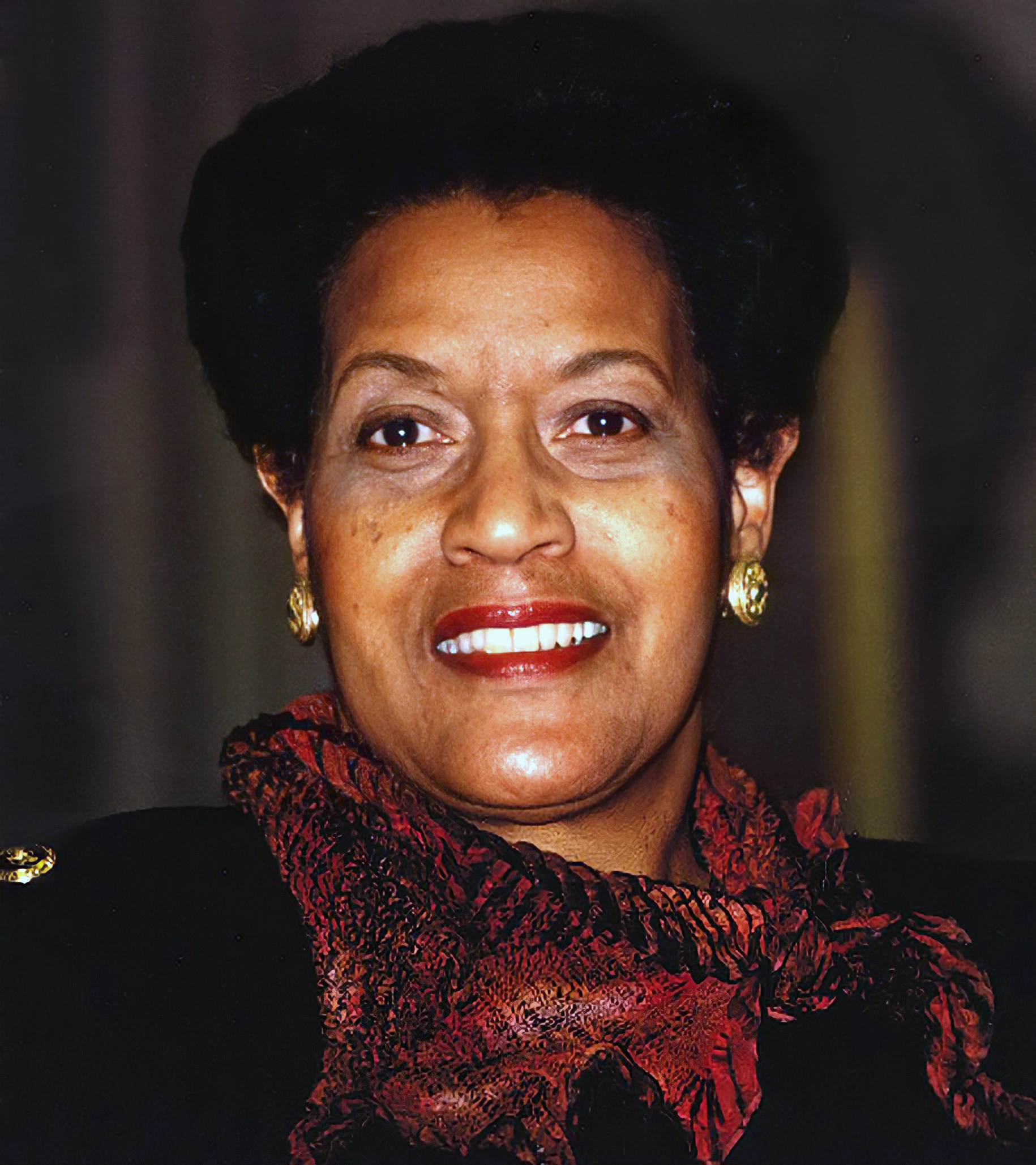
Evers-Williams in 2000

Myrlie Evers-Williams continued to explore ways to serve her community and to work with the NAACP. Los Angeles mayor Tom Bradley appointed her to the Board of Public Works as a commissioner in 1987. Evers-Williams was the first black woman to serve as a commissioner on the board, a position she held for 8 years. Evers-Williams also joined the board of the NAACP. By the mid-1990s, the prestigious organization was going through a difficult period marked by scandal and economic problems. Evers-Williams decided that the best way to help the organization was to run for chairperson of the board of directors. She won the position in 1995, just after her second husband's death due to prostate cancer. As chairperson of the NAACP, Evers-Williams worked to restore the tarnished image of the organization. She also helped improve its financial status, raising enough funds to eliminate its debt. Evers-Williams received many honors for her work, including being named Woman of the Year by Ms. Magazine. With the organization financially stable, she decided to not seek re-election as chairperson in 1998. In that same year, she was awarded the NAACP's Spingarn Medal.

== Other honors ==
In 2017 the Medgar and Myrlie Evers House was named as a National Historic Landmark, and in 2019 became a National Monument.

== Accomplishments ==
After leaving her post as chairwoman of the NAACP, Evers-Williams established the Medgar Evers Institute in Jackson, Mississippi, She also wrote her autobiography, titled Watch Me Fly: What I Learned on the Way to Becoming the Woman I Was Meant to Be (1999). She also served as editor on The Autobiography of Medgar Evers: A Hero's Life and Legacy Revealed Through His Writings, Letters, and Speeches (2005).

In 2009, Evers-Williams received the National Freedom Award from the National Civil Rights Museum in Memphis, Tennessee.

Ebony magazine named Evers-Williams as one of the "100 Most Fascinating Black Women of the 20th Century". She has received seven honorary doctorates.

In February 2012, Alcorn State University in Lorman, Mississippi, announced that Evers-Williams would be serving as a distinguished scholar-in-residence.

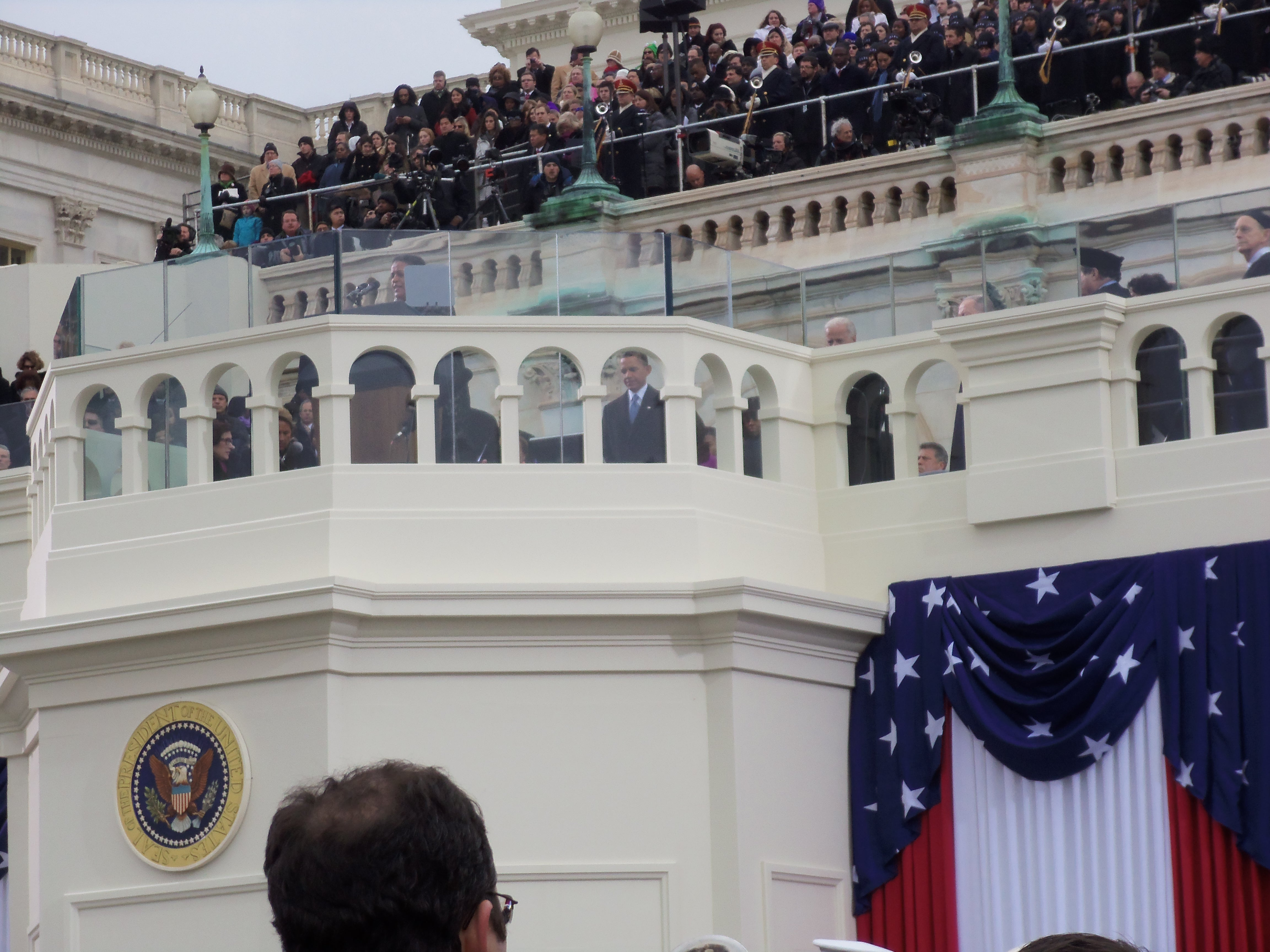
Evers-Williams delivering the invocation at the 2013 Presidential Inauguration

On January 21, 2013, Evers-Williams delivered the invocation at the second inauguration of Barack Obama. She was the first woman and the first layperson to deliver the invocation at a presidential inauguration.

== Personal life ==
On December 24, 1951, she married classmate Medgar Evers. Together they had three children: Darrell Kenyatta, Reena Denise, and James Van Dyke Evers. Evers was murdered in 1963 by Byron De La Beckwith, a member of the White Citizens' Council.

In 1976, Evers married Walter Williams, a stevedore and civil rights and union activist who had studied Evers and her work. They moved to Bend, Oregon, in 1993. Walter Williams died of cancer in 1995.

== Electoral history ==
Year	Office	Democrat	Votes	Pct	Republican	Votes	Pct
1970	U.S House of Representatives; California District 24 (special election)	Myrlie Evers	29,248	31.8%	John H. Rousselot	62,749	68.2%
1970	U.S House of Representatives; California District 24 (general election)	Myrlie Evers	61,777	32.4%	John H. Rousselot	124,071	65.1%

== Popular culture ==
- She was portrayed by Irene Cara in the 1983 television movie For Us the Living: The Medgar Evers Story.
- Whoopi Goldberg played Evers-Williams in the feature film historical drama Ghosts of Mississippi (1996).
- In 2013, she was portrayed by Gloria Reuben in the Lifetime movie Betty and Coretta (uncredited).
- Myrlie is the namesake of a song from American rapper Rapsody's 2019 album, "Eve (Rapsody album)".
- She was portrayed by Jayme Lawson in the 2022 film Till.
