= Red Crown Tourist Court =

Site of a gunfight in 1933

Coordinates: 39.3124°N 94.6826°W

The Red Crown Tavern and Red Crown Tourist Court in Platte County, Missouri, was the site of a July 20, 1933, gun battle between lawmen and outlaws Bonnie and Clyde and three members of their gang. The outlaws made their escape, and were tracked down and cornered four days later near Dexter, Iowa, and engaged by another posse. The shootout was depicted in Arthur Penn's 1967 film Bonnie and Clyde, though the sign on the motel in the movie reads "Platte City, Iowa", not Missouri.

Built in 1931 by Parkville, Missouri, banker and developer Emmett Breen at the junction of US 71 and Missouri State Route 35, now Cookingham Drive - Former Missouri Route 291, the red brick and tile tavern included a popular restaurant and ballroom. Back behind the tavern was the tourist court— two small cabins connected by two garages. The site is just northeast of the main Kansas City International Airport exit off I-29. Today it is within the city limits of Kansas City. An Interstate entrance ramp runs almost squarely through the property.

== The gang seeks refuge ==
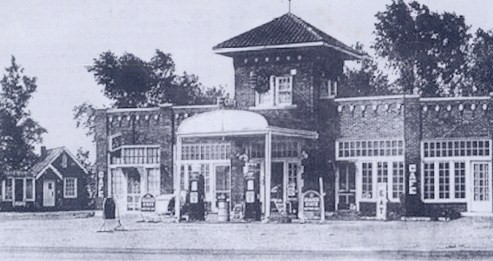
The Red Crown complex in the 1940s. The cabins peek out from the backyard at left. By the 1940s, the central garages had been replaced with extra guest rooms.

Clyde Barrow was uncharacteristically looking for a place for the gang to hole up in for several nights. It was his usual practice to keep moving and never spend more than one night in any given spot, but the previous weeks had been difficult. On June 10, a one-car wreck at Wellington, Texas, had left Bonnie Parker critically burned and near death. While the gang hid and tried to nurse Parker in a Ft. Smith, Arkansas, tourist court, Buck Barrow and W.D. Jones were sent to raise funds. They bungled the robbery and killed the town marshal of Alma, Arkansas. The resultant police attention forced the gang to move on despite Parker's dire condition, and by mid-July, Barrow hoped they could put their feet up for several days in the same place.

To bankroll their stay, on July 18 the outlaws staged a freewheeling—if rather minor-league—crime rampage through the quiet streets of Fort Dodge, Iowa, stopping at one gas station after another, ransacking the cash registers and robbing and kidnapping the attendants, shoving them onto the backseat. They broke open the vending and gumball machines and scooped out all the change, a move which had unexpected consequences for them several days later. After three such robberies in fifteen minutes they realized they had no more room for hostages, released everybody, and with another $150 headed for Kansas City. It was 250 mi (400 km) distant over 1933 roads, yet they were there in under four hours.

Buck agreed in principle with the idea of a long rest, but disagreed with the choice of Kansas City because the bloody Kansas City Massacre of some weeks earlier meant that numerous federal, state, and local police officers were seeking gangsters in the area. The brothers fought bitterly about the plan before lapsing into a toxic silence that enveloped the car. Late that night they pulled in to refuel at Slim's Castle, a service station, café, and convenience store at the busy Platte City intersection known locally as "The Junction", and the Red Crown Tourist Court across the street caught Clyde Barrow's eye. What attracted him initially was the sturdy brick construction of the place, which made him feel secure, he told his family later. He told his hot, dirty, agitated passengers, "This is where we stay the rest of the night, even if we all get killed before morning."

== At the Red Crown ==
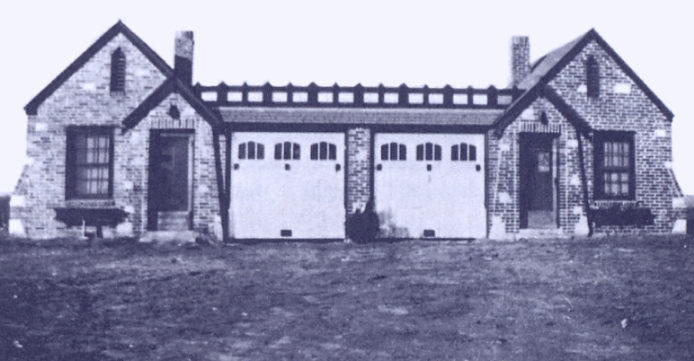
The cabins out back. One cabin had an internal door to the central garage, the other did not. Buck and Blanche Barrow would pay the price for this difference.

The Slim's Castle attendant directed Barrow to the Red Crown office in the tavern building. Before they drove over, they covered Buck and Jones with blankets in the backseat so that when Blanche Barrow went in to book the room, she could claim they were a party of three. This was not to save money off the room tab but was Clyde's attempt to disguise the size and makeup of the party if any prying officers inquired about them. What he didn't know was that the Red Crown was a favorite gathering spot of the Missouri Highway Patrol, in the days before two-way radio in patrol cars, when "officers and supervisors would often meet somewhere at mealtimes to exchange messages and receive orders".

The Red Crown manager, Neal Houser, was immediately suspicious when Blanche entered the office in tight, provocative jodhpurs (riding breeches), an outfit unheard of in Platte City and one much discussed at the time and still remembered by eyewitnesses forty years later. She booked both rooms out back for three guests, one night, then paid the $4 with a fistful of small change. Houser watched out his rear window as the driver of the car carefully backed it—nose out, "gangster style"—into the left garage and closed up the doors.

A short time later, the young woman reappeared at the tavern's restaurant and bought five chicken dinners and five beers for the party of three. She paid for them with more small change. Houser insisted on following Blanche back to the cabins to record the car's license plate number but had to content himself with just peering into the garage for it when Clyde wouldn't let him into the cabin. After he left, the five settled in for supper. Since the two brothers were still not speaking to each other, it was a silent, somber repast.

The gang slept late the following morning. Overnight, Clyde had taped newspapers up inside the windows of the left cabin, revealing another flaw in his selection of the Red Crown: with only two units, there were no other guests with whom to blend in. This was apparent to everyone but the outlaws: even The Platte County Landmark noted "Windows curtained with newspapers, continually peeping out of windows by the gang, refusing to admit any of the station [tavern] employees to the cabins, hiding from view all of the members except one woman, created a suspicion on the part of Neal Houser ..." Blanche appeared again, again in her jodhpurs, again buying five meals for her party of three, and once again paying in small change. This time, she felt the air of suspicion around her and when later she learned his identity, realized it had been the eyes of Platte County Sheriff Holt Coffey boring into her as she completed her transaction.

Clyde had instructed her to pay for another night's stay, but "to see how the people acted and what I thought about them, if I thought it would be safe to stay there another night". Blanche got a bad feeling from Houser as she handed more coins into his hands, but when she apprised Barrow of her fears, "Clyde said it was just my imagination, that everything would be all right. So I said no more."

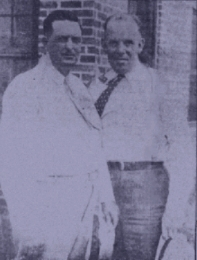
The sheriff and the captain, Coffey (left) and Baxter joined forces to take on the Browning Automatic Rifle (BAR)-boosted firepower of Bonnie and Clyde.

It was not just her imagination. Red Crown manager Houser had lawman restaurant patrons other than Sheriff Coffey—namely Captain William Baxter of the state patrol. Houser had a word with Baxter about his suspicions concerning his motel guests, and Baxter spoke with Coffey. When the hotelier mentioned the Oklahoma plates on their car, the officers began wondering who might be in the cabins with the taped-over windows, which limited visibility in both directions.

Later that afternoon, Sheriff Coffey got a call from Louis Bernstein, the druggist at Platte City Drugs, about a stranger who had just left his store: "a good-looking gal in a slinky riding habit", the eager pharmacist reported. Both drug stores and law enforcement agencies had been alerted by Oklahoma, Texas, and Arkansas officials to be on the lookout for strangers seeking certain medical supplies. The stranger was Blanche, buying bandages and atropine sulfate to treat Bonnie's leg burns.

For Coffey and Baxter, Bernstein's call pushed the situation to high alert: if the guests had bought burn wound supplies, it may well be the scorched Bonnie Parker and the Barrows within the brick cabins. Although "[m]ost of the general public had never heard of them", that afternoon, Coffey's son Clarence was on the scene as it dawned on his dad whom he would be going up against: "The look on my father's face," he told the papers then and later, "I'll never forget that!"

Coffey's was just a county sheriff's operation—"no protective gear, no radios, no weapons to speak of other than 'squirrel rifles and a few pistols'". Even with Baxter's help, both men knew they were seriously outgunned. Platte County prosecutor David Clevenger suggested they confer with Jackson County Sheriff Tom Bash in nearby Kansas City, a big-city jurisdiction "whose available armaments included machine guns, steel bulletproof shields, tear gas launchers, and armored cars". Coffey headed over to Bash's Kansas City office, but did not get the response he had hoped for. "I'm getting pretty damn tired of every hick sheriff in the country coming in here and telling me they have a bunch of desperadoes holed up and wanting help. I'm afraid there's nothing I can do for you," Bash said. Coffey was tenacious and eventually got Bash to agree to supply some men, some weaponry, bulletproof shields, and "a bulletproof car".

Word was getting around town that there might be a replay of the "Kansas City Depot job" out at The Junction. Participants and spectators began gravitating to the tavern and to Slim's Castle across the road as the sweltering July day led to a muggy July night. The assault force numbered twelve: five from Platte County (Sheriff Holt Coffey, Constable Byron Fisher, Constable Thomas Hullet, Deputy James Thorpe, and Deputy Clarence Coffey), four from Jackson County (Sheriff Thomas B. "Tom" Bash, Deputy George Highfill, Deputy George Borden, and Deputy Lincoln Baker), and three from the state patrol (Capt. William Baxter, Sgt. Thomas Whitecotton, Jr., and Trooper Leonard "L. A." Ellis).

Coffey and Baxter thought it best to wait until later to make their move, after the traffic of the intersection and its two busy establishments had thinned out. Everyone seemed to sense the impending action—except the outlaws, shrouded by their newspaper curtains.

After dark, Blanche emerged and covered the short distance to the tavern to get more soap and some fresh towels. As she entered,

I noticed everyone in the place was doing a lot of talking. I could hear them and see several of them sitting around a table. But when I walked in everyone stopped talking. The place was so quiet you could hear a pin drop. It was just as quiet as a death chamber. I knew something must be wrong. ... Everyone acted as though I might pull out a machine gun and turn it on them at any minute. As soon as I stepped outside, the talking started again. ... "

She told her husband about the ominous behavior of the crowd in the tavern, and he told her to go to the other cabin and tell Clyde. They apparently still were not speaking. Clyde, despite his often-cited "sixth sense" about impending danger, was unconcerned and told her not to worry about it. "'Okay,' I said. 'If we all get killed here tonight, you can't say I didn't warn you.'" She returned to her own cabin, followed shortly by Jones with a message from Clyde: he wanted her to fetch more food. This angered Blanche and she told Jones to tell Clyde that she wasn't going out any more that night, which angered Clyde.

The lawmen watching the cabins were surprised when, at about 10:30 pm, one of the doors opened and a young man emerged. Up to this point, it had been the slender woman in the riding breeches who had done all the errand-running. Seventeen-year-old W.D. Jones crossed the road, went into Slim's Castle and ordered five sandwiches and five bottles of soda pop. Clerk Kermit Crawford noticed the young man seemed nervous and kept peering over at the people milling about in the Red Crown parking lot. It could not have seemed too out-of-the-ordinary to the young outlaw—he did not mention it to his boss.

== The gun battle ==
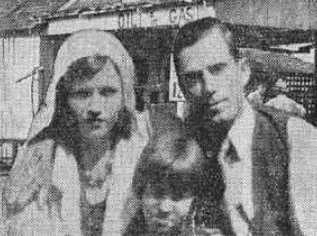
Blanche and Buck Barrow got the worst of the shootout. His head wound was later fatal. Flying glass blinded her in her left eye.

All the preparations, reinforcements, and armaments made the Red Crown firefight something no other Barrow Gang gunbattle to date had been: a fairer fight. At Stringtown, Joplin and Alma, officers had wandered into encounters with the Barrows totally unaware that they were about to go up against gunmen with vastly superior weaponry—and with no compunction about using it quickly and ferociously. "The poorly armed cops expected to confront small-timers whose firepower was equally limited," writes Jeff Guinn of the earlier confrontations, but tonight's encounter would be "a coordinated assault by well-prepared, well-armed officers aware of exactly who they were up against".

By 1 am, the revellers had mostly departed the Red Crown Tavern. Sheriff Coffey, Captain Baxter and eleven patrolmen, county cops and Jackson County officers began their operation. Accounts differ in details, but Coffey certainly advanced on the cabins. He may have been accompanied by Baxter and possibly others, carrying one or more massive shields made out of thick boilerplate, "like medieval knights".

The two Jackson County officers pulled the armored car up to block the cabins' garage doors—so the gang was completely hemmed in. Coffey rapped sharply on the door of Buck and Blanche's cabin. Blanche called out that she wasn't dressed, to which Coffey replied, "Well put your trousers on and come out yourself." He then asked where the men were, and she told him, as loudly as she could so Clyde would hear it, that they were in the other cabin.

Clyde heard it—and he and Jones unleashed a mighty torrent of fire, joined almost immediately by Buck, all three shooting their BARs right through the windows and doors of the cabins. Coffey's nineteen-year-old son Clarence was watching from behind and later said his father "was pushed back like he was hit by a high-pressure hose". The boilerplate shield stood up to actual penetration, but the BARs' impact was literally staggering to the sturdily-built sheriff. The flying glass and wood-chip debris abraded the officers, but they were able to fall back, miraculously without being hit by any outlaw gunfire.

They returned the fire, but even their substantial, .45-caliber Thompson guns were no match for the bandits' thundering Browning output: one BAR slug exiting the cabin penetrated the rear wall of the kitchen in the tavern, passed through both walls of a stove and wound up lodged in Coffey Jr's arm. Others penetrated tavern walls at both ends of the place, and several ricocheted off the pavement of the Slim's Castle parking lot. People for miles around heard the gunfire on the quiet night air.

Inside their cabin, Clyde and Jones dashed through the internal door to the garage and prepared to get the car loaded and started. When they peeked out the garage door, they saw the armored car blocking their exit. The vehicle outside was not a military or Brinks-truck style armored car, but a normal-appearing automobile with bulletproof glass and extra boilerplate embedded in its body for protection. The armored car was not all that bulletproof. The outlaws opened fire on it immediately and the armor-piercing rounds from their BARs found their way inside. Driver George Highfill was hit in both knees and either the horn button or the horn itself was hit and it began blaring in an unyielding wail.

The posse assumed this was a cease-fire signal and they did just that. Many fell back. One headlight had been shot askew into a straight-up beam, and Highfill decided his machine was just not up to this particular challenge, so he backed it away from the action, and the cabins' garages were no longer barricaded. To add to the confusion, an officer back behind the cabins fired off a tear gas rocket that overshot the cabins considerably, and came down across the road in the Slim's Castle parking lot—with the gas then blowing back over the officers on the Red Crown side.

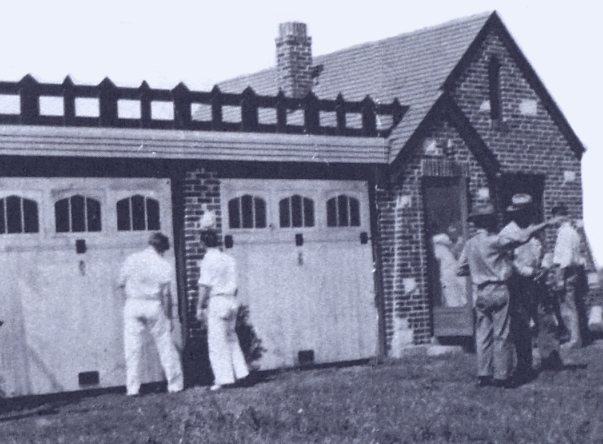
The day after the firefight: workers make repairs to the garage doors while officers rehash the details of last night's bullet-filled escape by the Barrow Gang.

Clyde Barrow recognized a stroke of luck when he saw one—the main impediment to his escape just backed away—and he bundled Jones and Parker into the car, easily accomplished through the internal door. Buck and Blanche were not so lucky. There was no door between their cabin and the garage—they had to come out into the open to get to the car.

When they made their dash, the officers opened up again with their large caliber Tommy guns, and a bullet fired by Baxter hit Buck in the left temple and exited out his forehead. He was firing his BAR at waist level when he was hit, and it continued to fire in an arc skyward as he was knocked off his feet. Eighty-one pound Blanche and her brother-in-law manhandled her limp husband into the car while Jones laid down cover fire.

His party all aboard, Clyde roared past Holt Coffey and the others, straight out of the Red Crown parking lot and onto Highway 71. The police posse fired one final, blistering volley at the car, many slugs finding their marks. One Thompson burst raked over the rear window and sent slivers of shattered glass into both eyes of Blanche Barrow, and a fragment of bullet into her head, right at the hairline.

The car disappeared into the night. One posseman, patrolman L. A. Ellis, tried to muster support for an expedition of pursuit, but got no takers.

As the smoke—and the tear gas—cleared, the lawmen took stock of their assault. Despite the large number of rounds expended by the outlaws, by far the most of any of their gunbattles, injuries to the officers were minimal. Sheriff Coffey had two scratches on his neck from buckshot, but he was so proud and "bragged about being shot by the Barrow Gang and living to tell about it, that officers Whitecotton and Ellis decided not to ruin the Platte County sheriff's story by revealing that he had been hit by friendly fire, Ellis's, in the darkness". Coffey's son Clarence was abraded by debris dislodged by a bullet that penetrated the tavern's kitchen. Deputy Highfill had wounds in each knee from his duty as armored-car driver.

In the cabin occupied by Parker, Jones and Clyde Barrow, they found all five of the sandwiches fetched by Jones from Slim's Castle uneaten, but all five soda bottles empty. There was a syringe kit for giving injections, leading to short-lived speculation that the Barrow Gang were all junkies, but the kit was just a remnant of the medical bag they stole from Dr. Fields several weeks before in Enid when they stole his car.

More impressive was the arsenal the gang was forced to leave behind: as many as six BARs, forty-seven Colt .45 automatic pistols—it had been a successful burglary at the Enid armory on July 7—and the personal sidearm Buck and Jones had taken off the body of Marshall Humphrey, who Buck had killed in Alma, Arkansas, on June 23.

The following day, people came to the Red Crown from all over. In its July 21 issue, The Platte County Landmark described the day-after scene as "a large crowd of sightseers" converged to get a look:

The cabins presented a torn up appearance Thursday morning, bearing many evidences of the terrible battle. Bullet holes were everywhere, through doors and windows, some from outside, some fired from inside. Mirrors and other articles in the cabins were shattered. Several bullets found their way through the station [tavern] proper but failed to hit any of the many visitors who had been warned of possible trouble and made to stay indoors."

== Aftermath ==
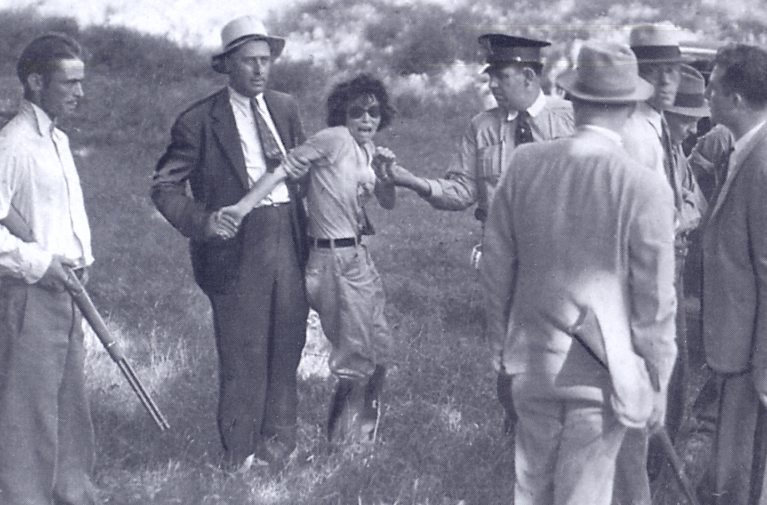
With her husband Buck dying nearby, Blanche Barrow is captured by posse at Dexfield Park, IA, where the gang had fled after the Red Crown fight

The gang's flight from the Red Crown was a slow, grim affair, a wounded car filled with wounded fugitives. It ended in Iowa, at rural Dexfield Park, a recently abandoned amusement park outside Dexter, some 170 miles due north of the tourist court. For days, local citizens were running across bloody clothes and bandages carelessly jettisoned by the gang.

On July 24, 1933, the Barrows found themselves under fire once again, surrounded by local lawmen and approximately one hundred spectators. Parker, Jones and Clyde Barrow all sustained significant injuries but escaped on foot. Buck was shot again and died five days later at Kings Daughters Hospital in Perry, Iowa, of pneumonia after surgery. Blanche was captured and taken first to Adel, Iowa, and then on to Des Moines.

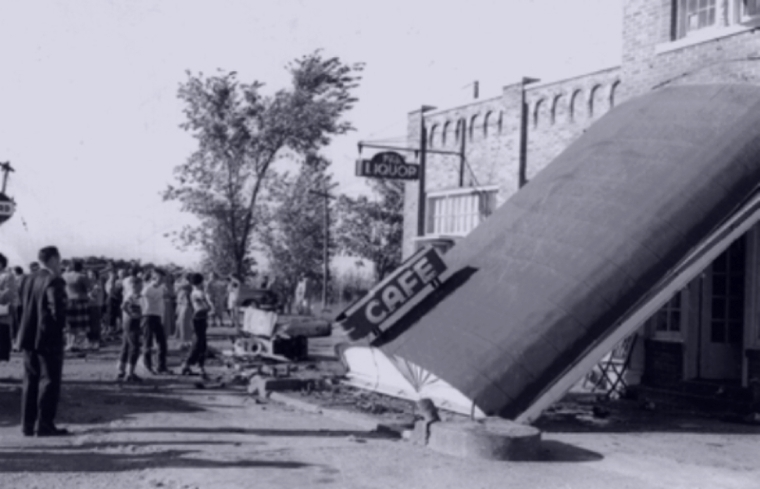
An accident, a fire, and a massive highway expansion saw the Red Crown's downfall and demolition in the late 1960s.

Coffey brought Blanche back to Platte City where she was held in the jail and questioned by law officers and FBI agents. Her selection of wardrobe was still under discussion upon her return. The Platte County Landmark asserted that she "gives evidence of careful rearing, being refined in speech and manner. ... Properly attired and groomed she would be attractive. ... " Though she had not fired a weapon during the Platte City gunfight, she was charged with assault with intent to kill Sheriff Coffey. She pleaded guilty and was sentenced to 10 years in the Missouri State Penitentiary for Women. Her sentence was commuted in 1939 and she was released. She died in 1988.

The Red Crown Tavern had been a popular attraction to locals because of its food quality, and the place became even more popular after the shootout. The Landmark's unusual take on the carnage was:

The bandit battle was a great celebration for the Red Crown and came upon its second anniversary, being just two years ago that day the tavern opened for business. The cabins, with their bullet marks and shot-up interiors have been visited by thousands.

In 1945, the Red Crown complex was purchased by former sheriff Coffey, who operated it successfully until 1950. "It was a honky tonk place," recalled George Ann Coffey, a cousin. "The women would get all dressed up and wear pretty dresses and white gloves. The men would drink beer; the women would not!"

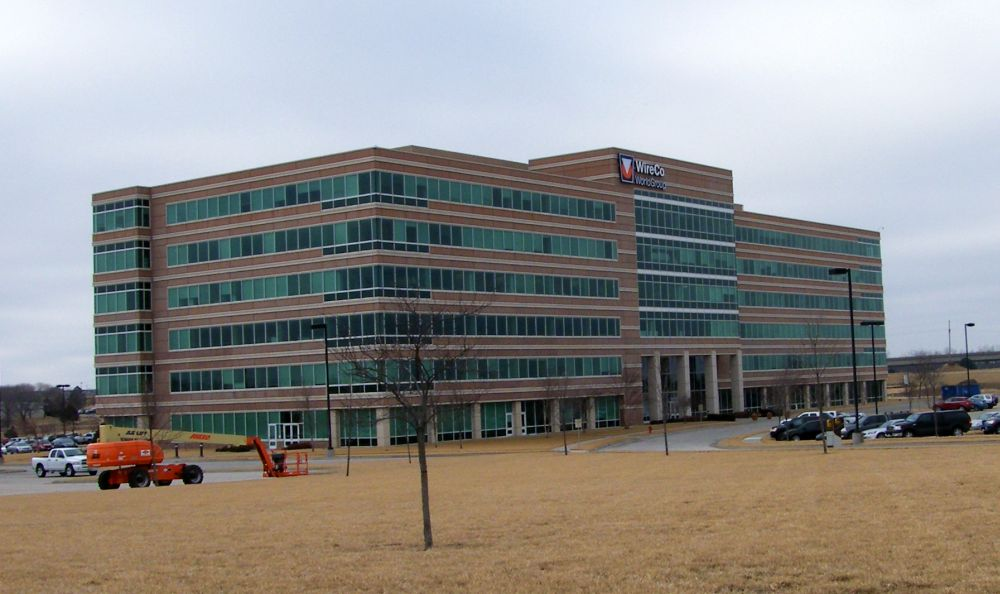
Today's WireCo WorldGroup building, on a spot that would have been behind the Red Crown.

After being in the hospitality business, Coffey went on to be elected a presiding judge of Platte County in 1956. Today, that office is referred to as county commissioner. He died in 1964 at age 72, during his first elected term.

In 1957, an accident knocked down the forecourt awning and damaged the gasoline pumps. Ten years later a fire started in the kitchen and destroyed most of the tavern. What was left standing at the site was stripped and carried off by souvenir hounds. Fueled by the renewed interest in the Barrows from the 1967 movie, merchants in Weston sold bricks from the building for $1 apiece on the street during the late 1960s. Changing highways ultimately ended the business, as the construction of access roads for the nearby interstate demanded the demolition of the Red Crown and Slim's Castle.

Demolition of the buildings occurred in 1968. As recently as 2003, an investigator for After the Battle books, Marty Black, was able to find chunks of brickwork from unidentifiable buildings deep in the thatch on the site.

The area was annexed by the city of Kansas City in 1967 when Kansas City International Airport became the city's main airport. In 1999, Farmland Industries built its headquarters slightly northeast of the Red Crown site, in a spot that would have been back behind both the tavern and the tourist court cabins. Currently that building is occupied by National Beef Packing Company, LLC.

In 2011, the Platte County Historical Society installed a historical marker near the site east of where the Red Crown once stood. The marker, which is dedicated to the lawmen who participated in the shootout, stands in the far southeastern corner of the WireCo WorldGroup parking lot.

== See also ==
- Bonnie & Clyde Garage Apartment
