= Buck Barrow =

Brother of infamous Clyde Barrow

Marvin "Buck" Barrow
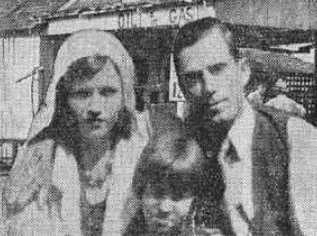
- Blanche and Buck Barrow in 1931
- Born: Marvin Ivan Barrow; March 14, 1903; Marion County, Texas, US
- Died: July 29, 1933 (aged 30); Perry, Iowa, US
- Spouse: 3rd wife: Blanche Barrow (m. 1931–33)
- Children: 3
- Status: Deceased
- Convictions: Handling of stolen goods, 2nd degree

Marvin Ivan "Buck" Barrow (March 14, 1903 – July 29, 1933) was a member of the Barrow Gang. He was the older brother of the gang's leader, Clyde Barrow. He and his wife, Blanche, were wounded in a gun battle with police four months after they joined up with Bonnie and Clyde. Buck died of his wounds soon afterwards.

== Early life ==
Marvin Ivan "Buck" Barrow was born in Jones Prairie, Marion County, Texas, the third child of Henry and Cumie Barrow. An aunt, watching the little boy "running around acting like a horse," gave him the nickname Buck. He ceased attending school around age 8 or 9 and enjoyed fishing and hunting instead.

In the early 1920s, the older Barrow children left the family farm one by one to marry and start careers in Dallas. At 18 or 19, Buck went to Dallas, ostensibly to work for his brother repairing cars, but he quickly became part of the West Dallas petty-criminal underworld. His sister Marie, barely school age when she and her parents moved to the West Dallas campground, remembered watching him put spurs on roosters for cockfighting, and his pit bull, which tore the back off her dress.

He married twice and divorced twice during this time and had three children by those marriages. Just before Christmas 1926, Buck, 23, and Clyde, 17, were arrested with a truck full of stolen turkeys they intended to sell for the holidays. Buck took the rap for himself and his brother and went to jail for a week. The turkey adventure was an ironic joke to them. At the time, Buck was making ends meet by stealing automobiles in cities all over Texas and selling them for a comfortable $100 or so to fences out of state.

On November 11, 1929, Barrow met Blanche Caldwell in West Dallas, an unincorporated part of Dallas County. They fell in love almost immediately.

On November 29, 1929, several days after meeting Blanche, Barrow was shot and captured following a burglary in Denton, Texas. He was tried, convicted, and sentenced to four years in the Texas State Prison System. On March 8, 1930, Barrow escaped from the Ferguson Prison Farm near Midway, Texas. He simply walked out of the prison, stole a guard's car, and drove to his parents' place in West Dallas, where Blanche was living.

In interviews with author/historian John Neal Phillips, Blanche was frank about the fact that she not only knew of Buck's escape but that she hid with him and actually staged robberies with him. The notion that Blanche did not know until later that Buck was an escaped convict was fabricated by the Barrow family and Blanche herself, as a means of convincing Missouri State authorities to reduce her prison sentence following her capture in July 1933.

On July 3, 1931, Blanche and Buck were married in Oklahoma. Blanche was not interested in pursuing a criminal career. She and other members of the Barrow family convinced Buck to turn himself in to Texas prison authorities and complete his sentence. Two days after Christmas 1931, his mother and his wife drove him to the gate of Huntsville penitentiary, where he told surprised prison officials that he had escaped almost two years before and needed to resume his sentence. They welcomed him in.

During his second stint at Huntsville, Buck sent repentant letters home, written for him by fellow prisoners. Almost two years into his six-year sentence, he was unexpectedly pardoned, partly as part of Texas governor Ma Ferguson's plan to decrease prison crowding and partly due to the lobbying efforts of his wife and his mother.

Upon his release, on March 22, 1933, Buck Barrow, in the company of Blanche, joined his younger brother Clyde, Bonnie Parker, and W. D. Jones in Joplin, Missouri, where he participated in several armed robberies.

== Murders ==
On April 13, 1933, Buck, Clyde, and W. D. Jones participated in a shootout with law enforcement officers at Joplin, Missouri. Two officers, Newton County Constable Wes Harryman and Joplin City Motor Detective Harry McGinnis, were killed.

On June 23, 1933, Buck and W. D. Jones killed Alma, Arkansas City Marshal Henry D. Humphrey, during a gunfight on the road between Alma and Fayetteville. Clyde Barrow was not involved in the Humphrey killing.

== Platte City and Dexfield Park ==
On July 19, 1933, Buck was mortally wounded in the head by Capt. William Baxter of the Missouri Highway Patrol during a shootout at the Red Crown Tourist Court at Platte City, Missouri. The bullet opened up a large hole in Buck's forehead that exposed his brain and caused severe loss of blood. Blanche was wounded in the same gunfight. She and her husband escaped, along with Bonnie, Clyde, and W. D. Jones. Despite his ghastly head wound and loss of blood, Buck was sometimes fully conscious and talked and ate.

On July 24, Buck, near death, was wounded six times in the back during a shootout near an abandoned amusement park between Redfield and Dexter, Iowa. Bonnie, Clyde, and W. D. Jones, all wounded in the same gunfight, escaped. Buck and Blanche were captured.

Blanche survived her wounds, though she lost sight in her left eye. Extradited to Missouri, she was tried for the attempted murder of Sheriff Holt Coffey at Platte City. She was convicted and sentenced to ten years in prison.

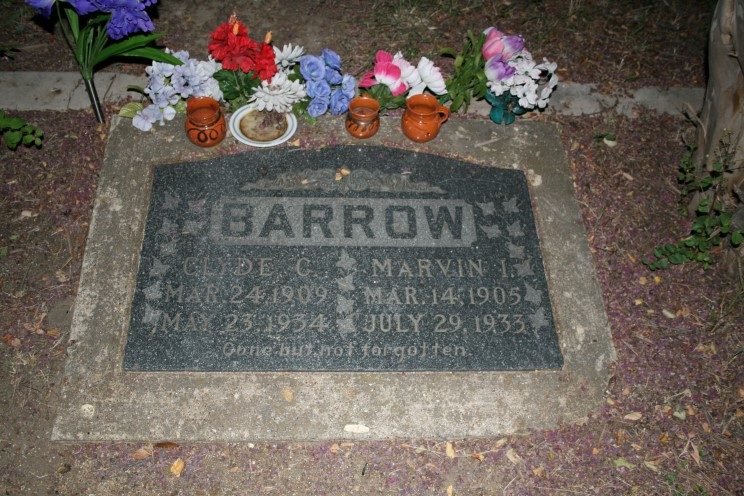
Clyde and Buck Barrow's Grave 32.7655373°N 96.8458633°W

== Hospital ==
Buck was taken to King's Daughters Hospital in Perry, Iowa. His doctors commented in their report on how clean Buck's head wound was, given the circumstances. Bonnie and Clyde had poured hydrogen peroxide into the head wound, cleaning it. On arrival, Buck was generally lucid and told doctors that aspirin helped the pain in his head, and the only real pain he felt was from his other gunshot wounds, particularly the one in his back.

That bullet, doctors discovered, had entered his back, ricocheted off a rib, and lodged in his chest wall close to the pleural cavity. Because he was in such a weakened state—his limbs had grown paralyzed from another bullet wound, and his temperature would not lower from 105—his doctors expected he would develop pneumonia from the surgery on his chest. They predicted either that or an infection of his brain from the head wound would kill him in a few days.

Lawmen visited him in the hospital to get his final statements. Though doctors kept him numb with opiates, they also injected him with stimulants at least twice so that he might answer questions. "Due to the lack of medical attention," an interrogator noted, "the wound in Barrow's head gave off such an offensive odor that it was with the utmost difficulty that one could remain within several feet of him." He agreed with Deputy Red Salyers that he had shot and killed Marshal Humphrey in Arkansas. He was able to chat with the doctor, who asked him, "Where are you wanted by the law?" "Wherever I've been," replied Buck.

== Death ==
When word of Buck's dire condition reached Texas, Dallas County Sheriff R.A. "Smoot" Schmid wrote a letter of introduction to the local authorities for Buck and Clyde's mother, Cumie, and a deputy sheriff provided money to help cover her expenses in the 36-hour drive to Iowa. She and her youngest son, L.C., arrived for Buck's last conscious days. As his pneumonia became more serious, he became delirious and slipped into a coma, from which he did not wake. He died at 2 pm on Saturday, July 29, 1933.

Henry and Cumie Barrow delayed buying a gravestone for Buck. They were sure Clyde would follow him into death any day, and whether for practical or loving reasons or a mixture of both, they decided to wait for Clyde. Clyde liked the idea and suggested the epitaph for the shared tombstone: "Gone But Not Forgotten."

Buck's year of birth is incorrect on the tombstone. His mother gave the stonecutters their sister Nell's birth year for him by accident. Cumie recorded the birth dates of all her children in the family Bible, and Buck's birth year was written as 1903.

Barrow is buried at Western Heights Cemetery in Dallas, Texas, alongside Clyde.

== Legacy ==
Barrow was portrayed by Gene Hackman in Bonnie and Clyde (1967).

He was also portrayed by Lane Garrison in the 2013 revisionist miniseries Bonnie & Clyde.

== Bibliography ==
- Barrow, Blanche Caldwell, edited by John Neal Phillips (2004). My Life with Bonnie and Clyde. Norman and London: University of Oklahoma Press. ISBN 0-8061-3625-1.
- FBI file 26-4114, four volumes of files held by the FBI that document the pursuit of the Barrow Gang. FBI Records and Information
- Guinn, Jeff (2009). Go Down Together. The True, Untold Story of Bonnie and Clyde. New York: Simon and Schuster. ISBN 1-4165-5706-7.
- Milner, E.R. (1996). The Lives and Times of Bonnie & Clyde. Carbondale: Southern Illinois University Press. ISBN 0-8093-2552-7.
- Phillips, John Neal (2002). Running with Bonnie and Clyde: The Ten Fast Years of Ralph Fults. Norman and London: University of Oklahoma Press. ISBN 0-8061-3429-1.
