= Blanche Barrow =

Member of "Bonnie and Clyde" gang

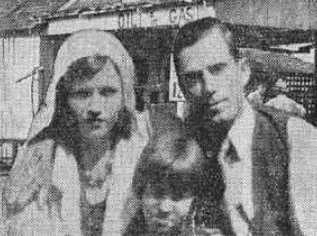
- Blanche and Buck Barrow in 1931
- Born: Bennie Iva Caldwell; January 1, 1911; Garvin, Oklahoma, U.S.
- Died: December 24, 1988 (aged 77); Dallas, Texas, U.S.
- Resting place: Grove Hill Memorial Park
- Known for: Member of the Barrow Gang
- Spouses: John Calloway (m. 1928; div. 1931) Buck Barrow (m. 1931; died 1933) Eddie Frasure (m. 1940; died 1969)
- Children: 1

Blanche Barrow (born Bennie Iva Caldwell; January 1, 1911 – December 24, 1988) was the wife of Buck Barrow, the older brother of Clyde Barrow. He became her second husband after his release from prison. To her dismay, Buck joined his brother's gang. Blanche was present at the shootout which resulted in the Barrow Gang becoming nationally recognized fugitives. She spent only four months with the gang.

Although she never used a gun, Blanche was blinded in one eye during a getaway. In the same incident, she rescued her husband under heavy police gunfire. She was caught along with her fatally wounded husband by a posse of local men in Iowa. She served six years in prison for assault with intent to kill, her target being the sheriff of Platte County, Missouri.

After Barrow's release from prison, she eventually remarried and lived quietly thereafter. Barrow was consulted for the partially fictionalized film Bonnie and Clyde (1967) about the Barrow Gang. She disliked her portrayal in the film by Estelle Parsons, who won an Academy Award for the role.

== Early life ==
Blanche Barrow was born Bennie Iva Caldwell in Garvin, Oklahoma, the only child of Matthew Fontain Caldwell and Lillian Bell Pond. At the time of her birth, her father was 39 years old and her mother was 15 years old. Her parents divorced while she was still a young child. She was raised by her father, a logger and farmer.

== Marriages ==
Barrow had a poor relationship with her mother, who arranged for her to be married to John Calloway, a much older man, at age 17.

On November 11, 1929, while hiding in Dallas County from her husband, Blanche met Buck Barrow. He was a twice-divorced criminal with children from a previous marriage, who was eight years her senior. Several days after they met, Buck was shot and captured following a burglary in Denton, Texas. He was tried, convicted, and sentenced to five years in the Texas State Prison System. On March 8, 1930, he escaped from the Ferguson Prison Farm near Midway, Texas and Blanche hid with him.

She and Buck were married and she convinced him to surrender and serve out the remainder of his prison sentence. Two days after Christmas 1931, Blanche drove him to the gate of Huntsville penitentiary, where he told surprised prison officials that he had escaped almost two years before and needed to resume his sentence. They welcomed him in. Two years later, he was released and granted a pardon which wiped out his conviction. A few days after Buck's release, Bonnie and Clyde came to visit with him and Blanche. Bonnie was visibly drunk, and Buck, who had been talking with Clyde in the car and also appeared to have been drinking, made a promise to his brother that he would join him in his gang.

This went contrary to Blanche's wishes to keep her husband out of further trouble with the law. Buck tried to convince Blanche to accompany him on a vacation trip to Joplin, Missouri with Bonnie and Clyde. He explained that his intention was to persuade his brother to keep out of trouble, but still she refused to hear of it. Only when Buck threatened to leave her behind did she agree, saying that she was afraid that Clyde would drive a wedge between them.

== Barrow Gang ==
Blanche and Buck spent three weeks relaxing in the two-garage apartments with the gang of Bonnie, Clyde, and Clyde's seventeen-year-old sidekick William Daniel "W.D." Jones. The apartment building exists today at 3347 1/2 Oak Ridge Drive in Joplin, Newton County, Missouri, though it actually fronts on 34th Street, and is registered on the National Register of Historic Places. While Blanche agreed to travel with Bonnie and Clyde, she was not overly fond of them. The group passed time playing cards, doing puzzles, and drinking newly legalized beer. Clyde Barrow parked his stolen car in the left side of the double garage beneath the two apartments while Blanche and Buck had to rent space at a nearby house for their car as a neighbor had the right-side spot already. Blanche and Bonnie would go to the movies or shop for knick-knacks at Kress' store, but, to her chagrin, she ended up doing much of the cooking and washing for the others.

Bickering steadily increased during the four months Blanche and Buck spent with Bonnie and Clyde. Since Buck was accustomed to deference from his younger brother, he had difficulty accepting Clyde as the group's leader. It also stemmed from the enforced proximity and Blanche's resentment at being used as the gang's factotum.

The gang's loud, drunken card games and an accidental discharge of a Browning Automatic Rifle by Clyde led to neighbors reporting suspicious men to law enforcement and local police began watching the apartment. After a while, a raid was organized for April 13, 1933. Two armed carloads of local police pulled up to confront what was suspected of being just a group of bootleggers. The gang had been on the verge of leaving that day. Clyde responded to the police by instantly opening fire. Two of the policemen were killed, while others took cover from the automatic weapons wielded by the gang.

Blanche was pulled into the getaway car, having run down the street after her dog. She later wrote that when being driven away, she felt "all my hopes and dreams tumbling down around me." Buck had gone from accompanying the gang to being part of its illegal activity when he, W.D. and Clyde stole cars and committed stick-ups to replenish their cash. Left behind were documents that identified her and Buck, including their marriage license. They were now publicly exposed as being part of "The Barrow Gang," and associated with the killing of two police officers.

Also left behind were undeveloped rolls of film. The police had the local newspaper develop them and photos of Bonnie pointing a gun at Clyde and other provocative poses caused a sensation. One picture showed Bonnie sticking her leg up on a car fender, clutching a pistol, and clenching one of W.D.'s cigars in her teeth as she glared into the camera. It was not understood that this and the other photos were taken as satirical fun. The pictures were sent out over the wires and widely printed, creating a shocking image of a violent gangster and his cigar-chomping moll that made national celebrities of them.

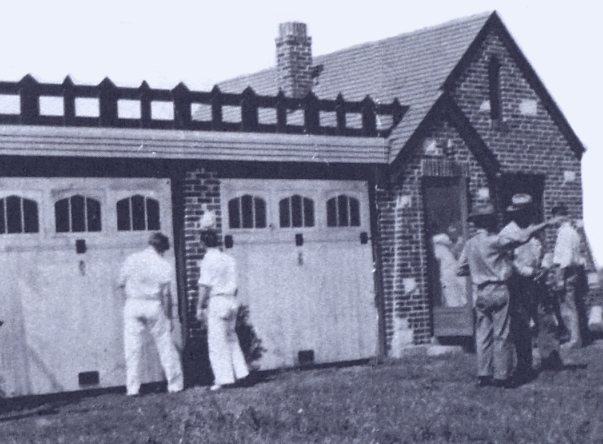
The two-unit Red Crown Tourist Court. Using his cabin's internal connecting door, Clyde entered the garage from where he fired with a Browning Automatic Rifle (BAR). 39.31194°N 94.68639°W

On July 18, 1933, the gang stopped for the night at the Red Crown Tourist Court, attached to the Red Crown Tavern in Platte County, Missouri. The tavern, unknown to them, was a popular daytime meeting place for local law enforcement of various agencies to eat and compare notes on local crime. They quickly attracted attention. N.D. Houser, proprietor of the tavern and cabins which Blanche rented, became suspicious of Blanche because of her jodhpur pants, unusually tight and provocative when any pants were considered daring for women of that era, and because she paid the $4 rental in coins. He also saw Clyde back his car into the Court's garage, a habit associated with criminals preparing for fast getaways.

His suspicions were heightened over the night and next day when Blanche said she was renting the apartments for three people, but repeatedly ordered five servings of food when buying takeout meals at his tavern. Houser eventually informed police of his guests and the license plate number of Clyde's stolen car: Oklahoma plate 75-782. By midday, the license plate had identified them and enabled Sheriff Holt Coffey to get assistance from Kansas City Sheriff Tom Bash, as well as the Platte City police chief and local prosecutor David Clevenger. Clyde, having taped newspapers across his cabin windows to keep hidden, was unable to see the growing police activity around the tavern as various agencies formed an assault team.

At 1:00 am on July 20, 1933, Sheriff Coffey, leading the posse and bearing a steel, bullet-proof shield, knocked on one of the gang's two cabin doors, announced he was law enforcement and said he needed to speak to them. Blanche's response of "just a minute" was a prearranged code which alerted Clyde, who went into the garage, where he could see Coffey through a glass panel in the door. Clyde fired a Browning Automatic Rifle M1918, a military-grade automatic rifle, at Coffey, who dove away amid a barrage of gunfire from the BAR in front and responding fire from the posse behind him, which wounded him. Clyde also fired rounds from the Browning at an armored police sedan parked across the garage doors to block their cars in. The bullets penetrated and wounded the officer behind the wheel, George Highfill, in both knees, forcing him to back away from the front of the garage doors, thereby freeing an escape route for the gang's car.

Blanche and Buck had to leave the cover of their cabin, as it had no interior door leading into the garage, as did the cabin occupied by Clyde. Exposed, they were targeted by the posse's gunfire. Buck fell with a through-and-through wound entering his left temple, the bullet traveling the inner surface of the front portion of his skull, and out of his right temple. Bonnie and Clyde stopped, and while under fire, helped Blanche drag Buck into the car and drove away under a barrage of fire, which shattered the car windows. Glass splinters penetrated and blinded Blanche's left eye and damaged her right. The apartments and tavern location is now covered by highway lanes approaching the Kansas City airport. The exact apartment site is on an entrance ramp. At 12118 N Ambassador Dr, Kansas City, MO 64163, a plaque memorializes the nearby incident.

The fleeing criminals eventually acquired another car without bullet holes. They camped near an overgrown dead-end road near the abandoned Dexfield amusement park in Dexter, Iowa. Buck's injuries were too severe to permit them to leave. Within four days they were spotted and identified. With the road covered, a 50-member posse, mainly townspeople armed with shotguns and hunting rifles, approached the camp soon after dawn. Clyde and Jones opened fire, but were quickly outgunned and wounded. With their cars wrecked, they abandoned the heavy BARs and ran.

== Capture ==
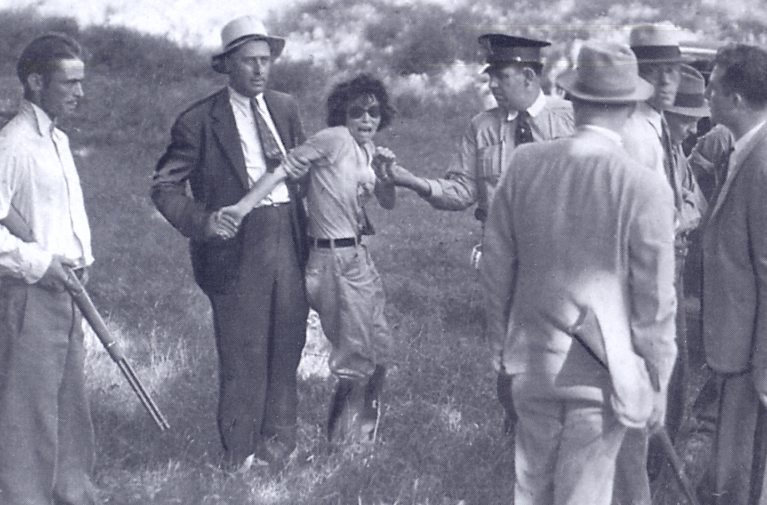
Blanche Barrow, not long after her capture, July 1933

Buck collapsed due to his previous wound. He traded fire but was shot by the posse. Blanche, who by this time had been wounded by shotgun pellets in the abdomen, stayed with him and was arrested. A photograph shows a distraught Blanche moments after she was pulled away from Buck, who is lying yards to the right.

Due to her impaired vision, she thought the camera taking her picture was a gun, and screamed, expecting that she and Buck were about to be summarily shot. Blanche and Buck were taken to a doctor, who asked Buck where he was wanted by the law. Buck, whose brain was protruding from the infected wound that would soon kill him, replied, "Everywhere I've been."

W.D. Jones, carrying the disabled Bonnie and accompanied by Clyde, who had an arm wound, crawled into thick brush, where the posse was unwilling to follow. The capture of Blanche and Buck distracted the posse, allowing the three remaining fugitives to cross the river, where they stole a car and made their escape.

Blanche, who later testified that she accompanied the gang solely to be with her husband, apparently gave the authorities no useful information. It was only in 1935 that she and other family members of Bonnie and Clyde were tried for "harboring". Sent to Platte County, Missouri, she was charged with attempting to murder Sheriff Holt Coffey during the Platte City shootout, despite the fact he was wounded by the posse, not the Barrow gang. Blanche found Coffey remarkably sympathetic, but later claimed that, while interrogating her, J. Edgar Hoover had threatened to gouge out her remaining good eye.

== Imprisonment ==
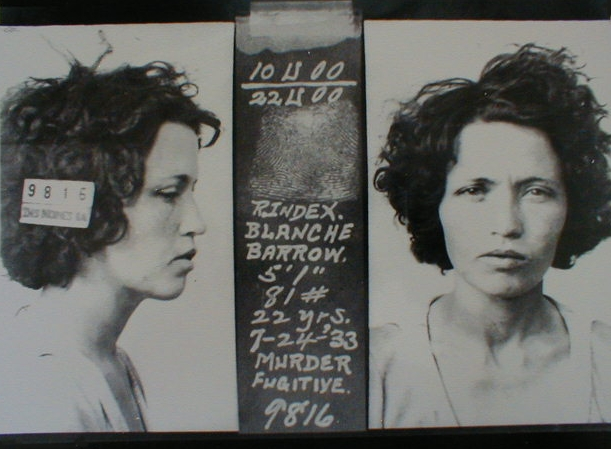
July 27, 1933 — She was in prison until 1939.

While in prison, Blanche spent much of her time in her prison camp and the prison hospital. She quickly befriended other inmates, including Irene McCann and Edna Murray, the "kissing bandit." Blanche used her time in prison to practice her photography skills, pen her memoir, and start her scrapbooks. Much of her sentence was marred by severe difficulties with her eye, which required extensive treatment from the prison doctor. She eventually lost all sight in her eye, which she blamed on Harry S. Truman, claiming he would not allow her to see another specialist about her injured eye.

Blanche maintained correspondence with several young men while in prison. She saved many of their letters in her scrapbooks, with most relationships with these boyfriends being relatively short-lived. Meanwhile, Bonnie and Clyde met their end on Louisiana State Highway 154 south of Gibsland, and Jones tried to live a low, normal life picking cotton in Houston, but was recognized and incarcerated.

During her time in prison and after her parole, she remained in close contact with Coffey and his family and Platte County prosecutor David Clevenger. She was paroled after six years, the same time served by Jones, who had killed more than once.

== Life after release ==
Immediately after her release in 1939, Blanche moved to Oklahoma to help take care of her father. Her relationship with her mother had quickly deteriorated, eventually leading to a complete break. Blanche stayed only briefly in Oklahoma, moving to Dallas, Texas in 1939, working various jobs. In 1940, at 29, she married 27-year-old Eddie Frasure. One year later, she completed her parole. Police continued to monitor her whereabouts and she was often contacted when arriving in a new city. In later life, she said Bonnie and Clyde seemed like characters in a book she had read.

Blanche and her husband wanted children, but she suffered a number of miscarriages. In 1965, they adopted a 12-year-old boy named Rickey. Blanche had a complicated relationship with him as he grew older, especially after her husband died of cancer on November 5, 1969. After her third husband's death, Blanche did not remarry. She died of lung cancer on December 24, 1988 at age 77. According to her memoir published in 2004, My Life with Bonnie and Clyde, she was buried in Dallas' Grove Hill Memorial Park as Iva Bennie “Blanche” Caldwell Frasure.

== Reaction to the film Bonnie and Clyde ==
Although she was consulted by the makers of Bonnie and Clyde, especially actor Warren Beatty, with whom she became friendly, the film's characterization of Blanche was not the slim, bravely devoted wife in her early twenties that Blanche had actually been during her time with the gang. Her character was altered to be heavily inspired by Mary O'Dare, Raymond Hamilton's girlfriend at the time. On April 10, 1968, Estelle Parsons won the Academy Award for Best Supporting Actress for her portrayal of Blanche. "That movie made me look like a screaming horse's ass." Barrow later said.

In a 2013 mini-series, Blanche was played by Sarah Hyland. In Frank Wildhorn's Broadway musical depicting the Barrow Gang, Blanche was played by Melissa van der Schyff. The run of the musical in London's West End featured Natalie McQueen and Jodie Steele as Blanche.

== Sources ==
- Barrow, Blanche Caldwell; Phillips, John Neal (2004). My Life with Bonnie and Clyde. Norman, Oklahoma and London: University of Oklahoma Press. ISBN 0-8061-3625-1.
- Guinn, Jeff (2009). Go Down Together: The True, Untold Story of Bonnie and Clyde. New York: Simon and Schuster. ISBN 978-1-4165-5718-0.
- Phillips, John Neal (2002) [1996]. Running with Bonnie and Clyde: The Ten Fast Years of Ralph Fults. Norman, Oklahoma and London: University of Oklahoma Press. ISBN 0-8061-2810-0.
