= Bonnie & Clyde Garage Apartment =

- U.S. National Register of Historic Places
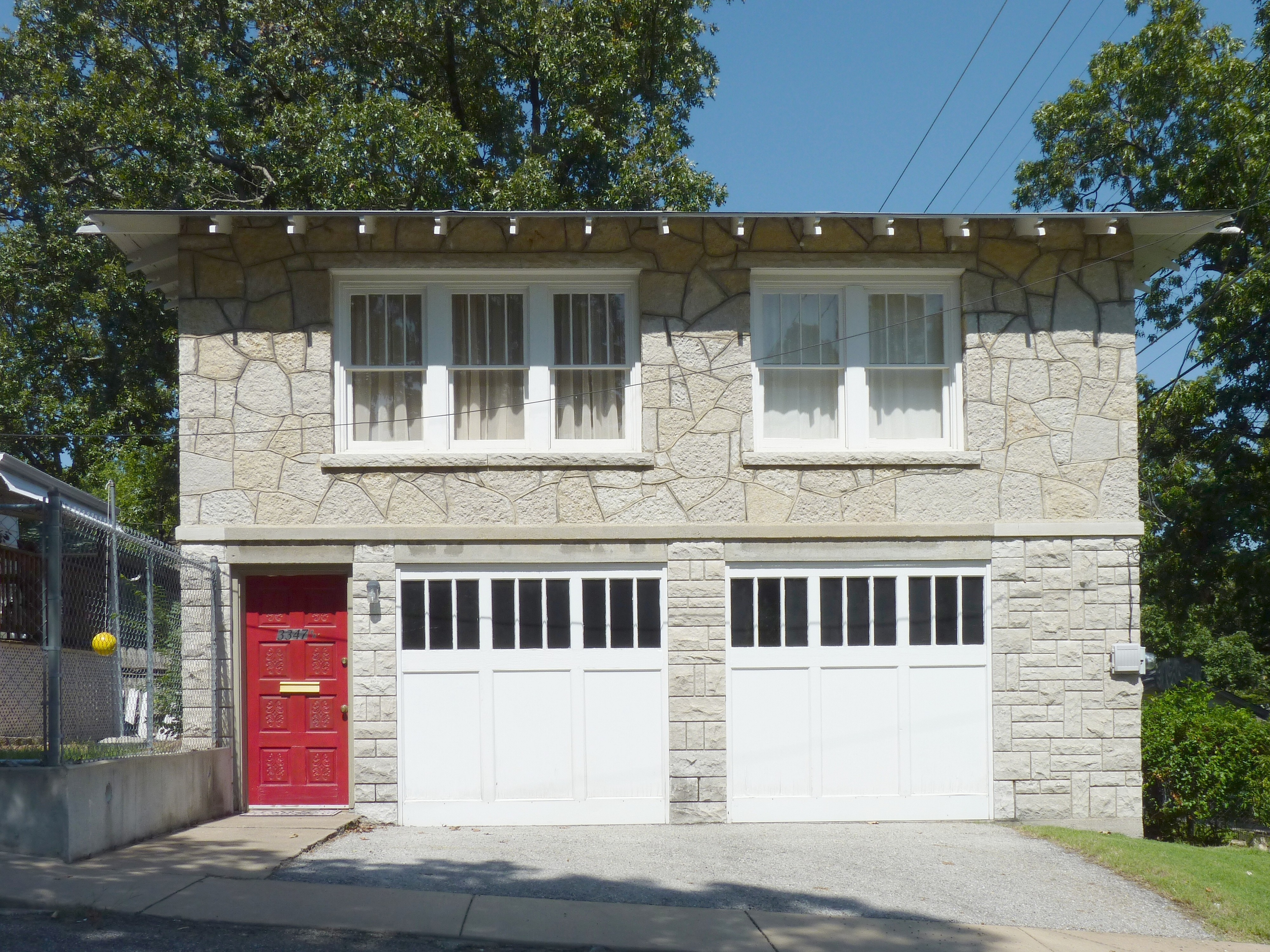

- Location within Missouri Location within the United States
- Location: 3347½ Oak Ridge Dr., Joplin, Missouri
- Coordinates: 37°3′5.9616″N 94°31′0.1776″W
- Area: less than one acre
- Built: c. 1927
- Architectural style: Bungalow/craftsman
- NRHP reference No.: 09000302
- Added to NRHP: May 15, 2009

The Bonnie and Clyde Garage Apartment is a garage apartment located at 3347½ Oak Ridge Drive in Joplin, Newton County, Missouri. Its front door opens onto 34th Street. It was built in about 1927, and is a two-story building on a poured concrete foundation. It has a gently pitched hipped roof, and has exposed rafter ends in the American Craftsman style.

== Barrow Gang ==
The apartment was the location where the Barrow Gang hid out after a series of robberies in Missouri and neighboring states. The group passed time playing cards, doing puzzles, and drinking newly legalized beer. Clyde Barrow parked his stolen car in the left side of the double garage beneath the two apartments while Blanche and Buck had to rent space at a nearby house for their car as a neighbor had the right-side spot already. Blanche and Bonnie would go to the movies or shop for knick-knacks at Kress' store. Blanche ended up doing much of the cooking and washing for the others.

After twelve days, neighbors reported suspicious behavior to the authorities. The gang's loud, drunken card games and an accidental discharge of a Browning Automatic Rifle by Clyde led to neighbors reporting suspicious men to law enforcement and local police began watching the building. A raid was then organized for April 13, 1933, when two armed carloads of local police pulled up to confront what they had suspected to be just a group of bootleggers. The gang had been on the verge of leaving that day. Clyde responded to the police by instantly opening fire. Two of the policemen were killed, while others took cover from the automatic weapons wielded by the gang.

Undeveloped photographs, left behind by the gang, helped the authorities eventually stop the gang. Stolen merchandise conclusively tied the gang to a robbery in Joplin during their stay there.

The property was added to the National Register of Historic Places (NRHP) in May 2009.
