= Holt Coffey =

American politician

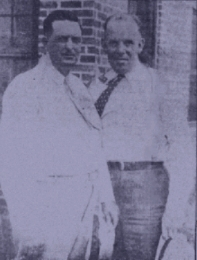
- Sheriff Coffey, (left), with his ally in the Red Crown Court confrontation with Bonnie and Clyde, Capt. William Baxter of the Missouri Highway Patrol
- Born: August 2, 1891
- Died: January 9, 1964 (aged 72)
- Occupation: Police officer
- Known for: Fights with Bonnie and Clyde

Holt Coffey (August 2, 1891 – January 9, 1964) was the sheriff of Platte County, Missouri from 1933 until 1937 and again from 1941 until 1945. Coffey, along with newly elected Platte City Prosecutor David Clevenger, was responsible for cleaning up much of the small-time crime around Platte County, a suburb of freewheeling Kansas City, Missouri.

On July 18, 1933, during Coffey's first term as sheriff, Bonnie and Clyde and three other gang members checked into the Red Crown Tourist Court south of Platte City. The conspicuous behavior of the gang caught Coffey's and others' interest, and on July 20, a ferocious firefight between the Barrows and twelve officers injured both Coffey and his twenty-year-old son Clarence (who was a U.S. Army Pharmacist's mate second class during World War II). While Clarence suffered a wound in his arm that at one time was considered life-threatening, the elder Coffey sought no treatment for his minor wounds. The Barrows escaped and were cornered and engaged again by another posse five days later in Iowa.

An expert marksman, Coffey was also a one-time minor-league baseball player. The Coffey family maintained a close relationship with Blanche Barrow, sister-in-law of Clyde, with Blanche claiming the Coffeys were more kind than her own family.

Coffey went on to own and operate the Red Crown Tavern from 1945 to 1950. He became a county commissioner in 1956. He died at age 72 in 1964.
