= Composite character =

Fictional character based on more than one individual from a story

In a work of media adapted from a real or fictional narrative, a composite character is a character based on more than one individual from the story. It is an example of dramatic license.

== Examples ==
=== Film ===
- The Wizard of Oz (1939): Glinda, Good Witch of the North is based on Glinda the Good from The Wonderful Wizard of Oz and on The Good Witch of the North from the same book.
- Lawrence of Arabia (1962): Claude Rains as diplomat Mr. Dryden. As with Omar Sharif's Sheriff Ali and Anthony Quayle's Colonel Harry Brighton, Dryden was an amalgam of several historical figures, primarily Ronald Storrs, a member of the Arab Bureau but also David Hogarth, an archaeologist friend of Lawrence, Henry McMahon, the High Commissioner of Egypt who negotiated the McMahon–Hussein Correspondence (which began the Arab Revolt), and Mark Sykes, of the Sykes–Picot Agreement, which partitioned the post-war Middle East. Screenwriter Robert Bolt stated that the character was created to "represent the civilian and political wing of British interests, to balance Allenby's military objectives".
- The Great Escape (1963): The characters in this John Sturges film are based on real men, and in some cases are composites of several men. The main character, Capt. Virgil Hilts (Steve McQueen) a.k.a. the "Cooler King", was based on at least three pilots: Bill Ash, David M. Jones, and John Dortch Lewis.
- Bonnie and Clyde (1967): C.W. Moss (Michael J. Pollard) in Arthur Penn's film is a composite of two Barrow Gang members: W. D. Jones and Henry Methvin. In the film, the Moss characterization relies predominantly on the basis of Jones, a juvenile devotee adept at carjacking, whom the couple take under their wing up until the climax. Then, traits of minor but catalytic member Methvin are interwoven near the end as his father, via Moss's dad, bargains with vengeful law enforcement for his son's immunity in exchange for luring the unsuspecting Clyde Barrow and Bonnie Parker into the fatal, bullet-ridden ambush.
- Spaceballs (1987): The protagonist of Mel Brooks's parody of Star Wars is Lone Starr (Bill Pullman), a mercenary who gains the powers of the Schwartz. Lone Starr combines the characters of both Luke Skywalker and Han Solo.
- Schindler's List (1993): Steven Spielberg's film contains one blended composite character. Although Ben Kingsley's character of accountant Itzhak Stern is based upon a real person and he did interact with Oskar Schindler (Liam Neeson), in the film Stern also absorbed aspects of a few other historical figures: Abraham Bankier, who planted the seed with Schindler to employ Jews for cheaper labor, thereby keeping them safe; and Mietek Pemper, who was at the Kraków-Płaszów concentration camp and later worked for Amon Göth (Ralph Fiennes) as his personal secretary. He was instrumental in persuading Schindler to utilize Jews in assembling war materials. A possible fourth person in the mix is Marcel Goldberg, a corrupt Jewish cop who nonetheless aided Stern in the expansion of their lists, which kept thousands of Jews alive and safe. (In Steven Zaillian's screenplay, Goldberg and Pemper have minor roles played by other actors, but nevertheless are still considered to be part of this composite.)
- Apollo 13 (1995): Henry Hurt (Xander Berkeley) in director Ron Howard's docudrama is portrayed as a NASA public relations employee assigned to assuaging Marilyn Lovell (Kathleen Quinlan)—the wife of astronaut Jim Lovell (Tom Hanks)—while simultaneously tasked with answering reporters' questions. This character is a composite of the NASA protocol officer Bob McMurrey, assigned to act as a buffer between the Lovell family and the press; and several Office of Public Liaison employees, whose job was to actually work with the press.
- Charlotte Gray (2001): Cate Blanchett's titled character is based on many SOE agents such as Pearl Witherington, Nancy Wake, Odette Hallowes and Violette Szabo.
- Catch Me If You Can (2002): In yet another Spielberg film, based on the true story of Frank Abagnale Jr. (Leonardo DiCaprio) and his counterfeit escapades, the main character is pursued by FBI agent Carl Hanratty, played by Tom Hanks. However, his character is a mixture of several agents, primarily Joseph Shea, who didn't want his name used in any film adaptation—a request Abagnale and the film crew honored after he died.
- 21 (2008): Director Robert Luketic's characters were fictionalized; in some instances, with whitewashed versions of their real-life counterparts, stirring controversy. Jeff Ma, whose saga was the main focus, was accused of being a race-traitor, in allowing Jim Sturgess to be cast as his facsimile. But it's Kevin Spacey's Micky Rosa who is a composite of John Chang, Bill Kaplan, and J.P. Masser.
- Dallas Buyers Club (2013): Screenwriters Craig Borten and Melisa Wallack told the true story of Ron Woodroof (Matthew McConaughey), who contracted AIDS and smuggled unapproved drugs to help alleviate symptoms of his and fellow sufferers, such as trans woman Rayon (Jared Leto). The latter character was actually a composite derived from a plethora of interviews with anonymous real-life transgender AIDS patients. Further embellishments were made in creating Dr. Eve Saks (Jennifer Garner), who was another composite comprised from several doctors—with one, Dr. Linda Laubenstein, being the main source of inspiration, for her activism against the social stigma of the disease.
- Molly's Game (2017): Michael Cera's Player X is based on celebrity gamblers who attended Bloom's games, such as Leonardo DiCaprio, Ben Affleck, and Tobey Maguire.
- Dunkirk (2017): Kenneth Branagh's Commander Bolton, in Christopher Nolan's World War II film is a composite of several real-life people, including Commander James Campbell Clouston and Captain Bill Tennant.
- Bombshell (2019): Margot Robbie's Kayla Pospisil was an amalgamation, based on a number of conservative women who spoke to the filmmakers about harassment from Roger Ailes (John Lithgow). "We're not revealing the people we talk to. We're trying to protect them," director Jay Roach said of the project's sources.
- Sense and Sensibility (2026): combines Colonel Brandon's childhood sweetheart turned sister-in-law Eliza Brandon and her illegitmate daughter/his ward Eliza Williams into one character. In this version of the story, Mr. Willoughby seduces the elder Eliza under the impression that she will inherit her husband's home instead of Colonel Brandon and abandons her while pregnant rather than doing the same to the younger Eliza as he does in the book.

=== Television ===
- Ulana Khomyuk in Chernobyl was created to represent "the many scientists who worked fearlessly and put themselves in a lot of danger to help solve the situation."
- Game of Thrones made extensive use of composite characters due to the sheer number of characters from A Song of Ice and Fire. Sansa Stark in the show takes on elements from her friend Jenye Poole (who briefly appears in the first season) such as being married off to Ramsay Bolton so Bolton can gain control of Winterfell. The character of Gendry is an amalgamation of Robert Baratheon's numerous illegitimate children from the source material. He is given a storyline that is a combination of book Gendry's and his half-brother Edric Storm, who was sent off to protect him from being ritualistically sacrificed by his uncle Stannis Baratheon. Both the Seaworth and Tyrell families go from having multiple sons in the books (seven and three, respectively) to one who combines aspects of the others in the show. More controversially, Ellaria Sand became a composite of many of the Dornish women introduced in A Feast for Crows who were either entirely cut out or severely reduced in terms of importance to the story. She alone plays the roles that her four daughters, four stepdaughters, and niece Arianne Martell (heir to Dorne) do in the books. The prequel show House of the Dragon also makes use of this adaptational device. Rhaena Targaryen becomes a composite of herself and Nettles from the source novel Fire & Blood. Nettles is allegedly a girl of illegitimate Targaryen ancestry and supporter of Rhaenyra Targaryen who claims the dragon Sheep Stealer. The youngest of Rhaneyra's half-brothers Daeron Targaryen also borrows from a character known as "Young Griff" from the novels who never appeared in Game of Thrones. Young Griff is a boy raised in exile by his surrogate father Jon Connington that claims to be Aegon Targaryen, Daenerys's nephew, who was believed to have been killed during the sack of King's Landing along with his mother Elia Martell and older sister Rhaenys. Young Griff claims to have been swapped with another boy and spirited away by Varys for his own safety during the sack. He claims to have dyed his Valyrian white blonde hair to remain inconspicuous while in hiding. In House of the Dragon, Daeron has been raised as a ward by his mother's relatives in Oldtown (as he did in the books) and when called to return home by his sister Rhaenyra after she takes the city, has been swapped with another boy who had his hair dyed white blonde while Daeron remains in Oldtown.
- Colin Hanks as Barry Lapidus in The Offer was based on many executives at Gulf & Western that Ruddy dealt with during the production of The Godfather.
- The Tudors (2007): Henry VIII's sisters Margaret Tudor and Mary Tudor, Queen of France were amalgamated into one character named Margaret. The character of Margaret's story more closely matches Mary's life. She is a known beauty who was married off by her brother to an older King to form an alliance (in real life the King of France, in the show it's Portugal), only to be quickly widowed and marry her brother's best friend Charles Brandon, 1st Duke of Suffolk behind his back. However, the creators of the show decided to call the character Margaret instead of Mary to avoid confusion with their niece Mary I of England. Margaret was played by Gabrielle Anwar.
- Once Upon a Time (2011–2018): Gabrielle Anwar portrayed Rapunzel Tremaine, also known as Victoria Belfrey, who is a composite between Rapunzel and the Wicked Stepmother from Cinderella.

=== Literature ===
- The three Herods in the Gospel of Luke and the Acts of the Apostles (Herod the Great (Luke 1:5), Herod Antipas (Luke 3:1; 9:7-9; 13:31-33; 23:5-12), and Herod Agrippa I (Acts 12:1-23)) are three separate historical rulers, but are portrayed as a single character in Herod as a Composite Character in Luke-Acts, described "as an actualization of Satan's desire to impede the spread of the good news though his ["Herod's"] rejection of the gospel message and through political persecution".
- The Senator: My Ten Years with Ted Kennedy, a memoir by Richard E. Burke allegedly exposing various activities of U.S. Senator Ted Kennedy featured several composite characters associated with Kennedy's alleged drug use and sexual dalliances; the inclusion of such became a point of criticism for the book.
- Bring Up the Bodies (2012): In the afterwards of the book, author Hilary Mantel acknowledges that Jane Boleyn's role as the main instigator of the downfall of her sister-in-law Anne Boleyn is a composite of the actions of several different people. In particular, Jane was given elements of a woman named Bridget Wingfield's participation in the scandal. Wingfield was an employee of Anne's and is believed to have been the individual who started the rumors that she was having an extramarital affair. Mantel decided to give Jane an outsized role both because Wingfield died mid-scandal and to keep the reader from having to keep yet another character straight.

=== Journalism ===
- A series of 1944 The New Yorker articles by Joseph Mitchell on New York's Fulton Fish Market which were presented as journalism. Once the stories were published in 1948 as the book Old Mr. Flood Mitchell disclosed that "Mr. Flood is not one man; combined in him are aspects of several old men who work or hang out in Fulton Fish Market, or who did in the past." Mitchell assigned his composite character his own birthday and his own love for the Bible and certain authors. In his introduction to Mr. Flood, Mitchell wrote, "I wanted these stories to be truthful rather than factual, but they are solidly based on facts."
- John Hersey is said to have created a composite character in a Life magazine story, as did Alastair Reid for The New Yorker.
- Vivian Gornick in 2003 said that she used composite characters in some of her articles for the Village Voice.

== See also ==
- Fictional character
- Fictional location
