= Bonnie & Clyde (miniseries) =

- Genre: Historical fiction
- Written by: John Rice; Joe Batteer
- Directed by: Bruce Beresford
- Starring: Emile Hirsch; Holliday Grainger; Sarah Hyland; Elizabeth Reaser; Holly Hunter; William Hurt
- Theme music composer: John Debney
- Country of origin: United States
- Original language: English
- No. of episodes: 2

Production
- Producers: David A. Rosemont; Craig Zadan; Neil Meron
- Cinematography: Francis Kenny
- Editors: John David Allen; David Beatty
- Running time: 174 minutes (two parts)
- Production company: Sony Pictures Television

Original release
- Network: A&E; History; Lifetime
- Release: December 8 – December 9, 2013

Bonnie & Clyde is a revisionist 2013 miniseries about Great Depression-era outlaws Bonnie Parker and Clyde Barrow starring Emile Hirsch as Clyde Barrow and Holliday Grainger as Bonnie Parker. The two-part series aired on consecutive nights, December 8 and 9, 2013, simultaneously on A&E, History, and Lifetime (all owned by A&E Networks). The first previews were released on September 23, 2013. The series was widely criticized for its historical inaccuracies, particularly as it was aired on History.

== Plot ==
The two-part television series is based on the true story of Clyde Barrow and Bonnie Parker. Barrow, a charismatic convicted armed robber, sweeps Parker – a young and impressionable, petite, small-town waitress, who is already married – off her feet. In the early 1930s, the two embark on one of the most infamous crime sprees in American history.

Part 1: Tells the story of Clyde Barrow's childhood growing up in rural Texas with his older brother Buck as they steal chickens, and later they do a stint in prison for stealing bigger and better things. After Buck ends up incarcerated again, Clyde meets the love of his life Bonnie Parker, who dreams of becoming a movie star in Hollywood. Soon the couple goes on a crime spree, robbing banks together after Clyde's partner is caught. They are able to stay one step ahead of the "laws" while they rob bigger banks in the state.

Part 2: Clyde asks his newlywed brother Buck to help them. Not wanting to be alone at home, his wife Blanche becomes the fourth member of the Barrow Gang. However, Bonnie pushes Clyde to commit more dangerous crimes and rob banks across the state line to generate headlines in the newspapers, and their life of crime soon leads to their deaths.

== Cast ==
- Emile Hirsch as Clyde Barrow, bank robber and getaway driver
- Holliday Grainger as Bonnie Parker, married waitress turned bank robber
- Lane Garrison as Marvin "Buck" Barrow, Clyde's older brother
- Sarah Hyland as Blanche Barrow, Buck's young wife who is a member of the Barrow Gang
- Holly Hunter as Emma Parker, Bonnie's mother
- William Hurt as Frank Hamer, retired Texas Ranger called out of retirement to track down and capture Bonnie and Clyde
- Austin Hebert as Ted Hinton, Dallas County, Texas, Deputy Sheriff and posse member of Bonnie and Clyde's capture
- Elizabeth Reaser as P.J. Lane, The Herald newspaper reporter who wrote about Bonnie and Clyde's crime spree
- Desmond Phillips as Ray Hamilton, bank robber and first member of Bonnie and Clyde's gang
- Aaron Jay Rome as Ralph Fults, outlaw and escape artist of the Barrow Gang
- Garrett Kruithof as Henry Methvin, bank robber and last member of the Barrow Gang
- Jonathan Vane as Captain Harley Grace

== Reception ==
=== Ratings ===
Part 1 of Bonnie & Clyde delivered 9.8 million total viewers simulcast on three networks. This is cable's best miniseries opening in ratings since 2006's Broken Trail, outside of History's Hatfields & McCoys and The Bible. A&E Networks closed out its two-part miniseries with 7.4 million viewers.

=== Awards ===
- Nominated – Critics' Choice Television Award for Best Miniseries
- Nominated – Critics' Choice Television Award for Best Actress in a Movie/Miniseries: Holliday Grainger
- Nominated – Satellite Award for Best Actress – Miniseries or Television Film: Holliday Grainger
- Nominated – Satellite Award for Best Supporting Actor – Series, Miniseries or Television Film: William Hurt
- Nominated – Primetime Emmy Award for Outstanding Miniseries
- Nominated – Primetime Emmy Award for Outstanding Hairstyling for a Miniseries or Movie
- Nominated – Primetime Emmy Award for Outstanding Makeup for a Miniseries or Movie (Non-Prosthetic)
- Nominated – Primetime Emmy Award for Outstanding Sound Editing for a Miniseries, Movie, or Special

== See also ==
- Barrow Gang
- Hybristophilia
