= Timeless (American TV series) =

American television series (2016–2018)

- Genre: Drama; Science fiction; Action; Alternate history
- Created by: Eric Kripke; Shawn Ryan
- Starring: Abigail Spencer; Matt Lanter; Malcolm Barrett; Paterson Joseph; Sakina Jaffrey; Claudia Doumit; Goran Višnjić
- Composer: Robert Duncan
- Country of origin: United States
- No. of seasons: 2
- No. of episodes: 28

Production
- Executive producers: Shawn Ryan; Eric Kripke; Arika Lisanne Mittman; Tom Smuts; John Davis; John Fox; Marney Hochman; Neil Marshall
- Producers: Brad Van Arragon; Jim Barnes; Lana Cho; Shawn Williamson
- Production locations: Vancouver, British Columbia, Canada (season 1); Los Angeles, California, US (season 2)
- Cinematography: Sam McCurdy
- Editors: Debbie Berman; David Kaldor
- Camera setup: Single-camera
- Running time: 43 minutes
- Production companies: MiddKid Productions; Kripke Enterprises; Davis Entertainment; Universal Television; Sony Pictures Television

Original release
- Network: NBC
- Release: October 3, 2016 – December 20, 2018

Timeless is an American science fiction drama television series that premiered on NBC on October 3, 2016. It stars Abigail Spencer, Matt Lanter, and Malcolm Barrett as a team that attempts to stop a mysterious organization from changing the course of history through time travel. The series was created by Shawn Ryan and Eric Kripke, and also stars Sakina Jaffrey, Paterson Joseph, Claudia Doumit, and Goran Višnjić. The executive producers include John Davis and John Fox of The Blacklist.

Although NBC canceled the series after one season, the series was renewed three days later following negotiations with Sony Pictures Television. The ten-episode second season premiered on March 11, 2018, and ran until NBC canceled the series again in June 2018. One month later, NBC ordered a two-part finale to conclude the series, which aired on December 20, 2018.

== Premise ==
When Eastern European former National Security Agency asset-turned-terrorist Garcia Flynn and his group of terrorists steal an experimental time machine, Lucy Preston, a history professor, Wyatt Logan, a United States Army Delta Force Master Sergeant, and Rufus Carlin, an engineer and programmer, are tasked with capturing Flynn. They soon learn that Flynn plans to rewrite history and that each of them has a connection to his plan as well as the mysterious organization known as Rittenhouse that funded the machine's development.

== Cast and characters ==
=== Main ===
- Abigail Spencer as Lucy Preston, a history professor and leader of the "Lifeboat" team
- Matt Lanter as Master Sergeant Wyatt Logan, a United States Army Delta Force non-commissioned officer and soldier of the "Lifeboat" team
- Malcolm Barrett as Rufus Carlin, a programmer and pilot of the "Lifeboat" team
- Paterson Joseph as Connor Mason, head of Mason Industries, creator of the "Lifeboat" and "Mothership" time machines
- Sakina Jaffrey as Denise Christopher, the Department of Homeland Security agent in charge of the "Lifeboat" team
- Claudia Doumit as Jiya Marri, a talented young programmer at Mason Industries.
- Goran Višnjić as Garcia Flynn, an Eastern European former National Security Agency asset-turned-terrorist whom the team chases when he steals the "Mothership"; he later joins the "Lifeboat" team to stop Rittenhouse.

=== Recurring ===
- Matt Frewer as Anthony Bruhl (season 1), time travel project leader at Mason Industries
- Susanna Thompson as Carol Preston, Lucy's mother and a Rittenhouse member
- John Getz as Benjamin Cahill, Rittenhouse agent and Lucy's biological father
- Chad Rook as Karl (season 1), Flynn's henchman
- Annie Wersching as Emma Whitmore, former Mason Industries employee and Rittenhouse member
- Michael Rady as Nicholas Keynes (season 2), Rittenhouse leader from 1918
- Tonya Glanz as Jessica Logan (season 2), Wyatt's wife

== Episodes ==
Season	Episodes	Originally released	
Season	Episodes	First released	Last released
1	16	October 3, 2016	February 20, 2017
2	10	March 11, 2018	May 13, 2018
Finale	2	December 20, 2018	

=== Season 1 (2016–17) ===
No. overall	No. in season	Title	Directed by	Written by	Original release date	Prod. code	U.S. viewers (millions)
1	1	"Pilot"	Neil Marshall	Eric Kripke & Shawn Ryan	October 3, 2016	101	7.60
The team pursues Flynn to 1937, where he prevents the Hindenburg disaster in order to bomb the dirigible on its return flight to Europe, when it is carrying important Americans to the Coronation of King George VI and Queen Elizabeth. Lucy theorizes that Flynn wants to destroy the United States of America "in the crib". Lucy, Wyatt, and Rufus hijack the Hindenburg and force it to land; as a result, all of the passengers survive despite the airship being destroyed by a stray gunshot from one of Flynn's henchmen. During a confrontation with Lucy and Wyatt, Flynn shoots and kills reporter Kate Drummond, whom Lucy and Wyatt had befriended and who was supposed to die in the original crash. Flynn reveals to Lucy that he possesses a journal written in her handwriting which she has yet to create; he urges her to ask Agent Christopher about "Rittenhouse". In the present, Agent Christopher denies knowledge of Rittenhouse and Rufus reluctantly gives Connor an audio recording from the mission. Lucy discovers that her mother, who had been suffering from advanced cancer, is now healthy, but her younger sister Amy no longer exists and Lucy herself is engaged.
2	2	"The Assassination of Abraham Lincoln"	Neil Marshall	Tom Smuts	October 10, 2016	102	6.20
Flynn travels to April 14, 1865, the date of the assassination of Abraham Lincoln. He works with John Wilkes Booth, intending to ensure the success of the planned assassinations of Vice President Andrew Johnson, Secretary of State William H. Seward, and General Ulysses S. Grant. Lucy meets Robert Todd Lincoln and attends the fateful performance at Ford's Theatre as his guest; Flynn, frustrated with Booth's refusal to use a modern firearm, takes his place and murders Lincoln himself, but Lucy saves Grant while Rufus and Wyatt save Johnson and Seward, respectively. In the present, Lucy learns that her parents never met because her father married the granddaughter of a Hindenburg passenger, which means the man who raised her was never really her biological father. Rufus refuses to make further recordings for Connor, but Connor forces him to continue on the basis of having financed his education; it is revealed that both are aware of "Rittenhouse". Lucy arrives home, late for her own engagement party, where she confronts her mother over her father's identity, but is interrupted by a greeting from her fiancé, whom she does not know.
3	3	"Atomic City"	Charles Beeson	Lana Cho	October 17, 2016	103	5.86
Agent Christopher orders Wyatt to eliminate Rufus's coworker Anthony, whom Flynn abducted when he stole the time machine. In 1962 Las Vegas, when atomic tests are common near the city, Flynn uses intimate photographs to blackmail John F. Kennedy's mistress, Judith Campbell, into helping him steal a plutonium core, as her relationship with a general enables her to access a secure nuclear facility. Rufus discovers that Anthony is Flynn's willing collaborator; they are working to destroy Rittenhouse. Anthony seemingly relinquishes the core to Rufus, and Rufus prevents Wyatt from killing his former colleague. The team discovers the core is a decoy while Flynn successfully escapes with the real device. Wyatt arranges for a telegram to be delivered to his wife in fifty years, attempting to save her life in 2012. Upon their return to the present, Wyatt learns that his wife is still dead and he covers up Rufus' protection of Anthony; Lucy tells her fiancé, Noah, that she needs to move to her mother's to clear her head. In the Nevada desert, Flynn and Anthony dig up the plutonium core, which they had buried rather than risk transporting it through time.
4	4	"Party at Castle Varlar"	Billy Gierhart	Jim Barnes	October 24, 2016	104	5.47
Jiya locates Flynn by tracking his usage of the power grid to charge the Mothership, but Flynn's group escapes. In Germany of 1944, the team believes Flynn intends to give his nuclear weapon to the Nazis, but he is actually planning to abduct Wernher von Braun and deliver him to the Soviet Union. With help from Ian Fleming, the team secures von Braun's defection to the Allies. Wyatt helps Lucy find "something to fight for" to overcome her fears during field work, while Ian and Rufus discuss the matter of trust among spies. Rufus confronts von Braun, who claims that moral considerations impede innovation. In the present, the team discovers that their adventure inspired a James Bond film that is new to the timeline. Lucy demands that Agent Christopher and Connor help her recover Amy as a condition of her continued cooperation. Rufus correctly theorizes that Anthony has used the plutonium to create a permanent battery for the time machine rather than a weapon. Rufus refuses to continue spying on his teammates, but a man from Rittenhouse threatens Rufus's family if he does not cooperate.
5	5	"The Alamo"	John Terlesky	Anne Cofell Saunders	October 31, 2016	105	5.24
Flynn travels to March 2, 1836, and convinces Mexican President General Antonio López de Santa Anna to attack the Alamo three days before the actual attack occurred. Lucy, Wyatt, and Rufus follow suit and enter the Alamo Mission, but Flynn kills William B. Travis, preventing him from finishing his "Victory or Death" letter. Making matters worse is the Mexican Army waving the red flag to take no prisoners in their siege. Flynn is upset that the timeline is changing; in the original timeline, Santa Anna allowed the women and children to leave the Alamo before the final assault. Wyatt and Rufus dig an underground passageway to the aqueduct, while Lucy finishes Travis's letter and entrusts it to John William Smith, who escapes with the women and children while James Bowie and Davy Crockett fend off against the invading Mexicans. Wyatt is told he will be replaced, but Lucy and Rufus convince Christopher to keep him on. Lucy's letter, although substantially different from Travis's original, preserves the timeline by rallying support for the Texas Revolution. Lucy reconciles with her mother, who writes down the name of Lucy's father and gives it to her.
6	6	"The Watergate Tape"	Greg Beeman	Kent Rotherham	November 14, 2016	106	4.53
The team follows Flynn to the start of the Watergate scandal in 1972 to prevent him from finding the missing gap in the Watergate tapes, but Flynn captures them and reveals he already has the tape. He plays a recording of Richard Nixon talking about Rittenhouse and blackmails Lucy and Rufus to find a missing "doc" Nixon mentioned to save Wyatt's life. Rufus is threatened by a Rittenhouse agent in the present day to contact someone in 1972; his contact orders him to "destroy the doc". Flynn reveals to Wyatt that he learned Rittenhouse was bankrolling Mason Industries but, when he reported this to his superiors in the NSA, Rittenhouse murdered his wife and daughter. Using intelligence obtained from "Deep Throat", Lucy and Rufus are led to a Black Liberation Army safe house and discover that "Doc" is a former Rittenhouse member who knows the organization's entire roster. Lucy and Rufus manage to rescue Wyatt and help Doc escape. Lucy intends to visit her biological father, Benjamin Cahill (who is revealed to be the Rittenhouse agent threatening Rufus), but leaves without introducing herself, unaware of who Cahill really is.
7	7	"Stranded"	Holly Dale	Arika Lisanne Mittman	November 21, 2016	107	4.71
The team follows Flynn to 1754, the beginning of the French and Indian War. Flynn's henchmen sabotage the Lifeboat, stranding the trio. With no technological means to repair their time machine, Rufus buries a message in a bottle for Mason to dig up. The trio are captured by the Shawnee tribe and they meet chieftain Nonhelema. Nonhelema orders Lucy and Wyatt be executed, but chooses to spare Rufus's life. After Rufus convinces the chieftain to let his teammates go, the trio proceeds to Fort Duquesne, where Rufus collects items to repair the Lifeboat. Mason's team recovers the bottle, but the message is almost completely faded. Jiya deduces the message from the sparse wording recovered, helping the Lifeboat navigate back to present day after the group repairs it. Jiya reveals her true feelings for Rufus, while Agent Christopher requests that Mason be placed under surveillance. The trio repairs their strained relationship and Wyatt convinces Lucy to choose her own path, rather than letting it be determined by the journal Flynn possesses.
8	8	"Space Race"	Charles Beeson	Matt Whitney	November 28, 2016	108	4.78
Flynn and his team travel to July 20, 1969, to infiltrate the Manned Spacecraft Center in Houston and disrupt the Apollo 11 mission. Shortly after entering the timeline, Rufus confronts Anthony over his involvement in the 1754 stranding, but Anthony escapes when Mission Control loses communication with Apollo 11. Rufus discovers through a local computer that Anthony has inserted a DoS attack into the center's mainframe. As 1960s technology is unable to counter the virus, Rufus and Lucy get help from mathematician Katherine Johnson, who gets them into the mainframe. Just as they are deleting the virus, they are confronted by Anthony and one of Flynn's henchmen. Rufus kills the henchman before Anthony escapes while communication with Apollo 11 is restored by Rufus and Katherine's computer fix. Meanwhile, Flynn meets Lockman Aerospace secretary Maria Thompkins and her son Gabriel at a park before disappearing from Wyatt's sight. Wyatt explains to Maria that Flynn is a Russian spy, but Flynn sneaks into her home and injects Gabriel with a shot of epinephrine to counter an anaphylactic reaction before getting away from Wyatt. Back in the present, the team discovers through a secret file that Maria was Flynn's mother and Gabriel was his half-brother.
9	9	"Last Ride of Bonnie & Clyde"	John Terlesky	Anslem Richardson	December 5, 2016	109	5.08
The trio travels to 1934 in Arkansas as Flynn tries to find a necklace key related to Rittenhouse. Upon their arrival, they encounter Bonnie Parker and Clyde Barrow during a bank robbery and discover that Bonnie is wearing the key. Lucy and Wyatt help Bonnie and Clyde escape from a gunfight with the police and Flynn. Meanwhile, Rufus is arrested and interrogated by Texas Ranger Frank Hamer, but he is released. Hamer gets Barrow Gang member Henry Methvin to reveal Bonnie and Clyde's location. At their hideout, Bonnie reveals that Clyde gave her the key as an engagement gift after stealing it from Henry Ford. Methvin shows up at the hideout, as well as Rufus, but Methvin is killed by Clyde after Rufus reveals his betrayal. Meanwhile, Hamer's posse and Flynn close in and a shootout occurs. Flynn grabs the key and escapes before both Bonnie and Clyde are shot dead by Hamer. Back in the present day, Mason warns Cahill that Agent Christopher is coming close to discovering Rittenhouse, unaware that she has him on surveillance. Upon the trio's return, Rufus agrees to ally with Agent Christopher. Elsewhere, Flynn uses the key to open a clock, revealing a secret letter.
10	10	"The Capture of Benedict Arnold"	John F. Showalter	Tom Smuts	December 12, 2016	110	4.81
Agent Christopher entrusts a thumb drive containing details of her family to Lucy to carry in the Lifeboat in case history changes again. The Lifeboat team pursues Flynn to New York on September 25, 1780, the day Benedict Arnold planned to surrender West Point to the British Army. The trio is captured by George Washington's forces and confronted by Flynn, who reveals that the secret letter shows Arnold was a founding member of Rittenhouse. He offers them the Mothership and the identity of Wyatt's wife's killer in exchange for them helping Flynn capture Arnold. The trio and Flynn rush to the British border, acting as defectors and capturing Arnold, who reveals that Rittenhouse was founded by David Rittenhouse. The group gets Arnold to bring them to meet Rittenhouse, who quickly foils their plot to kill him. Rittenhouse murders Arnold, but Rufus saves Wyatt and Flynn from being executed as well. Flynn kills Rittenhouse, but Rittenhouse's son, John, escapes from the scene. Flynn finds John and prepares to kill him, only to be interrupted by Lucy. When John disappears, Flynn takes Lucy with him aboard the Mothership and they disappear before Wyatt and Rufus can save her.
11	11	"The World's Columbian Exposition"	Craig Zisk	Lana Cho	January 16, 2017	111	3.45
Wyatt and Rufus are desperate to rescue Lucy, who has been kidnapped by Flynn. Flynn takes Lucy to 1893 during the Chicago World's Fair with the intent to kill Thomas Edison, Henry Ford and J. P. Morgan. Wyatt and Rufus follow them, but get trapped with architect Sophia Hayden and a guest named George Henry in the World's Fair Hotel, run by serial killer H. H. Holmes. At the fair, Lucy and Flynn apprehend Harry Houdini and have him break into Edison's office to plant a bomb, but Houdini prevents Flynn from killing them. Houdini then helps Lucy save Wyatt and Rufus at the hotel. Lucy realizes that "George" is Holmes just as she is captured, but Wyatt saves her and kills Holmes. The trio bids farewell to Houdini and Sophia before returning to the present day. Rufus records a threat to Rittenhouse and hands it to Mason. Wyatt gets a phone call from Flynn, who reveals the identity of Jessica's killer and suggests that Wyatt try and erase the killer's existence.
12	12	"The Murder of Jesse James"	John F. Showalter	Jim Barnes	January 23, 2017	112	3.46
Wyatt visits Wes Gilliam at San Quentin to know if he really is Jessica's killer, while Lucy has a nightmare about Amy and Rufus finds out that Jiya will replace him as the Lifeboat's pilot in six months. The team travels to April 3, 1882, where Flynn saves famous outlaw Jesse James from being murdered by Charley and Robert Ford in order to get his cooperation in finding a person deep within Indian territory. To track Flynn and James, the trio enlists the help of U.S. Marshals Bass Reeves and Grant Johnson, but Rufus discovers that Wyatt plans to kill James himself. Flynn and James arrive at the home of Emma Whitmore, a former time machine pilot who avoided Rittenhouse by stranding herself in the 19th century. After Flynn and Emma leave the premises, James uses Flynn's assault rifle to ambush the Lifeboat team and Reeves, killing Johnson. Wyatt wounds James but, as Reeves tries to defuse the situation, Lucy shoots an unarmed James in the back as he tries to surrender, killing him. Back in the present timeline, Rufus informs Mason and Agent Christopher that Emma is alive. Mason confronts Jiya over hacking secret video logs about Emma. At a bar, Wyatt asks Rufus to help him steal the Lifeboat to save Jessica.
13	13	"Karma Chameleon"	Greg Beeman	Anne Cofell Saunders	January 30, 2017	113	3.51
Wyatt and Rufus steal the Lifeboat and travel to Toledo, Ohio, in 1983 to circumvent the one-night stand between the parents of Jessica's killer, a bartender and a stewardess. After several unsuccessful attempts, Wyatt chases the bartender outside in the midst of a tornado. The bartender trips over debris, resulting in a fatal fall. Meanwhile, Emma tells Flynn and Anthony about Rittenhouse's real intentions for the time machines. Flynn wants to continue eradicating Rittenhouse, but Anthony thinks they should destroy both machines. Anthony confides in Lucy about his plans for sabotage. Lucy tells this information to Agent Christopher and they agree to keep it to themselves just before Lucy learns of Mason's dealings with her biological father, Benjamin Cahill. When Wyatt and Rufus return to the present, they discover Jessica was still killed but the other two women were saved, as Wyatt is taken into custody. There is an explosion at the Mothership's location, but there is a lack of debris from the machine and Anthony's body is discovered in the rubble with close-range gunshot wounds. Agent Christopher and Rufus realize that Flynn discovered Anthony's betrayal and escaped in the Mothership. Lucy confronts Cahill about Rittenhouse.
14	14	"The Lost Generation"	Craig Zisk	Kent Rotherham & David Hoffman	February 6, 2017	114	2.92
With Wyatt arrested for stealing the Lifeboat, Lucy and Rufus travel with Master Sergeant Dave Baumgardner to Paris on May 21, 1927, the day Charles Lindbergh made the first solo transatlantic flight. There, Flynn shoots down the Spirit of St. Louis and takes Lindbergh hostage. The Lifeboat team meets journalist Ernest Hemingway, who helps them search for Flynn and Lindbergh. The trio chase after Emma and Karl outside a night club headlined by Josephine Baker, but Dave is killed in the ensuing gunfight. With Dave gone, a drunk Hemingway offers to be the team's muscle, much to Lucy's chagrin. Lucy is captured by Flynn, who plans to kill Lindbergh unless she convinces him to leave Rittenhouse. Rufus and Hemingway enter the city's catacombs and rescue Lucy and Lindbergh, who decides to go in hiding. Meanwhile, NSA Agent Jake Neville takes over the time machine project from Agent Christopher. Wyatt escapes after being secretly handed a paper clip by Agent Christopher. Lucy and Rufus are shocked to meet Neville upon their return. Lucy discovers in a history book that Lindbergh went underground for a few weeks before resuming his life of fame and fortune. At a warehouse in Oakland, Lucy, Wyatt, Rufus, and Agent Christopher meet to discuss their next plan of action.
15	15	"Public Enemy No. 1"	Guy Ferland	Matt Whitney & Anslem Richardson	February 13, 2017	115	2.99
Agent Neville orders Rufus, Lucy, and a soldier to travel to 1962 Houston to erase Flynn from existence by killing his mother, but Rufus and Lucy steal the time machine and reunite with Wyatt. Although they had planned to save Lucy's sister, they jump to 1931 Chicago to pursue Flynn. There, Flynn helps Al Capone avoid jail in exchange for a meeting with Chicago mayor and Rittenhouse member William Hale Thompson. The team joins forces with Eliot Ness to bring the mobster to justice, but Ness is gunned down by one of Capone's hitmen. With Ness eliminated, the trio seeks help from Capone's elder brother who is living as a Prohibition agent under the name of Richard Hart. They gain access to Capone and the mobster reveals that Flynn has learned about a Rittenhouse meeting in 1954 before Hart announces that he is bringing him in. Capone shoots Rufus as a favor to Flynn before he is killed by Hart. Jiya is questioned by Mason and Agent Neville as to the team's whereabouts. Mason asks Cahill for access to NSA data to track not only the Lifeboat but virtually anyone globally. Just as the Lifeboat is about to jump, Rufus loses consciousness from his gunshot wound.
16	16	"The Red Scare"	Matt Earl Beesley	Arika Lisanne Mittman	February 20, 2017	116	3.37
The Lifeboat returns to the present, where Lucy has Noah treat Rufus before she breaks up with him. The team and Jiya jump to Washington, D.C., in 1954, where Flynn blackmails Joseph McCarthy into giving him the address of the Rittenhouse summit. After being arrested on suspicion of being Soviet spies, Lucy and Wyatt escape and coerce Ethan Cahill, Lucy's grandfather, into taking them to the summit. Upon their arrival, Lucy convinces Flynn of another way to stop Rittenhouse. When Jiya suffers a seizure, Wyatt and Rufus accompany her back to the present while Lucy stays with Flynn and Ethan. Meanwhile, Mason reveals Cahill's activities to Agent Christopher and expresses remorse for endangering Rufus. Back in the present, Lucy, accompanied by Wyatt, visits an elderly Ethan, who gives them decades' worth of records on Rittenhouse activities. Mason and the team begin using the documents to systematically arrest members of the organization. Lucy gives Flynn the name of the person who ordered the assassination of his family, but he is immediately arrested by Agent Christopher, who agrees to fulfill her promise to help Lucy restore her sister Amy to the timeline. Lucy feels guilty about this because, in the original timeline, Carol is dying from cancer. She admits everything to her mother about time travel and Amy, but her mother then reveals, to Lucy's horror, that she, too, is a Rittenhouse member. Meanwhile, Emma, also shown to be a Rittenhouse member, is seen stealing the Mothership.

=== Season 2 (2018) ===
No. overall	No. in season	Title	Directed by	Written by	Original release date	Prod. code	U.S. viewers (millions)
17	1	"The War to End All Wars"	Greg Beeman	Arika Lisanne Mittman & Tom Smuts	March 11, 2018	201	2.97
As Rufus and Wyatt prepare to get Amy back, Mason Industries is bombed. They survive and Agent Christopher relocates them to a decommissioned nuclear bunker. Six weeks later, Lucy — now seemingly integrated into Rittenhouse — joins Carol and Emma in traveling to the Battle of Saint-Mihiel in France on September 14, 1918, to save injured soldier Nicholas Keynes. In the repaired Lifeboat, Wyatt and Rufus follow the Mothership and discover Lucy sabotaging Carol's mission. Wyatt and Rufus get a copy of Keynes' 1910 Rittenhouse time travel manifesto from a modern Rittenhouse agent fully integrated into the past. Marie Curie and Irène Joliot-Curie, using a "petite Curie" radiography unit, help save Keynes, but Emma threatens to kill them when they discover the Mothership. Wyatt and Rufus take Keynes hostage, allowing the Curies to flee while Keynes is exchanged for Lucy. Mason, who feels as though he has nothing to contribute, develops an algorithm to track the Mothership's movements as Jiya continues to have seizures. Wyatt surmises that Rittenhouse has placed sleeper agents throughout history. Carol brings Keynes to 2018 and reveals that she is his granddaughter. Agent Christopher approaches an incarcerated Flynn about the manifesto, but he will only speak to Lucy.
18	2	"The Darlington 500"	Olatunde Osunsanmi	Jim Barnes	March 18, 2018	202	2.85
The Lifeboat team follows the Mothership to September 4, 1955, in Darlington, South Carolina, after Flynn gives Lucy a tip about a Rittenhouse-affiliated address. They discover that Rittenhouse is after NASCAR race driver Ryan Millerson, who is scheduled to race at the Darlington 500. At the track, they realize that Millerson is the sleeper agent right before race car driver Wendell Scott saves them from being killed by Emma. The trio deduces that a bomb in Millerson's car is intended to murder automotive executives in attendance so Rittenhouse can take over the auto industry. They have Wendell sneak them into the track to stop Rittenhouse's mission. Wyatt kills Millerson, but not before the bomb is armed. Wyatt drives the car back to Wendell's garage, where Rufus defuses the bomb. In the present, as Mason is preparing for a public appearance against Agent Christopher's orders, she arrests him and sends him back to the bunker. Keynes reveals to his followers his vision to perfect humanity by cutting away its flaws.
19	3	"Hollywoodland"	John Showalter	Matt Whitney	March 25, 2018	203	2.56
The Lifeboat team travels to January 2, 1941, Los Angeles, where Rittenhouse sleeper agent Lucas Calhoun, an RKO Pictures producer, steals the only existing copy of Citizen Kane and offers it to William Randolph Hearst in exchange for a weekly column in all Hearst Communications papers, allowing Rittenhouse to manipulate history using propaganda. With the help of actress and inventor Hedy Lamarr, the trio kills Lucas and recovers the film. Rufus and Lamarr discuss intellectual property rights, leading to Lamarr becoming a tech billionaire in later years. Working in the past and present, the trio and Agent Christopher orchestrate Flynn's escape from prison so that he can help the Lifeboat team with their missions. He joins them in the bunker. A medical exam finds Jiya in peak health; Mason tells Agent Christopher that previous afflicted pilots suffered schizophrenia or death. Shortly after Wyatt and Lucy's working relationship becomes romantic, he discovers that his presumed-dead wife Jessica is alive.
20	4	"The Salem Witch Hunt"	Guy Ferland	Kent Rotherham	April 8, 2018	204	2.47
Seeing Lucy as an ideological threat, Nicholas orders Carol to kill her. Jiya tells Rufus of her premonition that he will kill 17th-century judge Samuel Sewall. Wyatt tells Lucy that Jessica is alive. Rufus attributes it to recent Rittenhouse activity in 1980. Lucy, Rufus, and Flynn take the Lifeboat to September 22, 1692, in Salem, Massachusetts, where they discover that Abiah Franklin, the future mother of Benjamin Franklin, is slated for execution in the Salem witch trials. Lucy and Rufus are arrested after Carol accuses Lucy of witchcraft. Carol slips Lucy a dagger to aid her escape, despite Lucy's rejection. Flynn shoots at the crowd, enabling all of the convicted to escape. Amid the chaos, Rufus defuses an armed confrontation with Sewall, but Sewall is killed by a runaway carriage. In the present, Jessica considers divorcing Wyatt as their relationship is strained, but he brings her to the bunker to show her the Lifeboat and reveal her original past. He asks for another chance with her. Distraught by the predestination paradox they experienced, Rufus asks Jiya to not describe her premonitions. Because Carol failed to kill Lucy, Nicholas tasks Emma with the job.
21	5	"The Kennedy Curse"	Holly Dale	Lana Cho	April 15, 2018	205	2.47
Flynn stops a Rittenhouse sleeper agent from killing 17-year-old John F. Kennedy in 1934. To escape other agents, Wyatt and Rufus bring Kennedy to 2018. Kennedy flees before the Lifeboat is recharged. He hitches a ride with some college students, but is soon hospitalized with stomach pains. Carol captures Agent Christopher and, before releasing her, demands she protect Lucy by keeping her away from Rittenhouse's missions. Christopher gives Lucy this option, but Lucy refuses. Emma is tasked to kill Kennedy and Wyatt fights her off at the hospital. Jessica intends to break up with Wyatt after realizing he and Lucy had a relationship, but recommits herself to Wyatt after Lucy describes his many efforts to save her. At a house party, Kennedy learns of his and his family's future, including the "Kennedy curse." The team saves Kennedy and Emma escapes. Rufus advises Kennedy to avoid his assassination in Dallas. When the Lifeboat returns with Flynn after returning Kennedy to 1934, Kennedy was still assassinated, but in Austin. After overhearing Lucy and Wyatt make peace with the end of their relationship, Flynn offers Lucy a beer.
22	6	"The King of the Delta Blues"	Greg Beeman	Anslem Richardson	April 22, 2018	206	2.31
Rufus and Jiya add a fourth Lifeboat seat. Mason loses his company. Lucy, Rufus, Flynn, and Mason follow the Mothership to San Antonio, Texas on November 23, 1936 to save Mason's idol, blues musician Robert Johnson, thereby preserving rock and roll and the 1960s counterculture revolution. The team saves Johnson from a Rittenhouse sleeper agent, but Johnson flees, believing himself cursed. Lucy convinces Johnson's producer, Don Law, not to abandon the album, but his associate Betty, another sleeper agent, kills him. Lucy and Flynn commiserate over their lost loved ones. Rufus and Mason find Johnson and drive him to his sister's juke joint, where Mason kills Betty. Mason, inspired by Rufus's admiration for him, convinces Johnson to record the album with Mason as sound engineer. In the present, Agent Christopher sends Wyatt to raid Rittenhouse's headquarters. Wyatt fails to shoot Carol, who escapes in the Mothership with Nicholas and Emma. Lucy brings a vodka bottle to Flynn's room at night. When Jiya is troubled by a premonition, Rufus agrees to hear it. She believes he will die in a confrontation with cowboys.
23	7	"Mrs. Sherlock Holmes"	Douglas Aarniokoski	David C. Hoffman	April 29, 2018	207	2.52
Lucy, Wyatt, Rufus, and Flynn follow the Mothership to New York City on March 4, 1919, where Rittenhouse frames suffragist Alice Paul for murder on the day she persuaded Woodrow Wilson to support the Nineteenth Amendment. Lucy and Wyatt enlist attorney and sleuth Grace Humiston, who disapproves of advocacy, to prove Paul's innocence, but Paul is murdered in her cell. Emma violates Nicholas' orders and instead helps Rufus and Flynn stop the sleeper agent, who is masquerading as a suffragist. Emma wants to protect the rights of women like her mother, who saved them both from Emma's abusive father. Humiston detects and neutralizes the sleeper, whom Emma kills. Rufus, believing himself invincible in the absence of cowboys, is uncharacteristically reckless and is injured. Humiston persuades Wilson by speaking from the heart about equal justice for women. In the present, Mason and Jiya salvage Rittenhouse data. Mason and Agent Christopher discover a photo of Jessica in the data. Rufus and Jiya argue over her premonition, then agree to face events together. Lucy tells Wyatt she and Flynn only talked. They agree to focus on saving the world. Nicholas advances an ideological and romantic partnership with Emma.
24	8	"The Day Reagan Was Shot"	Alex Kalymnios	Arika Lisanne Mittman & Lauren Greer	May 6, 2018	208	2.23
Lucy, Wyatt, Rufus, and Jiya travel to Washington, D.C., on March 30, 1981, the day Ronald Reagan was shot. The team discovers that Rittenhouse is after a young Denise Christopher, then a rookie cop. Denise is injured and her mother urges her to give up police work and accept an arranged marriage. To change Denise's mind, Lucy and Jiya help Denise capture a fugitive John Hinckley Jr., then reveal themselves as time travelers, showing her photos of her family. Denise ends the engagement by coming out to her mother, which she had never done originally. Wyatt and Rufus capture the sleeper, Owen, and kill Owen's brother Zac before he can kill Denise. Owen kills himself, fearing Rittenhouse's retribution. After realizing she is the target, Flynn convinces Agent Christopher to spend time with her family. Denise thanks the team for saving her when they return. Jiya and Rufus pledge to save Rufus' life. Flynn tells Lucy that she came from the future to give him her journal after his family was murdered. Wyatt discovers Jessica's brother is alive, though Wyatt remembers him dying as a child. After Wyatt finds out an unknown medical treatment saved his life, Jessica tells Wyatt she is pregnant.
25	9	"The General"	John F. Showalter	Matt Whitney	May 13, 2018	209	2.43
Lucy, Wyatt, Rufus, and Flynn follow the Mothership to South Carolina on June 1, 1863, where Rittenhouse sleeper agent Confederate Colonel Ryerson uses a history book provided by Emma to outmaneuver Union troops and drive away Colonel James Montgomery and his forces. Wyatt and Rufus work with Harriet Tubman to orchestrate a plantation raid similar to the original Combahee River Raid, while Lucy and Flynn convince Montgomery to reinforce Tubman. Tubman trusts Rufus because she experienced a divine vision of his assistance that, unbeknownst to her, also depicted the Lifeboat. In the present, Carol focuses Nicholas on the idea of Rittenhouse as a family legacy. Jiya meets institutionalized time-machine pilot Stanley Fisher, who tells her that she can deliberately access visions of other time periods. Wyatt conceals the information about Jessica's brother Kevin, even after Agent Christopher informs him that Rittenhouse has surveilled Jessica all her life. Jessica takes Jiya hostage with Wyatt's gun and absconds with her and the Lifeboat.
26	10	"Chinatown"	Greg Beeman	Tom Smuts & Nancy Baird	May 13, 2018	210	2.43
Jiya kills her Rittenhouse guard and flees in the Lifeboat. Sedated, and with the vessel damaged by Emma's gunfire, Jiya fails to land the Lifeboat in the bunker. Lucy discovers a photograph of Jiya in Chinatown, San Francisco, dated 1888. Jiya's message in Klingon provides the Lifeboat's location and an exhortation not to come for her. Lucy, Wyatt, Rufus, and Flynn nevertheless travel to 1888. When Carol prevents Emma from killing Lucy, Emma kills Carol and Nicholas, taking on Jessica as her new partner. A dying Carol tells Lucy she regrets taking Amy from her and not raising Lucy to believe in Rittenhouse. Jessica tells Wyatt that she was raised by Rittenhouse and really is carrying his child. Jiya has lived and worked in a bar since 1885 and has identified it as the location of Rufus' death. She has mastered her visions and saves Rufus from Emma's henchman, but Emma shoots and kills him. Jessica and Emma escape. In the present, Jiya and Wyatt blame themselves for Rufus' death. Wyatt tells Lucy he loves her. An upgraded Lifeboat arrives. Battle-hardened future versions of Wyatt and Lucy emerge, inviting the team to save Rufus.

=== Finale (2018) ===
No. overall	No. in season	Title	Directed by	Written by	Original release date	Prod. code	U.S. viewers (millions)
27	1	"The Miracle of Christmas"	John Showalter	Lauren Greer	December 20, 2018	301	3.23
28	2	"The Miracle of Christmas"	John Showalter	Arika Lisanne Mittman	December 20, 2018	302	3.23
The future Lucy and Wyatt explain that they are from 2023 and that the only chance of stopping Rittenhouse lies with saving Rufus. The future Lucy gives her past self her journal as a guide, while the future Wyatt reveals Jessica's manipulations. The future Lucy and Wyatt depart in the team's Lifeboat, leaving their own more advanced version for the team's use. Emma sends Jessica to activate their last sleeper agent during the Gold Rush of 1848. After following Jessica to 1848, Wyatt realizes that, to save Rufus, Jessica has to die, undoing all of her actions. At night, Flynn slips off and travels back to 2012, where he kills Jessica on the night she originally died. Flynn sends the Lifeboat back to 1848 and watches his family from a distance one last time before dying from the side effects of time traveling within his own timeline. With Jessica gone, Rufus returns and rescues the team from the sleeper, having no memory of ever being dead. Shortly after returning to 2018, the reunited team is forced to travel to the Hungnam evacuation of Christmas 1950, where they barely escape a trap set by Emma, using a helicopter pilot she bribed. After their departure, Mason and Denise discover that the team dies there when the Chinese army massacres a nearby village. As the team attempts to save a pregnant woman while returning to the Lifeboat, Denise goes to Benjamin Cahill in order to find out where Emma is hiding. Once informed about his daughter's fate, Benjamin, who still loves Lucy, leads Denise and her team to the remaining safehouse, where Emma is arrested. Denise arrives with Emma and the Mothership to rescue the team. Emma tries to make a deal with Lucy for her freedom in exchange for saving Amy, but Lucy refuses and Emma is killed by Chinese soldiers as everyone escapes. With Rittenhouse defeated, Lucy abandons her search for Amy and resumes her relationship with Wyatt, while Jiya and Rufus resume their own relationship. The Mothership is destroyed, but Denise chooses to spare the Lifeboat in case someone ever reinvents time travel. In 2023, Lucy is a tenured history professor and Wyatt works for Denise with Homeland Security. They are happily married with twin daughters Flynn and Amy. Rufus and Jiya run their own company together. In order to keep history on track and ensure the formation of their team, the team makes one final trip to 2014 to start Flynn's mission against Rittenhouse. At night, a young girl works on plans for a time machine, suggesting that their adventures are not over yet.

== Production ==
=== Development ===
Long considered one of NBC's hot pilots, it was ordered to series on May 13, 2016, after lengthy negotiations to obtain the series' "in-season stacking rights", which allow a network to stream all episodes of a series' current season via all the network's online platforms. On November 1, 2016, NBC ordered three additional episodes, increasing the first season order to 16. The season concluded on February 20, 2017.

=== Cancellation and reprieve ===
On May 10, 2017, NBC cancelled the series after one season. Three days later, following negotiations with Sony Pictures Television, NBC renewed the series for a ten-episode second season, which premiered on March 11, 2018. On June 22, 2018, NBC announced that the series had once again been cancelled, although the production of a possible two-hour movie finale to properly conclude the series was being discussed. On July 31, 2018, NBC announced it had ordered a two-part finale to properly conclude the series, which aired on December 20, 2018.

== Lawsuit over concept ==
Ryan, Kripke, Sony Pictures Entertainment and NBCUniversal were sued by Onza Entertainment for breach of contract and copyright infringement, claiming that the concept for Timeless was based on the Spanish series El ministerio del tiempo (The Ministry of Time), which follows the adventures of a three-person team made up of two men and a woman who travel to the past with a view to preserving past events.

In April 2015, Javier Olivares, one of the creators of El Ministerio del Tiempo, met with representatives of Gersh in the MIPTV audiovisual fair of Cannes. There, they discussed the possibility of developing an American version of the show. Gersh would later ask for a DVD copy of the first episode of the Spanish show, with English subtitles. Onza Partners, the Spanish production company, gave that DVD to the Gersh Agency in the hopes of working with them. Roy Ashton, from the Gersh Agency, wrote to Onza letting them know that they liked El Ministerio del Tiempo and wanted to work with them. Ashton also mentioned Eric Kripke and Ben Edlund as possible show runners.

In August 2015, Deadline reported that NBC had bought a project called Time, created by Kripke and Shawn Ryan. At the same time, all negotiations regarding the American version of El Ministerio del Tiempo were dropped. That project went on to become Timeless, with its pilot episode airing in January 2016.

The defendants responded to the suit in a November 23, 2016 filing, contending that shows about time travel are an established television genre, and that similarities between the two shows are generic, and largely based on the notion that the main characters will travel in time to effect some kind of change. A request to dismiss Onza's lawsuit by Sony was denied on February 15, 2017, and the two parties ultimately came to an agreement and jointly moved to dismiss.

== Release ==
Season 1 aired on NBC in the U.S. and on Global in Canada on Monday nights at 10 p.m. Eastern and Pacific (9 p.m. Central). Season 2 aired on NBC and Global on Sunday nights at 10 pm. EST/PST. (9 p.m. CST). Episodes can also be streamed online through NBC and Global's respective websites, as well as on Netflix in some countries. Episodes can also be streamed on Hulu in the United States. Starting from December 14, 2016, it aired in the UK on E4 every Wednesday at 9:00 pm. UK time. The series also aired in Japan on AXN.

== Reception ==
=== Critical response ===
The first season of Timeless received generally positive reviews from television critics. Review aggregation website Rotten Tomatoes gives the first season an approval rating of 83%, with an average rating of 6.39 out of 10 based on reviews by forty critics. The site's critical consensus states, "Timeless is a fun throwback action series with a kooky premise worth watching, even if it is delivered clumsily at times." The second season fared significantly better, receiving a 100% rating, with an average rating of 8.43 based on fourteen reviews. Metacritic, which uses a normalized rating, gave the first season a score of 65 out of 100, based on reviews from 29 critics, indicating "generally favorable reviews". A 90% approval rating for the finale was reported by Rotten Tomatoes, with an average rating of 8.83/10 based on 10 reviews, and a critical consensus reading, "A fitting farewell, Timeless wraps with a fun, festive finale that ties up loose ends and provides enough fan service to satisfy."

=== Ratings ===
==== Overall ====
Viewership and ratings per season of Timeless
Season	Timeslot (ET)	Episodes	First aired		Last aired		TV season	Viewership rank	Avg. viewers (millions)
Season	Timeslot (ET)	Episodes	Date	Viewers (millions)	Date	Viewers (millions)	TV season	Viewership rank	Avg. viewers (millions)
1	Monday 10:00 p.m.	16	October 3, 2016	7.60	February 20, 2017	3.37	2016–17	TBD	TBD
2	Sunday 10:00 p.m. (1–8, 10); Sunday 9:00 p.m. (9)	10	March 11, 2018	2.97	May 13, 2018	2.41	2017–18	TBD	TBD

==== Season 1 ====
Viewership and ratings per episode of Timeless
No.	Title	Air date	Rating/share (18–49)	Viewers (millions)	DVR (18–49)	DVR viewers (millions)	Total (18–49)	Total viewers (millions)
1	"Pilot"	October 3, 2016	1.8/7	7.60	1.2	4.43	3.0	12.03
2	"The Assassination of Abraham Lincoln"	October 10, 2016	1.4/5	6.20	1.1	4.07	2.5	10.27
3	"Atomic City"	October 17, 2016	1.5/5	5.86	1.1	3.84	2.6	9.70
4	"Party at Castle Varlar"	October 24, 2016	1.3/5	5.47	1.1	3.64	2.4	9.11
5	"The Alamo"	October 31, 2016	1.1/4	5.24	1.1	3.58	2.2	8.81
6	"The Watergate Tape"	November 14, 2016	1.2/4	4.53	1.0	4.53	2.2	8.11
7	"Stranded"	November 21, 2016	1.2/4	4.71	0.9	3.23	2.1	7.94
8	"Space Race"	November 28, 2016	1.1/4	4.78	0.9	3.40	2.0	8.18
9	"Last Ride of Bonnie & Clyde"	December 5, 2016	1.2/4	5.08	0.8	2.89	2.0	7.97
10	"The Capture of Benedict Arnold"	December 12, 2016	1.0/4	4.81	0.9	3.11	1.9	7.92
11	"The World's Columbian Exposition"	January 16, 2017	0.9/3	3.45	1.0	3.24	1.9	6.69
12	"The Murder of Jesse James"	January 23, 2017	0.9/3	3.46	0.9	3.22	1.8	6.68
13	"Karma Chameleon"	January 30, 2017	0.9/3	3.51	0.8	2.87	1.7	6.38
14	"The Lost Generation"	February 6, 2017	0.6/2	2.92	1.0	3.13	1.6	6.06
15	"Public Enemy No. 1"	February 13, 2017	0.7/3	2.99	0.8	2.94	1.5	5.93
16	"The Red Scare"	February 20, 2017	0.9/3	3.37	0.8	2.75	1.7	6.12

==== Season 2 ====
Viewership and ratings per episode of Timeless
No.	Title	Air date	Rating/share (18–49)	Viewers (millions)	DVR (18–49)	DVR viewers (millions)	Total (18–49)	Total viewers (millions)
1	"The War to End All Wars"	March 11, 2018	0.8/3	2.97	0.6	2.40	1.4	5.41
2	"The Darlington 500"	March 18, 2018	0.7/3	2.85	0.6	2.46	1.3	5.31
3	"Hollywoodland"	March 25, 2018	0.6/2	2.56	0.6	2.13	1.2	4.70
4	"The Salem Witch Hunt"	April 8, 2018	0.6/2	2.47	0.6	2.22	1.2	4.69
5	"The Kennedy Curse"	April 15, 2018	0.5/2	2.47	0.6	2.07	1.1	4.55
6	"The King of the Delta Blues"	April 22, 2018	0.5/2	2.31	0.6	2.08	1.1	4.39
7	"Mrs. Sherlock Holmes"	April 29, 2018	0.6/3	2.52	0.5	2.07	1.1	4.59
8	"The Day Reagan Was Shot"	May 6, 2018	0.5/2	2.23	—N/a	—N/a	—N/a	—N/a
9	"The General"	May 13, 2018	0.6/3	2.41	0.5	1.74	1.1	4.17
10	"Chinatown"	May 13, 2018	0.6/3	2.41	0.5	1.74	1.1	4.17

==== Finale ====
Viewership and ratings per episode of Timeless
No.	Title	Air date	Rating/share (18–49)	Viewers (millions)	DVR (18–49)	DVR viewers (millions)	Total (18–49)	Total viewers (millions)
1–2	"The Miracle of Christmas"	December 20, 2018	0.6/2	3.23	0.4	1.66	1.0	4.90

=== Accolades ===
Accolades received by Timeless
Award	Year	Category	Recipient(s)	Result	Ref.
American Society of Cinematographers	2019	Episode of a Series for Commercial Television	Nathaniel Goodman (for "The King of the Delta Blues")	Nominated	
People's Choice Awards	2017	Favorite New TV Drama	Timeless	Nominated	
Saturn Awards	2017	Best Science Fiction Television Series	Timeless	Nominated	
Teen Choice Awards	2017	Choice Breakout TV Show	Timeless	Nominated	
Teen Choice Awards	2017	Choice Hissy Fit	Malcolm Barrett	Nominated	
Teen Choice Awards	2017	Choice Sci-Fi/Fantasy TV Actress	Abigail Spencer	Nominated	
Teen Choice Awards	2017	Choice Sci-Fi/Fantasy TV Show	Timeless	Nominated	

== Home media ==
DVD name	Ep #	Release date
Timeless – Season 1	16	September 19, 2017
Timeless – Season 2	10	September 4, 2018
Timeless – Finale	2	June 11, 2019
