= Like So Many Things =

2009 American web series

- Created by: Anslem Richardson; Marin Gazzaniga
- Starring: Marin Gazzaniga; Greg Keller
- Country of origin: United States
- No. of episodes: 7

Production
- Running time: Approx. 5 minutes

Original release
- Network: IFC
- Release: May 26, 2009

Like So Many Things is an American web series, which airs on IFC and on IFC.com in the United States.

The dramatic web series is about an unlikely connection between two strangers in Brooklyn. After an awkward first meeting, Lucy and Karl run into each other again and begin an unlikely love affair.

The series is filmed and produced in Brooklyn by Marin Gazzaniga and Anslem Richardson.

== Cast/Crew ==
=== Major characters ===
Name	Actor	Role
Karl	Greg Keller	The childlike stranger who insists on getting to know Lucy.
Lucy	Marin Gazzaniga	The lonely, mysterious woman Karl becomes attracted to.
Joe	Anslem Richardson	Lucy's ex, who left a goodbye note to Lucy and appears to her in a sort of day-dream as she is having sex with Karl.

=== Crew ===
Name	Position
Marin Gazzanigal	Producer, writer, director, Co-Founder, and Lead Actress.
Anslem Richardson	Producer, Co-Founder, Writer, Director, and Supporting Actor.
Jon Hokanson	Director and director of Photography.
Greg Keller	Writer and Lead Actor.
Ben Insler	Director, Camera & Sound, Director of Photography, and editor.
Garret Savage	Editor and writer.
Ken Mayer	Sound & Dialogue Editor
Larry Gallagher	Composer

== Episodes ==
=== Season 1 (2009) ===
No.	Title	Original release date	Prod. code
1	"LIKE SO MANY THINGS... UNSAID"	May 26, 2009	101
Lucy and Karl meet and talk outside of a bar. Karl insists on getting to know Lucy better. Lucy is reluctant, but changes her mind and lets Karl walk her home.
2	"FUTURE DAYS, FUTURE NIGHT"	N/A	102
Three months after they first met, Karl and Lucy run into each other. Karl pushes their connection, and then tells her about a death he witnessed near where they were standing.
3	"Mister"	N/A	103
Karl walks Lucy home, starts revealing things about himself, his past relationships, and how he wants her to see him. Lucy is seemingly in another world as Karl pours his heart out.
4	"Episode 4: Hot Coffee"	N/A	104
Lucy and Karl arrive to her home. Lucy invites Karl in, and while she is upstairs washing her feet, Karl puts on some music and looks around, discovering little things about her.
5	"11 Things To Do At Home With A Stranger"	N/A	105
The two play word games and talk about their favorite things, they drink, and play thumb war.
6	"Where Is My Mind?"	N/A	106
The two become intimate, and Karl is bad in bed. Lucy lets her mind wander and has a daydream about Joe. She laughs out loud, embarrassing Karl who decides to leave.
7	"Eggs and Bacon"	N/A	107
Lucy asks Karl to stay. He goes to the kitchen and starts cooking them breakfast as the sun rises.
