= W. D. Jones =

Member of the Bonnie and Clyde Barrow Gang

William Jones
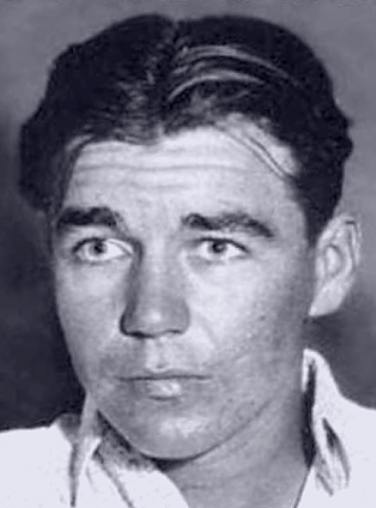
- Jones in 1933
- Born: William Daniel Jones; May 12, 1916; Henderson County, Texas, U.S.
- Died: August 20, 1974 (aged 58); Houston, Texas, U.S.
- Cause of death: Gunshot wound
- Other names: Jack Sherman, Hubert Bleigh, W.D., Dub, Deacon
- Status: Deceased
- Conviction: Murder without malice
- Penalty: 15 years imprisonment

William Daniel ("W.D.", "Bud", "Deacon") Jones (May 12, 1916 – August 20, 1974) was a member of the Barrow Gang, whose spree throughout the southern Midwest in the early years of the Great Depression became part of American criminal folklore. Jones ran with Clyde Barrow and Bonnie Parker for eight and a half months, from Christmas Eve 1932 to early September 1933. A sketch of his role in the gang, blended with one of a later gang member, Henry Methvin, was consolidated into the "C.W. Moss" character in the film Bonnie and Clyde (1967). Of the character in the movie, Jones said: "Moss was a dumb kid who run errands and done what Clyde told him. That was me, all right."

In 1974, Jones was fatally shot during an altercation in Houston, Texas. He was 58 years old.

== Early life ==
James Zeberdie Jones (1883–1923) and Tookie (née Garrison) Jones (1884–1971) were sharecroppers in Henderson County, Texas with six children: five sons and a daughter. W.D. was their second youngest child. After postwar cotton prices collapsed they gave up trying to farm, and circa 1921–22 the Joneses settled in the industrial slum of West Dallas, in the same wave that brought the Barrow family and hundreds of other poor families from the country to the unwelcoming city. West Dallas was a maze of tent cities and shacks without running water, gas or electricity, set on dirt streets amid smokestacks, oil refineries, "plants, quarries, lagoons, tank farms and burrow pits" on the Trinity River floodplain. It was while his family was living in the squatters' camp under the Oak Cliff Viaduct that W.D., then about five, first met Clyde Barrow, then age 11 or 12.

When W.D. was six years old his entire family was stricken by what was probably Spanish flu, which lingered after the 1918 pandemic in pockets of the United States where unhealthy conditions prevailed. His father and sister died in the same hour, his oldest brother two nights later, all of pneumonia, which was frequently the coup de grâce delivered by that strain of flu. Tookie Jones and four of her sons survived.

Jones grew up illiterate. Before or after the illness that devastated his family, he got partly through the first grade. He recalled that he left school to sell newspapers. He had been friends with LC Barrow, the youngest son of his mother's friend Cumie, since their families' first days in West Dallas. The Joneses and the Barrows were close: when Marvin “Buck” Barrow was to stand trial in San Antonio for car theft, Tookie and her two youngest boys accompanied the Barrows and their two youngest children as they traveled by horse and wagon, 300 miles south, to attend.

Both boys had big brothers named Clyde. W.D.’s brother Clyde drove his wife and Buck Barrow’s girlfriend Blanche across the country to Tennessee in the summer of 1930 to see Buck while he was on the lam. The Barrows, too, had been hit by disease in the West Dallas camp: Clyde, his father and his younger sister Marie were hospitalized by something so severe that years later Clyde was rejected by the Navy due to its lingering effects.

== Barrow Gang ==
By age 15 or 16, W.D. Jones was known to the local police. He hung around the Barrows' service station on Eagle Ford Road and collected license plates for LC’s older brothers Clyde and Buck to use on cars they stole. He was picked up in Dallas at least once "on suspicion" of car theft and was arrested with LC in Beaumont, Texas for car theft. On Christmas Eve 1932, Clyde Barrow and his friend Bonnie — already on the run, and glamorous outlaws to W.D. — stopped by home. Barrow was between assistants, and he and Parker brought Jones along with them when they left.

The next afternoon in Temple, Texas, in a botched attempt at stealing a car, Jones or Barrow shot and killed the car's owner, grocery clerk Doyle Johnson, a 27-year-old new father. Newspaper accounts reported that the fatal shots came from the passenger side of the car. According to Jones, Barrow used this report to make sure Jones wouldn’t dare leave the gang. Jones was indicted for Johnson's murder by a Bell County grand jury, but was not tried.

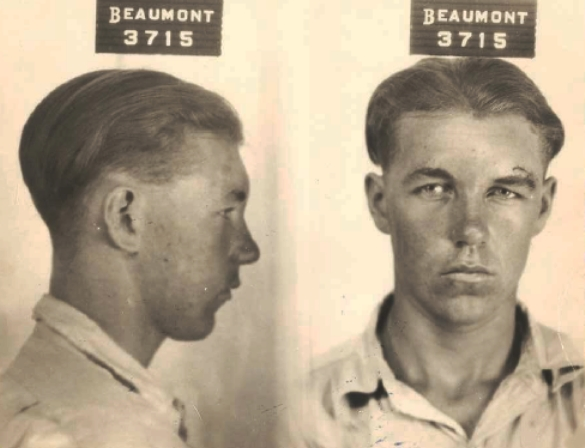
W.D. Jones at his first arrest, 1931. William Daniel Jones, 15, and friend LC Barrow were arrested after disappearing with, then wrecking, a bootlegger's car.

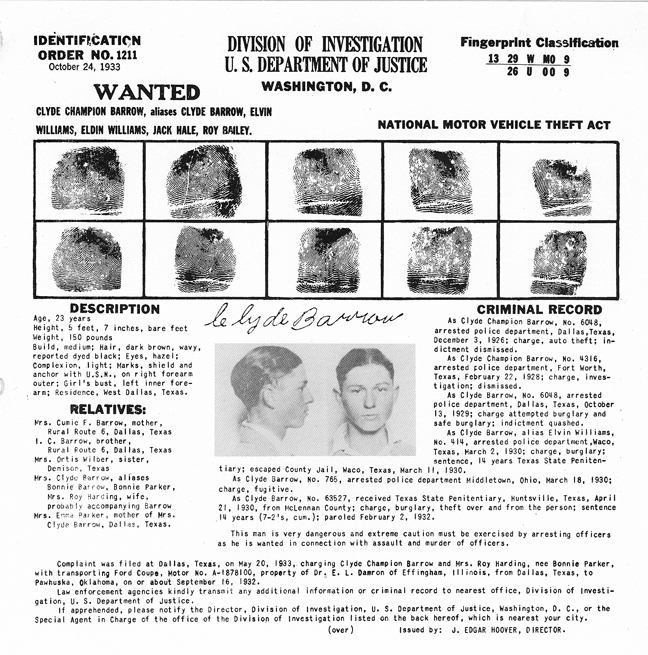
Clyde Barrow's wanted poster, October 1933

On the night of January 6, 1933 in Dallas, the three stumbled into a trap set for another criminal. Barrow killed Tarrant County Deputy Malcolm Davis, shooting him point-blank in the chest with a 16-gauge shotgun. Jones and Parker were waiting in the car for Barrow and were as startled as the neighbors were when gunfire broke out. Jones "grabbed a gun and began blasting the landscape." Parker shouted to him to stop, that he might hit someone, and she circled the car around the block to catch up with Barrow.

In his confession to police, Jones said that he was starting the motor while Parker fired her pistol out the passenger window. Thirty-five years later, he told Playboy magazine, "As far as I know, Bonnie never packed a gun.... during the five big gun battles I was with them, she never fired a gun." In October 1934, Jones was tried and convicted as an accessory to Deputy Davis' murder as part of an arrangement with Dallas County Sheriff R.A."Smoot" Schmid.

After the murder of Malcolm Davis, Barrow, Parker and Jones lay low. They drove through the hills of Missouri and Arkansas and may have wandered as far east as Tennessee. They made news only on the night of January 26, when they kidnapped Springfield, Missouri police officer Thomas Persell. Twice in early spring, they dressed up and photographed each other and their gun collection beside the road. They saw how their pictures came out at the same time as thousands of newspaper readers: in April the rolls of film were captured by police, developed, and published. The playful pictures brought unintended consequences, particularly one of Bonnie Parker squinting defiantly at the camera, her foot planted on the bumper of a stolen car, a gun at her outthrust hip and a cigar hanging from her mouth. Dallas County Deputy Sheriff Ted Hinton recalled that the "brazen pride" displayed in the pictures made law enforcement officers that much more determined to catch them.

The three returned to Dallas on March 24 or 25 and learned that on March 23, Clyde's older brother Buck had been pardoned from Huntsville penitentiary. On the night of March 25 they surprised Buck and his wife Blanche at Blanche's mother's home and persuaded Buck to vacation with them in strategically located Joplin, Missouri.

=== Joplin, Missouri ===
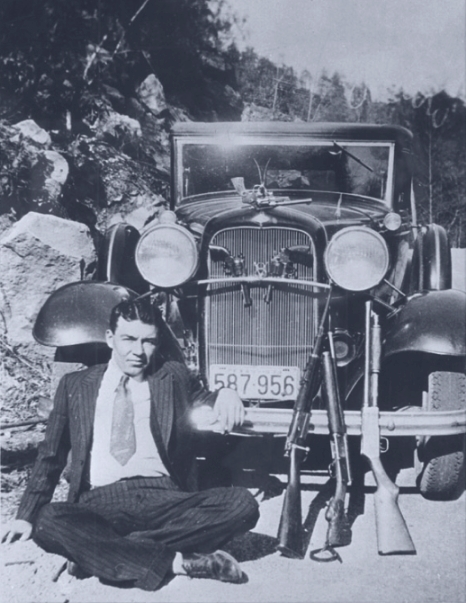
W.D. Jones posing with guns. Always proud of their arsenal, the Barrow gang "shot" it for a posterity they could not have imagined. The cut-down shotgun is one of Barrow's "whippit" guns. The pistol decorating the hood ornament is Officer Persell's.

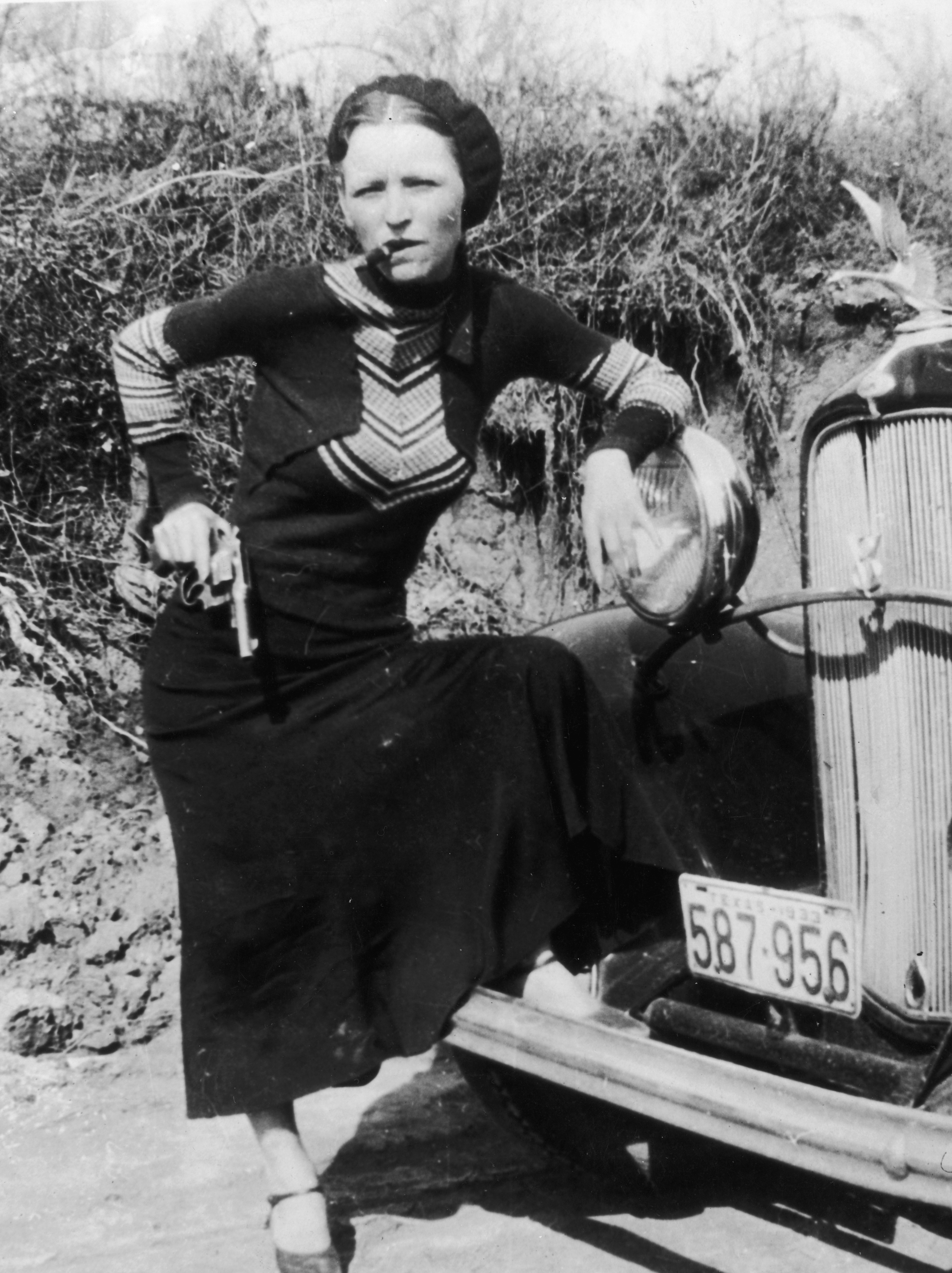
Parker poses with cigar and is branded by newspapers as "cigar smoking gun moll" based on film found at Joplin apartment

Jones was a combatant in the April 13, 1933 Joplin shootout with law officers in which Constable Wes Harryman and motor detective Harry McGinnis were killed by shotgun. Police estimated that this shootout lasted about one minute, from first shot to last. The most serious injury to the Barrows was to W.D. Jones. He was struck in the left side, possibly by a shot fired through the garage's glass window by Detective McGinnis or through the still-open garage door by Officer Harryman's only fired round, though Officer Kahler of the Missouri State Highway Patrol, recalling the battle in 1980, said that he shot Jones below the right shoulder blade, many seconds after the two fatally wounded officers were down.

The Barrows fled westward. They stopped once at a gas station for aspirin and rubbing alcohol. They moved Jones into the front seat and wrapped him in the blanket that usually covered the guns. Parker pried open his wound with knitting needles and poured rubbing alcohol into it. In the Texas Panhandle, somewhere near Shamrock or Amarillo, they pulled over to examine their wounds. "Clyde wrapped an elm branch in gauze and pushed it through the hole in my side and out my back. The bullet had gone clean through me so we knew it would heal."

The unexpected viciousness of the apartment dwellers' response, the haul of weaponry recovered, and especially the rolls of film they left behind made the Barrow Gang suddenly wanted and recognized far beyond Texas. In their immediate descriptions of the gun battle, the police officers remembered only two shooters, whom they named as Clyde and Buck Barrow. No witness remembered a third man. Jones was never correctly identified while he was with Clyde Barrow. When he had to introduce himself during his time with the Barrows, he used the name "Jack Sherman." From the Joplin photos, police variously identified him as Buck Barrow, Pretty Boy Floyd and Hubert Bleigh.

=== Ruston, Louisiana ===
Two weeks later on April 27, in the middle of a car theft in Ruston, Louisiana, still not recovered from his Joplin wounds and perhaps tired of the constant bickering in the car as well as afraid for his life, Jones disappeared from the gang. A fictionalized version of the Ruston car theft and subsequent kidnapping is the Gene Wilder-Evans Evans segment in Bonnie and Clyde. According to his statement to Dallas police November 18, "[T]hey [the Barrow brothers] put me out of the car to steal a Chevrolet automobile for them. I saw this was my chance to escape and I jumped in this car and made my getaway and came back to Dallas, Texas." The car he stole in Ruston was found 130 miles away, at the edge of the Mississippi River, in the eastern Arkansas railroad town of McGehee.

Clyde didn't want to believe that the docile W.D. had deliberately abandoned the gang, but to Buck it was obvious, and a relief, that "the kid" had. Jones made his way back to Dallas and spoke with Mrs. Barrow at least once while he was there. In late May the gang sent Blanche to Dallas to bring money and news to the families. Barrow instructed her to bring Jones with her to their rendezvous. When Blanche passed this request on, both mothers were polite, but demurred. Mrs. Barrow told Blanche faintly that "she did not know if he wanted to go with Clyde or not". LC and Mrs. Parker at least pretended to try to find him. Barrow arranged at least one more meeting, expressly asking his mother to find and return Jones then, but to no avail. On June 8 or 9 he and Parker drove into Dallas and picked him up themselves.

In his statement to Dallas police Jones said, "[A]bout two o'clock in the afternoon.... I was walking along the road intending to go down to the lake and to go to a dance at the Five Point Dancehall that night. Bonnie Parker and Clyde Barrow drove up from behind me and stopped. They were in a V8 Coupe....They spoke to me and told me to get in the car and I got in. They asked me if I wanted to go with them, and I told them I did not, and Clyde said I was going anyway, and I did." After this, even when the five-person gang had two cars, "Clyde always wanted W.D. to be in the car with him."

=== Wellington, Texas ===
On the night of June 10, racing to meet Buck and Blanche in Oklahoma, Barrow was driving too fast to notice a detour sign at the bridge over the Salt Fork of the Red River outside Wellington, Texas. "Suddenly the road disappeared." The car sailed into the air, turning over as it went, and crashed into the dry riverbed, rolling several times and coming to rest on its side. Battery acid poured onto Bonnie Parker, eating away the flesh of her right leg as she screamed and struggled. A farm family came to their aid, but quickly contacted police; "Bonnie told me I fired a shotgun there which wounded a woman in the hand." Barrow and Jones kidnapped the responding officers, Sheriff George Corry and Marshal Paul Hardy, to make their escape.

"Bonnie never got over that burn. Even after it healed over, her leg was drawn under her. She had to just hop or hobble along." Barrow, who limped himself, accommodated the new delays, expenses and detours her disability created in his life without hesitation, and while she healed he or Jones carried her wherever she needed to go.

The gang holed up in a tourist cabin in Fort Smith, Arkansas, tending Parker, unable to move on until she recovered — or died — from her catastrophic injury. "She'd been burned so bad none of us thought she was gonna live. The hide on her right leg was gone, from her hip down to her ankle. I could see the bone at places." During this time Barrow's love for Parker drove him to put his own life on the line several times to try to help her.

=== Fayetteville, Arkansas ===
With Barrow's attention focused on Parker, the problem of acquiring food and rent money fell to Buck and Jones. On June 23, as the two were fleeing the scene of a clumsy grocery store robbery fifty miles away in Fayetteville, they crested a hill southbound on Highway 71 and smashed into the back of a slower moving vehicle. The driver climbed out of his car and grabbed two rocks; the Barrows jumped out of their car, Buck with a shotgun and Jones with a BAR.

Town Marshal Henry Humphrey of Alma and Crawford County Deputy Sheriff Ansel M. "Red" Salyers were also on Highway 71, driving north toward Fayetteville to investigate the grocery store robbery. In the opposite lane the first car passed them — they waved to the driver, whom they knew — then seconds later came the speeding V-8. They heard the crash and turned around, and at the scene they recognized the V-8's Kansas plate. As Marshal Humphrey drew his gun and got out of the car, Buck shot him in the chest.

Jones fired a round from the BAR at Salyers. Salyers ducked behind his car and fired back with a rifle, then as Jones fumbled to reload he dashed toward a farmhouse. Buck's shotgun had jammed. He ran to Salyers's car, yelling to Jones to get Humphrey's pistol. From the farmhouse a hundred yards away, Salyers took aim and managed to shoot off two of Jones's fingertips as the robbers careered away in his automobile. A few miles from Fort Smith, Buck and Jones hijacked a couple's car at gunpoint, then realized the roads into Fort Smith were blocked. The car was found abandoned in the mountains. They staggered in the door of the tourist cabin ten hours after they had left. The Barrow Gang packed up what they could and decamped.

The next month, Deputy Salyers drove 500 miles to a hospital in Perry, Iowa, to get a final statement from the dying Buck Barrow. Barrow admitted to Salyers that he had murdered Marshal Humphrey, and that he and the man with him — who he finally confessed was "Jack Sherman"— had been shooting to kill them both. Officer Humphrey's pistol was found in the Barrows' debris at Dexfield Park. In November, Jones told police that he had been stunned in the car crash and his memory of any ensuing action was hazy, but he was confident that only Buck was shooting. He remembered standing in the highway looking for a gold ring he had lost. However, the following February at the harboring trial, Jones read a statement in which he said both he and Buck had killed Humphrey.

=== Platte City and Dexfield Park ===
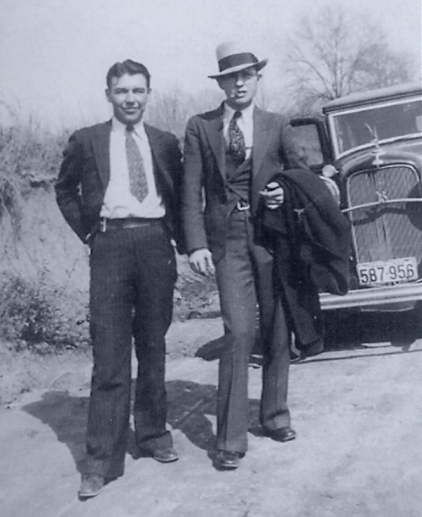
Barrow, Parker and Jones paused on a disused road to take pictures of themselves in the late winter or early spring of 1933.

On July 20 around 1:00 a.m, thirteen lawmen led by Sheriff Holt Coffey, protecting themselves from expected machine gun fire with metal shields, advanced on the double cabin at the Red Crown Tourist Court in Platte City, Missouri. In the ensuing firefight Buck Barrow was shot in the head as he and Blanche ran to get inside the garage. Jones had started the V8's engine but was afraid to open the garage door, then was afraid to help Blanche drag Buck inside. As they flew toward the highway Blanche was partly blinded by shards of glass from the car's exploding windows.

Clyde drove them north two hundred miles, running for a long time on flats, then rims, the floor of the car sloshing with Buck's blood. State and federal agents tracked them north following reports of blood-soaked and burned clothes and bandages in fields and on the sides of the road. The Barrow Gang hid in a brake of trees at the edge of an abandoned amusement park outside Dexter, Iowa. They attempted to leave the park the next day but, helplessly, returned: Buck's injuries were too severe.

During the night of July 24, 1933 nearly one hundred law officers, National Guardsmen and interested, armed, mostly deputized citizens — some with dates — crept up to the edges of the field, and as the sun rose a new shootout began. Parker, Barrow and Jones were badly wounded. Buck, unable to run, was shot six more times, and he and Blanche, who would not leave him, were captured. "Half stumbling, half swimming," Jones dragged and carried Parker a mile and a half while Barrow fought away the last of the posse. Bonnie told her sister that as she and W.D. hid in the brush, their wounds dripping blood, they heard distant gunfire and then a long silence.

Bonnie began to weep and to wish they had a gun with them, so she could die with Clyde. But eventually, Barrow crawled out of the woods. Gesturing with an empty pistol he commandeered a car from a farmer and the trio escaped.

They kept driving. Throughout August they plied the back roads from Nebraska to Minnesota to Mississippi, pausing in only the smallest towns to steal fresh cars and money for gas and food. They slept in the cars, parked in remote fields or woods or in ravines. The following winter, Barrow observed that he had not slept in a bed or even changed his clothes since his brother Buck was killed. Near the end of the month Barrow and Jones rebuilt the gang's security by robbing the armory at Plattville, Illinois of more BARs, handguns and ammunition.

Jones was as loyal a subordinate as Clyde and Bonnie could have hoped for, but he did not want to accompany them into death or even any farther into pain and fear. They were aware that Jones wanted to leave them. Nevertheless, Jones stayed until Barrow and Parker were well enough to take care of themselves without help. "I left Clyde and Bonnie after they was healed up enough to get by without me.... I'd had enough blood and hell."

According to Barrow family members, the three made their way back to West Dallas and split up there on September 7. This may have been the story Clyde and Bonnie told. According to W.D. Jones, they were forty miles outside of Clarksdale, Mississippi on the night in early September when he saw a way to escape. They had just stolen a new car and Barrow had given him $2.12 to fill its tank. Jones put in a few gallons, then drove ahead as if to find a secluded place to stop and change cars. But when he was out of Barrow's sight he turned down a country road, turned off the car's headlights, and sped up. After a few miles he left the car and fled for his mother's home in Houston.

=== Arrest and sentence ===
Jones kept a low profile after his return to Houston, picking cotton and digging vegetables on area farms to support himself. On November 16, 1933, he was arrested without incident in Houston by Dallas County deputies Bob Alcorn and Ed Caster, who drove him to the Dallas County jail. An acquaintance in Houston had identified him to police as the mystery Barrow accomplice.

It is possible that Barrow coached Jones on what to say if he was ever arrested, or that the two of them agreed on a basic theme for Jones's official story: that Clyde, Bonnie and Buck had done all the shooting and robbing and that W.D., a minor child, was an unwilling member of the gang, forced to ride with them at gunpoint, unconscious with fear or trauma most of the time, and chained to trees and car bumpers at night. Jones may or may not have had Barrow's blessing to blame every serious transgression on those who had nothing to lose, but on November 18, 1933, he relayed to Dallas police just such a story.

Dallas county possession of an important Barrow Gang member was an ace up the sleeve for the politically ambitious Sheriff Schmid, who kept Jones a secret for ten days, perhaps hoping Clyde Barrow would try to storm the jail and break Jones out. Jones for his part insisted that he was grateful to be safely behind bars. On the night of November 22 the sheriff and his deputies Alcorn, Caster and Hinton bungled an ambush of Barrow and Parker in Sowers, Texas, on the outskirts of Dallas. The Dallas press jeered loudly — even the newsboys hawked the story as "Sheriff escapes from Clyde Barrow!" — until Schmid put W.D. Jones on display. Wide-eyed and "shaking with fear," Jones met the press. His deal with Sheriff Schmid was apparent in the sensational headline, "Saw Clyde Shoot Deputy."

Jones and the sheriff agreed that he would be tried as an accessory to Clyde Barrow's January 6 murder in Dallas of Deputy Davis, which would protect him against extradition to Arkansas for the June 23 shootout on Highway 71 in which Marshal Humphrey was killed. "They tried me for killing a sheriff's man at Dallas," Jones told Playboy in 1968. "Clyde done it, but I was glad to take the rap. Arkansas wanted to extradite me, and I sure didn't want to go to no Arkansas prison. I figure now that if Arkansas had got me, one of them skeletons they've dug up there might have been me."

Jones was in the Dallas County jail on the morning of May 23, 1934, when Barrow and Parker were ambushed and killed on the Sailes-Gibsland road in north Louisiana. When reporters crowded in to tell him the news, he said, "I admit that I am relieved," and shook his head.

At his trial the following October all state witnesses recommended against the death penalty. Jones was convicted of a crime codified in 1931, "murder without malice." Though the district attorney and the prosecuting attorney recommended a sentence of 99 years, on October 12 the jury handed down a sentence of fifteen years.

In February 1935 Jones and nineteen other family members and associates of Barrow and Parker were defendants in the federal government's test-case trial en masse for "harboring." He received the maximum sentence for harboring, two years, applied to run concurrently with his Texas sentence. After six years in the Huntsville penitentiary he was paroled.

== After the Barrow Gang ==
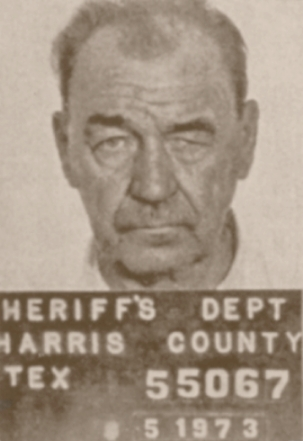
Deacon Jones in 1973

"There's a bullet in my chest, I think from a machine gun, birdshot in my face and buckshot in my chest and right arm." "When I tried to join the Army in World War Two after I got out of prison, them doctors turned me down because their X-rays showed four buckshot and a bullet in my chest and part of a lung blown away".

Jones lived the rest of his life in Houston, for many years next door to his mother. He married, but his wife died in the mid-1960s. He became addicted to pain-killing drugs. After 1967, the year Arthur Penn's romanticized film, Bonnie and Clyde, ignited a new generation's interest in the Barrow Gang, his arrests made the local news. Jones said of the film, "[It] made it all look sort of glamorous, but like I told them teenaged boys sitting near me at the drive-in showing: 'Take it from an old man who was there. It was hell.'" Local TV reporters had brought him to see the film.

In 1968 Jones described his life on the run with Bonnie and Clyde in a colorful interview with Playboy magazine and spoke here and there to young people warning them away from the life of crime. Later in the year he filed a petition against Warner Bros.-Seven Arts, charging that the filmmakers, who had never contacted him, had maligned his character by implying that he had played a role in the betrayal of Barrow and Parker. Nothing came of the filing.

"I've never lived it down," he said of his outlaw days. "I've tried but I guess I never will."

=== Death ===
In the early morning hours of August 20, 1974, Jones accompanied an acquaintance to a friend's home where she thought she would be given a place to sleep. The friend did not allow her in, an altercation ensued, and at 3:55 a.m. the friend shot Jones three times with a 12-gauge shotgun. He died in the driveway. "The man told police that Jones was a 'nice' person when sober but that he knew of Jones' reputation and was afraid of him." He was buried on August 22 at Brookside Memorial Park in Houston.

=== Date of birth ===
Marie Barrow, born in 1918, remembered Jones as being the same age as her brother LC, who was born in 1913, and that therefore he was not a minor in 1933. She may have confused Jones's birthday with Ray Hamilton's, May 21, 1913. In 1950 Jones filled out Social Security forms stating that he was born May 12, 1916, the same date he gave Dallas police in his November 1933 confession.

In 1968, he told Playboy he was 16 on Christmas Eve 1932, and that Clyde Barrow was seven years older than he. A news article noting an arrest in September 1973 gives his age as 59. His death certificate gives his age as 58 and lists his birthday as May 15. Since he filled out his Social Security forms himself, while a relative filled out his death certificate, it would be safe to assume that his birthday is May 12 — however, May 15, 1916, is the date on his gravestone. According to the 1920 federal census of Van Zandt County, Texas, J.Z. (James) and Tookie Jones were parents of the following children: Garrison – age 16; Slennie – age 13; Clyde – age 10; Herbert – age 7; and W.D. – age 3.

Another son, Roy Lee, was born in 1920, after the census information was taken. This supports W.D. Jones' claim of 1916 as his year of birth. He was listed as three years old as of January 15, the day the census enumerator visited.

== Bibliography ==
- Barrow, Blanche Caldwell, edited by John Neal Phillips (2005). My Life with Bonnie and Clyde. Norman: University of Oklahoma Press. ISBN 0-8061-3625-1.
- Bonnie and Clyde Joplin Shootout Documents. Joplin, Missouri Police Department
- FBI file 26-4114, four volumes of files held by the FBI that document the pursuit of the Barrow Gang. FBI Records and Information
- Guinn, Jeff (2009). Go Down Together: The True, Untold Story of Bonnie and Clyde. New York: Simon & Schuster. ISBN 1-4165-5706-7.
- Hinton, Ted, as told to Larry Grove (1979). Ambush: The Real Story of Bonnie and Clyde. Austin, Tex.: Shoal Creek Publishers, Inc. ISBN 0-88319-041-9.
- Jones confession, November 18, 1933. Transcribed, W.D. Jones account. Dexter, Iowa Community Website The original transcript of the first part of Jones's confession is reproduced at FBI file 26-4114 Section Sub A, pp. 59–62. FBI Records and Information
- Jones, W.D. "Riding with Bonnie and Clyde." Playboy November 1968. Transcribed, Cinetropic
- Interview with Officer George B. Kahler (ret.), 1980. To Serve and Protect: A Collection of Memories (2006). Missouri State Highway Patrol, pp. 16–25.
- Knight, James R. and Jonathan Davis (2003). Bonnie and Clyde: A Twenty-First Century Update. Austin, TX: Eakin Press. ISBN 1-57168-794-7.
- Methvin v. Oklahoma (selection). The Trial of Henry Methvin
- Milner, E.R. (1996). The Lives and Times of Bonnie and Clyde. Carbondale: University of Southern Illinois Press. ISBN 0-8093-1977-2.
- Parker, Emma Krause, Nell Barrow Cowan, and Jan I. Fortune (1968). The True Story of Bonnie and Clyde. New York: New American Library. ISBN 0-8488-2154-8. Originally published in 1934 as Fugitives.
- Phillips, John Neal (2002). Running with Bonnie & Clyde: The Ten Fast Years of Ralph Fults. Norman: University of Oklahoma Press. ISBN 0-8061-3429-1.
- Ramsey, Winston G., ed. (2003). On The Trail of Bonnie and Clyde, Then and Now. London: After The Battle Books. ISBN 1-870067-51-7.
