= Anslem Richardson =

American actor

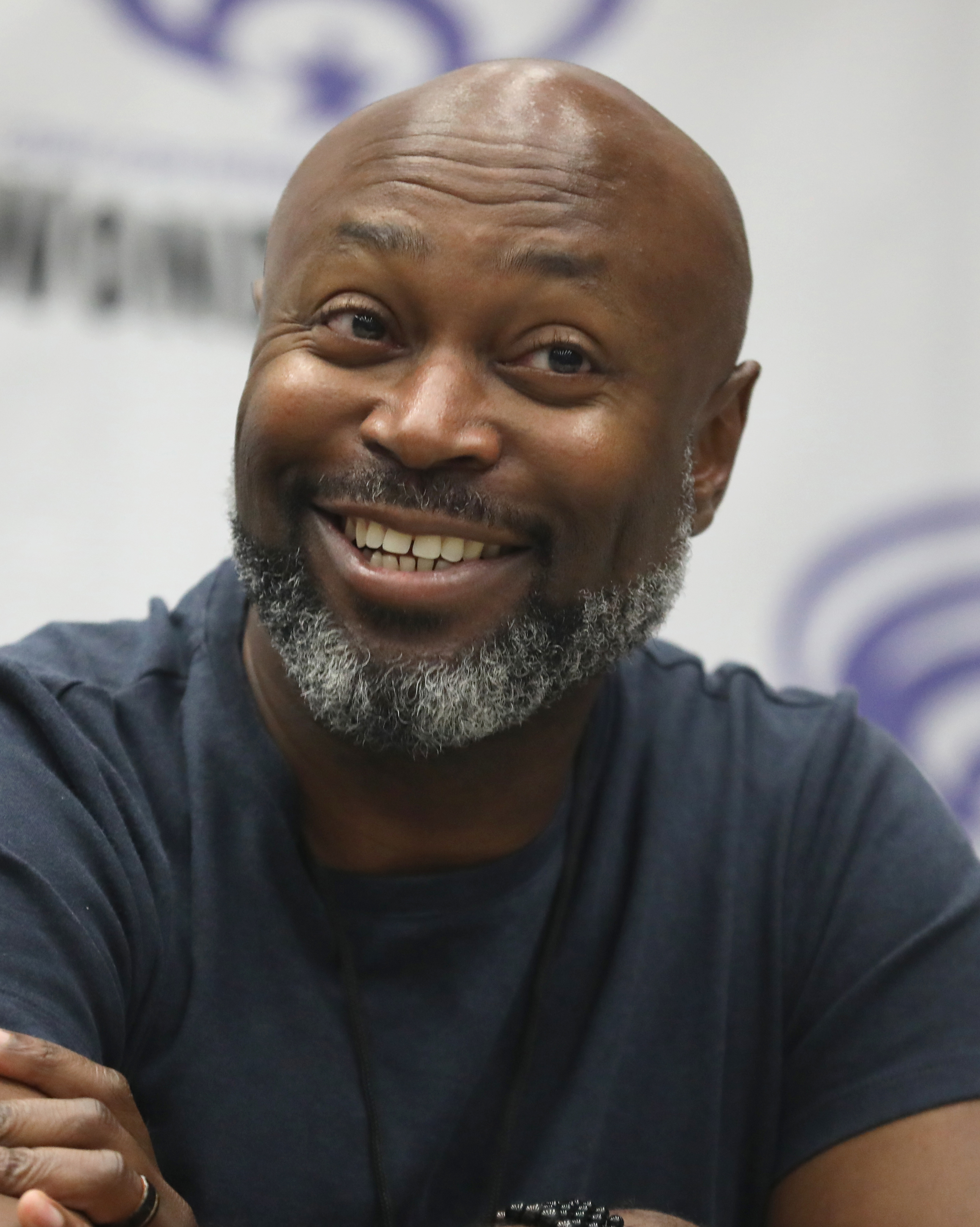
- Richardson at the 2024 WonderCon
- Born: Brooklyn, New York
- Occupations: Actor; screenwriter; filmmaker; visual artist
- Years active: 2001–present

Anslem Richardson is an American film, television and theater actor, filmmaker, and visual artist of Trinidadian descent. He is best known for his role as Mike in The Locksmith and Governor Khaled on NCIS: Los Angeles.

== Early life and education ==
Born in Brooklyn, New York, Richardson studied at Florida State University, graduating with a B.A. in Creative Writing

== Career ==
=== Acting ===
After working several years on Off-Off Broadway plays, booking a role in Third Watch and the voice of Steven in Rockstar San Diego's Midnight Club II a racing video game, Richardson starred lead in the short film WHOA directed by Maurice Dwyer, which was an Official Selection of the 2002 Sundance Film Festival. He followed that up with a co-lead role in the acclaimed 2003 short film Five Deep Breaths directed by Seith Mann. Five Deep Breaths was an Official Selection of the Cannes, Sundance, Tribeca, and IFP Film Festivals; it went on to accumulate 16 awards.

At Cannes, he met the casting directors for the multi-award-winning, critically acclaimed Off-Broadway play The Exonerated written by husband and wife team Erik Jensen and Jessica Blank. Based on interviews they conducted with more than 40 exonerated death row inmates, the play starred Richard Dreyfuss, Susan Sarandon, Aidan Quinn, and Delroy Lindo and was directed by Bob Balaban. The Exonerated won the 2003 Drama Desk, Lucille Lortel, Outer Critics Circle, Fringe First, and Herald Angel Awards. Richardson joined the production for its final run and appeared in the 2005 Court TV film adaptation starring Brian Dennehy, Danny Glover, Delroy Lindo, Aidan Quinn, and Susan Sarandon; directed by Balaban.

In 2011 and 2012, Richardson appeared in the ABC police drama Detroit 1-8-7 and had a recurring guest star role on NCIS: Los Angeles as Gov. Khaled. He joined Katie Aselton's second feature Black Rock, based on a screenplay by her husband Mark Duplass; which starred Aselton, Lake Bell, and Kate Bosworth. The film premiered at the 2012 Sundance Film Festival and was released theatrically on May 17, 2013.

In 2014, he appears in The Amazing Spider-Man 2 directed by Marc Webb as Times Square Cop.

=== Writing ===
In 2004, Richardson wrote his first screenplay The Subway Story., which won the Independent Filmmaker Project's Gordon Parks Award for Outstanding African-American Screenwriting. In 2005, he returned to Sundance for a third time as the lead in the short film Choked by the filmmaking brothers Brad and Todd Barnes. In this time, he booked roles on Law & Order: Criminal Intent, Law & Order: Trial By Jury, Freedomland directed by Joe Roth, and The Life Before Her Eyes by Vadim Perelman.

In 2008, he completed his second screenplay Bardos, which earned him the Tribeca All Access Creative Promise Award in Screenwriting. Anslem formed the production company ThisThing Films with partner Marin Gazzaniga. Their first short film production LIKE SO MANY THINGS...UNSAID became a finalist for the IFC/Redbull Media Labs Competition. It spawned the 2009 American web series Like So Many Things which aired on IFC and at IFC.com. That year, Richardson re-teamed with the Barnes Brothers to star as the lead in their feature directorial debut Homewrecker. Homewrecker became an Official Selection of the 2010 Sundance Film Festival and was winner of the inaugural Sundance Best of NEXT Award. Richardson was later awarded the Maverick Actor Award at the Method Fest Film Festival for his role as Mike. The film's title was later changed to The Locksmith for distribution by First Look Studios.

Richardson has written for several television series, including Timeless, Agent X and The Boys (where he was also a co-producer).
