= Henry Methvin =

Member of the Barrow Gang

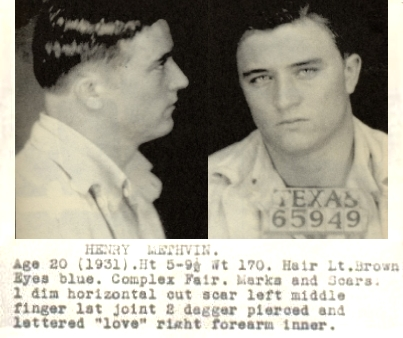
- Born: April 8, 1912; Louisiana, United States
- Died: April 19, 1948 (aged 36); Sulphur, Louisiana, US
- Occupation: Bank robber
- Status: Escaped in 1934; Paroled in 1942
- Convictions: Armed robbery Murder
- Penalty: 10 years imprisonment Life imprisonment

Henry Methvin (April 8, 1912 – April 19, 1948) was an American criminal, a bank robber, and a Depression-era outlaw. He is best remembered as the final member of Bonnie and Clyde's gang. His role in the gang has often been misattributed to teenage gang member W. D. Jones as both men were portrayed as composite character "C. W. Moss" in the film Bonnie and Clyde (1967).

== Biography ==
=== Early life ===
Henry Methvin was born in Louisiana on April 8, 1912, to Ivan "Ivy" T. Methvin and Avie Stephens.

=== Barrow gang ===
Methvin was serving a 10-year prison sentence at the Eastham prison farm in Huntsville, Texas when Bonnie and Clyde came to break out Raymond Hamilton on January 16, 1934. One guard was killed and another wounded in the prison break. In the confusion, Methvin and three other inmates took the opportunity to escape with Hamilton. Though Hamilton initially ordered them to go back, Clyde welcomed the convicts and offered to let them join the gang. Though the three other opportunistic inmates chose to take their chances alone, Methvin accepted Clyde's offer to stay. He remained with the gang until their end four months later.

About a month after the breakout, on February 19, Methvin joined Hamilton and Barrow in stealing guns and ammunition from a National Guard armory in Ranger, Texas, under the cover of darkness. Eight days later, the men used the weapons to steal $4,138 from a bank in Lancaster. Bonnie and Clyde agreed to drive Methvin to visit his father near Gibsland, Louisiana, on March 1. Methvin was present when, on April 1, the gang shot and killed Texas state troopers E. B. Wheeler and H. D. Murphy.

Conflicting reports from relatives and alleged eyewitnesses have implicated each of the four gang members. Barrow was inconsistent about who he believed was the shooter. He wrote to relatives blaming Methvin, who he claimed had misunderstood Barrow's suggestion that they "take" the troopers, meaning to disarm and take them for a "joyride", and instead opened fire. In a later letter to authorities, Barrow named Hamilton as the killer.

Regardless of Methvin's role, he was part of another of the gang's murders five days later. On April 6, their car became stuck in mud near Commerce, Oklahoma. While trying to get the car moving, they were surprised by two local officers out on patrol and fired at them. Constable Cal Campbell was killed, and Police Chief Percy Boyd was wounded. Boyd was taken hostage by the gang and later released at Mangle Corner, near Fort Scott, Kansas. The next day, while eating at a cafe in Stillwater, they abruptly left when a patrolman passed by. Methvin and the gang remained on the run for the next few months.

On April 30, Methvin took part in a Kansas bank robbery with the Barrow gang, joined by Joe Palmer, and they escaped with $2,800. On May 1, the gang was identified in a bank robbery in Sac City, Iowa. Two days later they took $700 from a bank in Everly. They traveled south to meet relatives in Dallas on May 6, and another family meeting with Methvin's father in Louisiana. On May 19, Methvin was sent into a diner to get sandwiches for the gang. While he was at the counter, a police car passed the diner, and Clyde drove off, leaving Methvin behind. He hitchhiked to Ruston, where his parents were living at the time.

According to most versions of the story, Methvin told his father that the gang had planned a spot for a rendezvous in the event that any of the gang were separated. Methvin was supposed to meet the gang on a deserted stretch of highway south of Arcadia. Ivan Methvin, then being harassed by lawmen in pursuit of his son and the rest of the gang, was alleged to have given this information to Louisiana sheriff Henderson Jordan, who then passed it on to Texas Ranger Frank Hamer. In exchange, Methvin was promised that his son would not get the death penalty for the murders of Troopers Wheeler and Murphy in Grapevine, Texas two months earlier. It is unclear whether Henry Methvin was aware of this arrangement.

On May 23, 1934, Ivan Methvin parked his truck near the meeting spot and removed one of the wheels as if changing a flat tire. When Bonnie and Clyde stopped to assist Methvin, Hamer gave the signal and his six-man posse fired, killing both of them. An alternate scenario in the 1990s, supposedly suppressed for over 60 years, claimed that Ivan Methvin had been forced to go along with the ambush. He was stopped by lawmen on the highway and tied to a tree while his truck was parked on the road so that Bonnie and Clyde would slow and be looking in the wrong direction when the ambush was sprung. Afterwards Hamer reassured Ivan Methvin that Henry had not been present or killed, and made a deal with him that Henry would not be charged for the Grapevine killings in exchange for Ivan Methvin saying nothing about unlawful confinement.

Although Henry Methvin avoided legal culpability for the Grapevine murders, his arrangement did not preclude prosecution for the Oklahoma murder of Constable Campbell. While he was locked up in the county jail, he and another prisoner tried to escape by overpowering the jailer. Their plan was to rush the jailer and the other prisoner would stab the jailer to death with a large pocket knife they had concealed in their cell. The jailer, a Seneca Cayuga Native American man by the name of Tom Armstrong, overpowered Methvin and the escape was foiled. Another inmate helped the jailer by securing the other prisoner until Armstrong was able to detain Methvin.

Methvin spent the rest of his pre-trial time in the hole. He was found guilty of Constable Campbell's murder and sentenced to death on December 20, 1935. His sentence was commuted to life imprisonment on September 18, 1936. He was paroled on March 20, 1942. Methvin continued to remain in trouble with the law. In November 1945, he was jailed for fighting and carrying a shotgun. Eleven months later he was arrested for attempted robbery and drunk driving near Shreveport, Louisiana.

=== Death ===
On April 19, 1948, Methvin was intoxicated while attempting to cross a railroad track and was killed by an oncoming train. Although it has been speculated that his death was retribution for the deaths of Bonnie and Clyde, especially after the similar death of his father Ivan 16 months earlier, no evidence of foul play has ever been produced.

== In modern popular culture ==
=== Television ===
- Garrett Kruithof portrayed Henry Methvin in the 2013 miniseries Bonnie & Clyde which aired on Lifetime, the History Channel and A&E in December 2013.
- Billy Wickman portrayed Methvin in the Timeless first season episode "Last Ride of Bonnie & Clyde", which aired on NBC in December 2016.
- Jake Dashnaw portrayed Methvin in the 2019 Netflix film The Highwaymen. W. Earl Brown portrayed his father, Ivan Methvin.
