= Ralph Fults =

American outlaw (1911–1993)

- Fults' mug shot in 1935
- Born: Ralph Smith Fults; January 23, 1911; Anna, Texas, U.S.
- Died: March 16, 1993 (aged 82); Dallas, Texas, U.S.
- Occupation: Security guard
- Spouse: Edna Ruth Temple (m. 1945)
- Children: 3
- Status: Pardoned in 1944
- Conviction: Armed robbery (1935)
- Penalty: 50 years' imprisonment

Ralph Smith Fults (January 23, 1911 – March 16, 1993) was a Depression-era outlaw and escape artist associated with Raymond Hamilton, Bonnie Parker and Clyde Barrow of the Barrow Gang.

== Early life ==
Fults was born in Anna, Texas on January 23, 1911. His father was a U.S. postal worker.

Fults was first arrested at age 14, in Aspermont, Texas, after police found him carrying a suitcase full of stolen goods. Fults escaped from the town's jail a week later after making a key from an old tobacco can. With the town sheriff attending the county fair, Fults started a mass jailbreak, letting the remaining inmates out of jail. Fults was soon recaptured and incarcerated in the Gatesville State School, from which he escaped on April 16, 1927.

In 1929, Fults was arrested and convicted of burglary after selling stolen cigarettes to a grocer in Greenville, Texas. Given a two-year prison sentence, Fults arrived in Huntsville Prison on June 16. He was eventually transferred to Eastham prison farm, from which he escaped with two other inmates on April 8, 1930. Recaptured five months later while burgling a hardware store in St. Louis, he was sent back to Texas, where he received a parole on August 16, 1931.

== Barrow gang ==
Nineteen year old Fults met Clyde Barrow in the back of a "one-way wagon", the name given to prison buses in Texas under Bud Russell. They were being transported to Eastham Prison Farm in Huntsville, Texas. Fults had previously escaped and was retaliated against by guards. The inmates were warned that anybody that associated with him would be punished, but Clyde refused to stop openly associating with Fults. While incarcerated, the two inmates began to plan a raid on the farm when they got out, where they would release as many fellow inmates as possible.

During his time in prison, Fults became acquainted with many criminals and outlaws of the "public enemy era". He helped smuggle hacksaw blades to bank robber Ray Hamilton to escape from jail in McKinney, Texas on January 27, 1932.

Fults joined up with Hamilton on March 22 and, along with Bonnie Parker and Clyde Barrow, attempted to rob a hardware store in Mabank, Texas. After the night watchmen sounded the alarm, the four fled in a stolen car until Barrow drove into a mud hole, which bogged the car down. Although Barrow and Hamilton were able to escape on foot, Fults and Parker were arrested by arriving police.

Fults was sentenced to ten years' imprisonment on May 11, 1932. He was granted a pardon by Governor Miriam A. Ferguson shortly before she left office, on January 10, 1935.

== Reuniting with Hamilton ==
He rejoined Hamilton less than a month later and the pair stole eight Browning BARs from a National Guard armory in Beaumont, Texas. After stealing a car in Tulsa, Oklahoma on February 24, he and Hamilton headed for Texas after managing to evade a police ambush while passing through McKinney.

On March 19, 1935, the two gave an interview to a Houston journalist detailing inhumane treatment in the Texas penal system. That same afternoon, he and Hamilton robbed a grocery store in San Antonio. Three days later, while driving towards Mississippi, the two stopped at the Louisiana site where Bonnie and Clyde had been killed the previous year. Stealing a car in Hattiesburg, Mississippi on March 27, he and Hamilton robbed a bank at Prentiss, Mississippi the following day.

After this latest robbery, the two separated, with Fults boarding a train to Louisville, Kentucky and Hamilton returning to Texas. After his arrival in Springfield, Illinois on April 5, Fults had learned of Hamilton's arrest at Fort Worth that same day and immediately took the first bus bound for Texas. Fults reached Fort Worth on April 8 and, although perhaps planning to save his old partner from the electric chair, he instead drove to his mother's home in McKinney. Stealing a car from Renner, Texas on April 12, 1935, he and an unidentified accomplice stole $900 from an oil refinery in Graham, Texas.

Captured by police in Denton County, Texas on April 17, his crime spree came to an end. He was returned to Huntsville prison until his extradition to Mississippi to face bank robbery charges. Convicted in September 1935, he was sentenced to fifty years' imprisonment at the Parchman prison farm. He was put in solitary confinement for leading a prison strike. He was pardoned in 1944 and assumed a legitimate profession as a security guard at an orphanage.

== Later years ==
Fults ran the huge laundry facility, at Buckner Baptist Children's Home, located at 5200 S. Buckner Blvd., in Dallas, Texas. He converted to Christianity and spoke to the children about the evils of a life of crime.

In 1960, Fults helped create a local television program called Confession. On this program, in a panel format, Fults and representatives of the Texas State Board of Pardons and Paroles and of the state prison system discussed the unique needs of former prisoners and the importance of offering them jobs, with former inmates, businesspeople, and attorneys. Through the efforts of Norman Vincent Peale the program was nationally syndicated. Fults died in Dallas on March 16, 1993, at the age of 82.
