= Barrow Gang =

American gang active between 1932 and 1934

The Barrow Gang was an American gang active between 1932 and 1934. They were well known outlaws, robbers, murderers, and criminals who, as a gang, traveled the Central United States during the Great Depression. Their exploits were known all over the nation. They captured the attention of the American press and its readership during what is sometimes referred to as the 'public enemy era'. Though the gang was notorious for the bank robberies they committed, they preferred to rob small stores or gas stations over banks. The gang was believed to have killed at least nine police officers, among several other murders.

The gang was best known for two of its members, Bonnie Parker and Clyde Barrow, an unmarried couple. Clyde Barrow was the leader. Other members included:

- Clyde's older brother Marvin "Buck" Barrow
- Buck Barrow's wife Blanche Barrow
- W. D. Jones
- Henry Methvin
- Raymond Hamilton
- Joe Palmer
- Ralph Fults

== Gallery ==
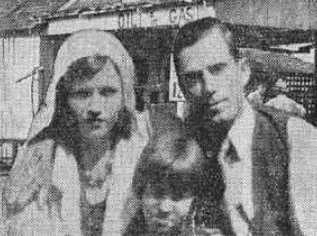
Blanche and Buck Barrow 1931

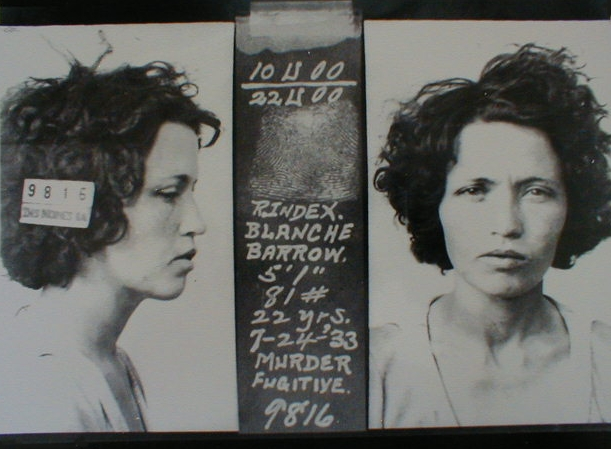
July 27, 1933 – Blanche Barrow

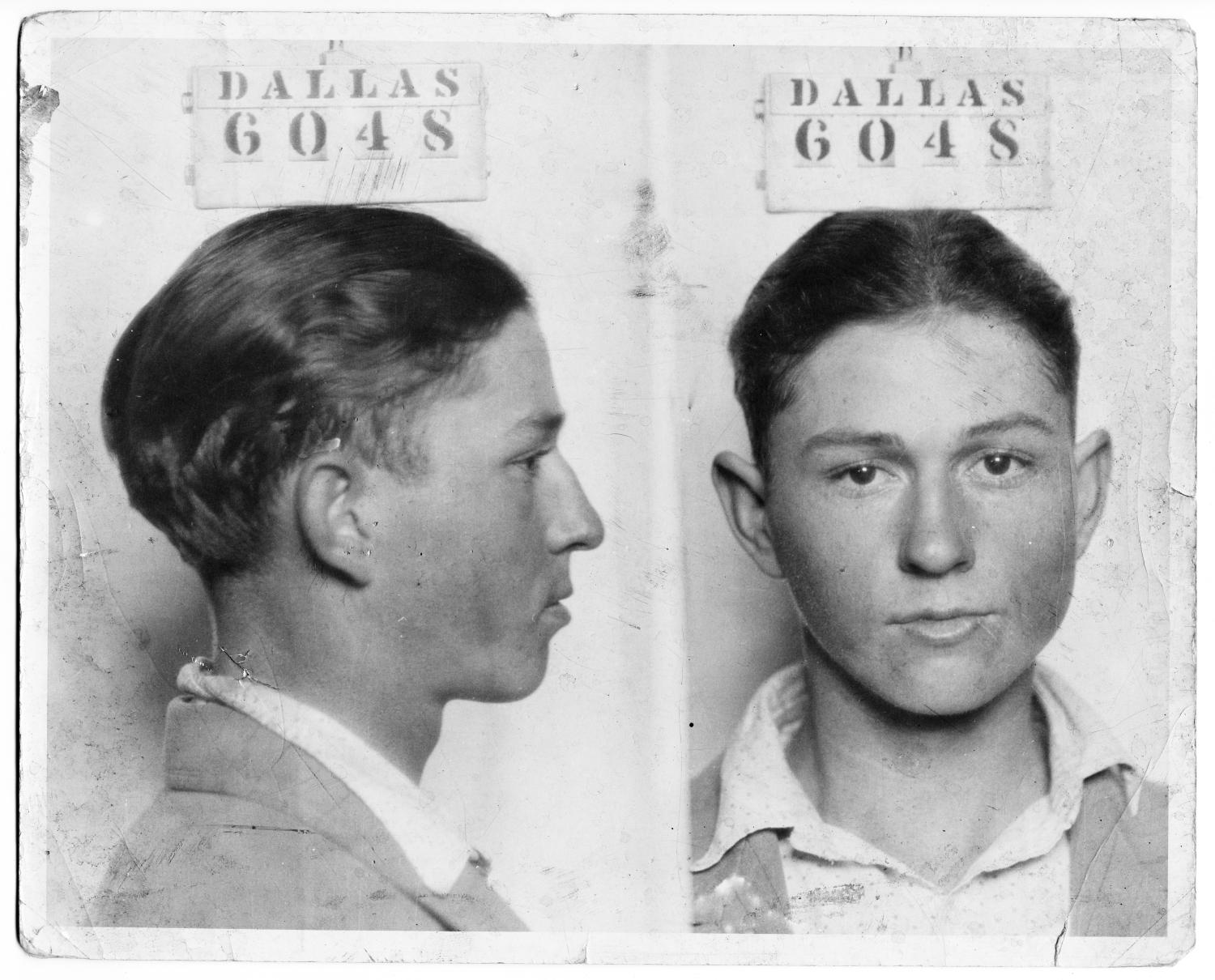
Clyde Barrow age 17 in a 1926 mugshot

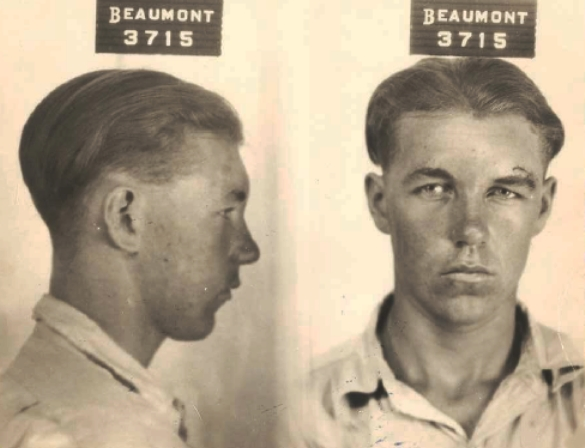
22 October 1931, W. D. Jones, 15, and friend LC Barrow were arrested after disappearing with, then wrecking, a bootlegger's car.

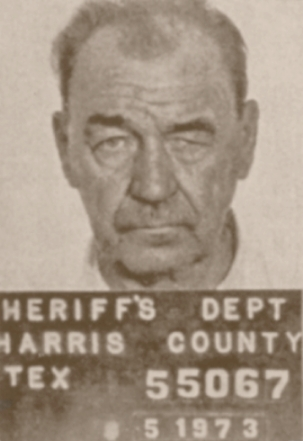
W. D. "Deacon" Jones in 1973

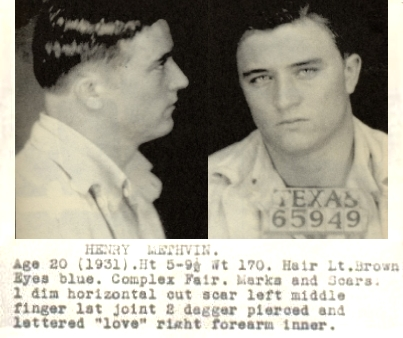
Mug shot of Henry Methvin, December 1931, age 20
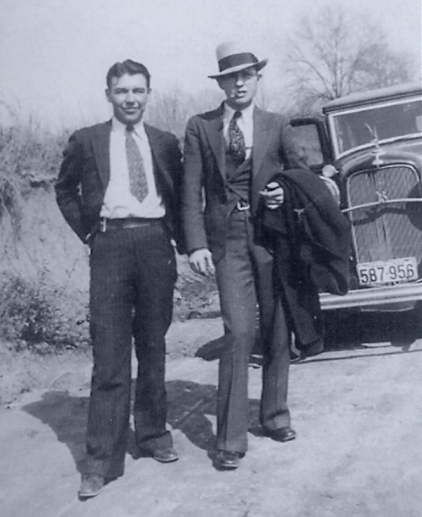
Barrow, Parker and Jones paused on a disused road to take pictures of themselves in the late winter or early spring of 1933.

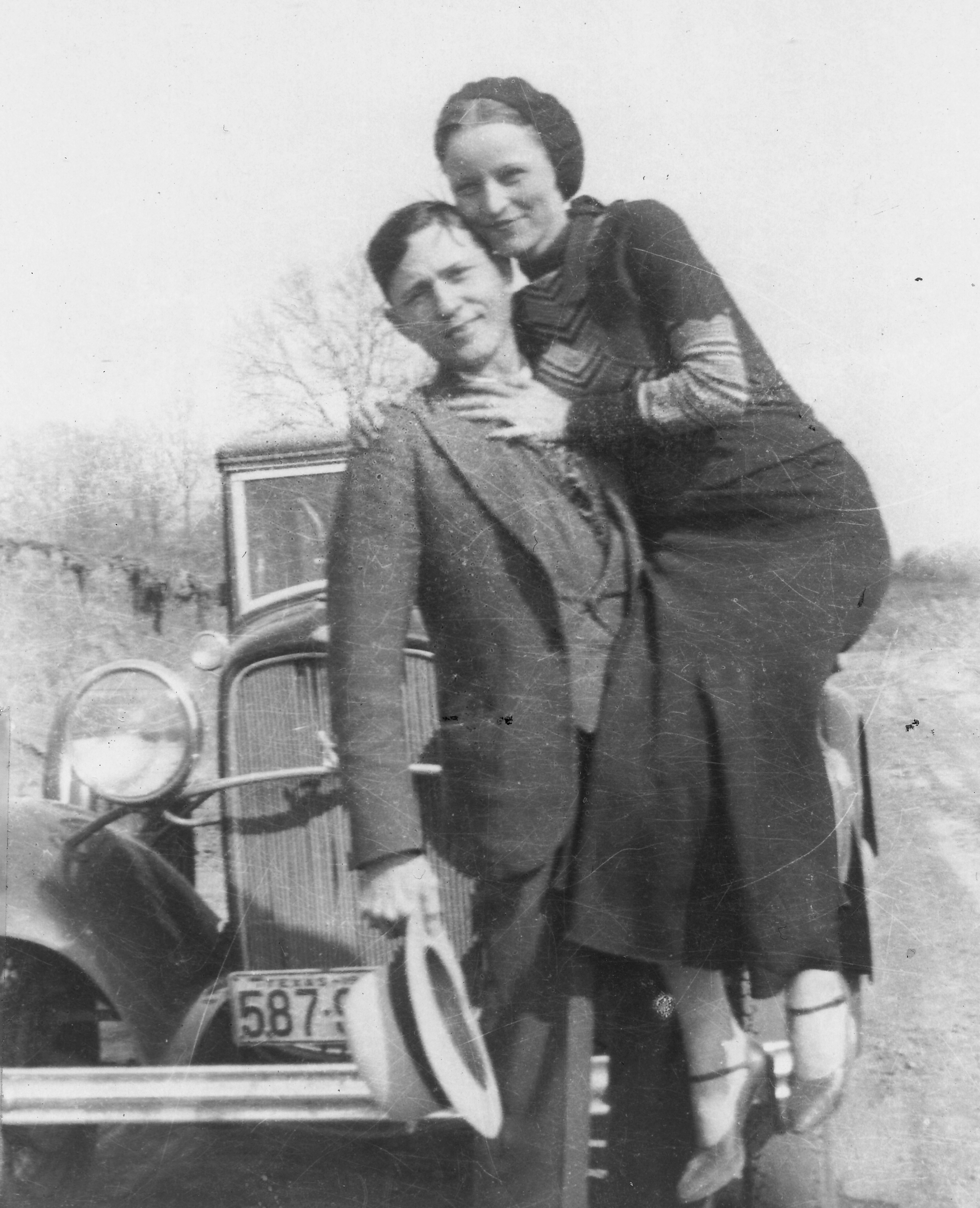
Clyde Barrow and Bonnie Parker—picture found by Joplin Missouri Police

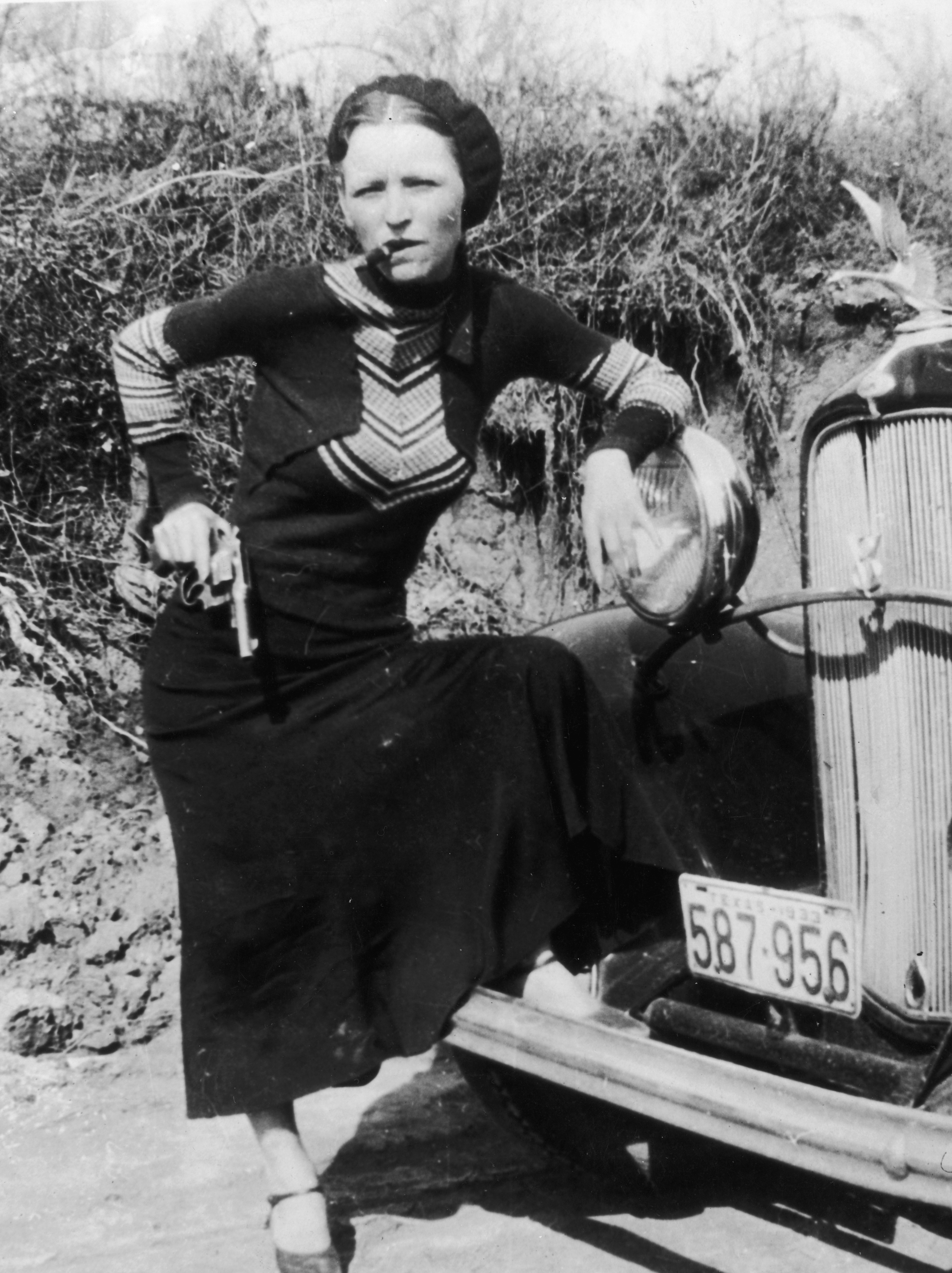
Parker's playful pose with a cigar brands her in the press as a "cigar-smoking gun moll" when police find the undeveloped film in the Joplin hideout

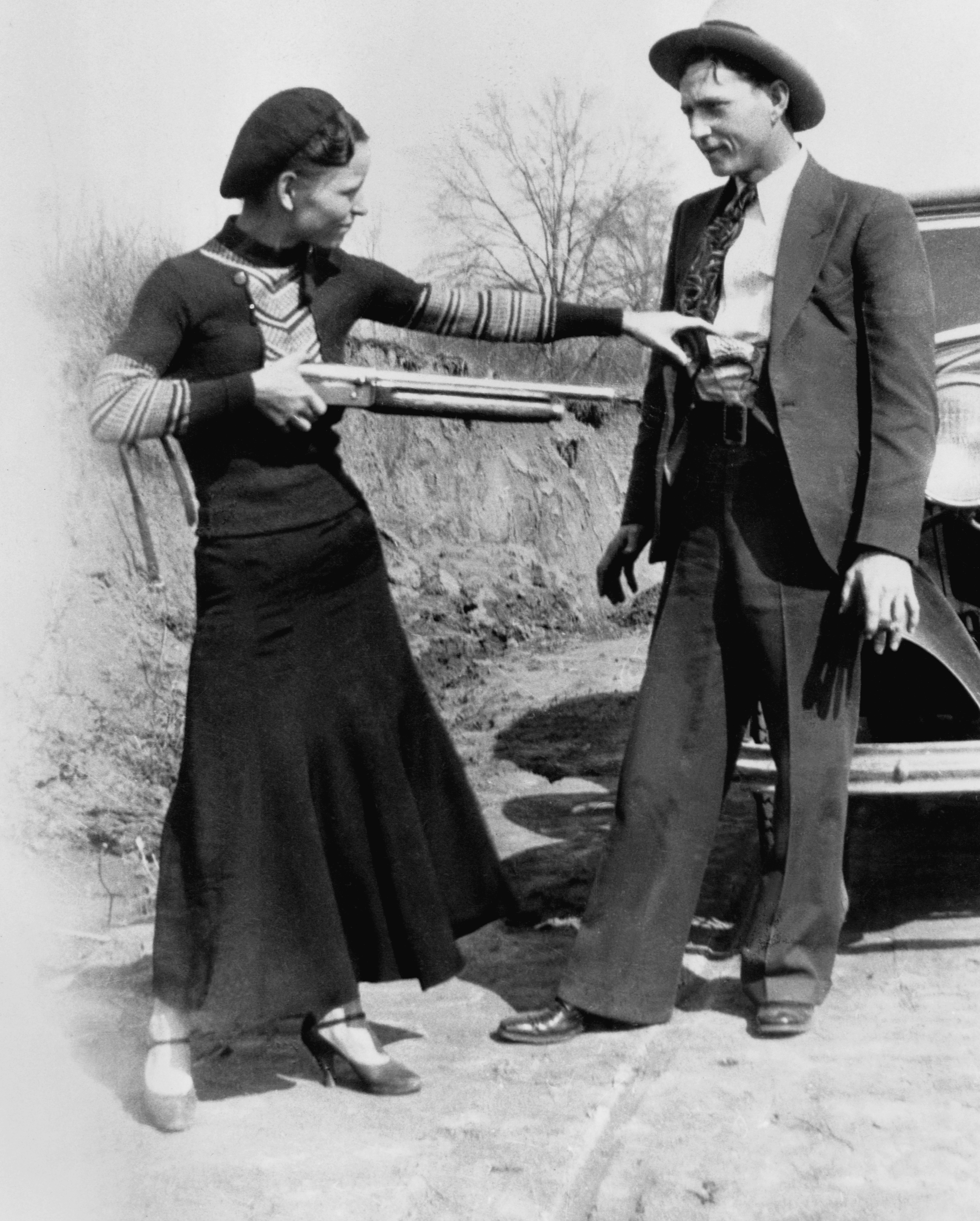
Bonnie with a shotgun reaches for officer Persell's pistol in Clyde's waistband.

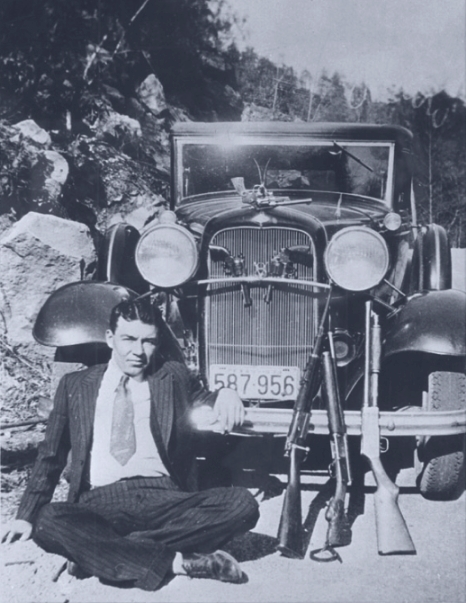
W. D. Jones and the gang's guns, April 1933. The cut-down shotgun is one of Barrow's "whippit" guns. The pistol decorating the hood ornament is Officer Persell's.

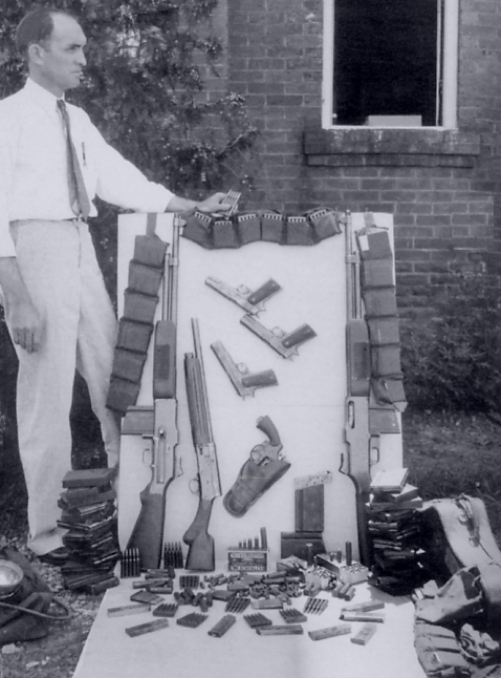
Over a dozen guns and several thousand rounds of ammunition from Bonnie Parker's shotgun, (including 100 20-round BAR magazines) were found in the perforated Ford after the deaths of Bonnie and Clyde.

== See also ==
- Public enemy
