= Raymond Hamilton =

American gangster (1914-1935)

- Born: Raymond Elzie Hamilton; May 21, 1914; Oklahoma, U.S.
- Died: May 10, 1935 (aged 20); Huntsville Unit, Texas, U.S.
- Resting place: Elmwood Memorial Park, Dallas, Texas, U.S.
- Occupations: Crime, gangster
- Known for: Member of the Barrow Gang
- Status: Executed by electrocution
- Conviction: Murder with malice
- Penalty: Death
- Accomplices: Mary O'Dare; Katie Jenkins (a.k.a. Katie Kemper)

Raymond Elzie Hamilton (May 21, 1914 – May 10, 1935) was a member of the notorious Barrow Gang during the early 1930s. By the time he was 20 years old, he had accumulated a prison sentence of 362 years.

== Early life ==
Raymond Hamilton was born May 21, 1914, in a tent on the banks of the Deep Fork River in Oklahoma. His father was John Henry Hamilton who abandoned the family when Raymond was 10 years old. His mother was Sara Alice Bullock. Raymond had one brother, Floyd Hamilton (1908-1984), and four sisters – Lilly Hamilton, Lucy Hamilton, Margie Hamilton, and Audrey Hamilton.

Sarah moved the family to West Dallas, where Raymond was raised and where he received his minor public education. Little is known about Hamilton's childhood. He began skipping school at a young age. He used to fence stolen bicycles through future sheriff Smoot Schmid and began committing petty thefts.

== The Barrow Gang ==
Hamilton met Clyde Barrow who lived in the same neighborhood when they were boys, and later joined the "Barrow Gang". Hamilton was involved in the killing of Deputy Sheriff Eugene C. Moore, when Moore and Sheriff Charlie Maxwell became suspicious of the men at an outdoor country dance in Stringtown, Oklahoma. Sheriff Maxwell sustained six gunshot wounds in the exchange but survived. It was Barrow's and Hamilton's first murder of a police officer. The group had drawn suspicion because they were well-dressed strangers at a small-town dance, and some local boys were upset that they were dancing with the local girls. The police, assuming the strangers were just bootleggers, originally intervened to prevent a fight.

Hamilton's presence in the group was often problematic, with Clyde Barrow and other members of the gang commonly referring to his girlfriend Mary O'Dare as "the washerwoman." Mary was the sister of local criminal and early partner of Clyde – O'Dell Chambless. When Hamilton was imprisoned at the Eastham prison farm north of Huntsville, Texas, Bonnie and Clyde raided the farm to free him and four other prisoners on January 16, 1934.

One of the other escapees, Joe Palmer, mortally wounded guard M.J. Crowson and caused a series of events which led to Texas Prison System chief Lee Simmons to issue a shoot to kill order against Clyde Barrow and Bonnie Parker. Simmons hired ex-Texas Ranger Frank Hamer, who formed a six-man posse in order to execute this order.

After a quarrel between Bonnie and Clyde, Hamilton's girlfriend Mary had suggested that Bonnie put something in Clyde's drink to knock him out, and they would take his money and leave. Bonnie immediately told Clyde. Clyde also observed through a rearview mirror that Hamilton was putting some of their robbery money in his pocket. Hamilton left the Barrow Gang after the fight about Mary O'Dare and was recaptured by authorities on April 25, 1934. He was in prison when Clyde Barrow and Bonnie Parker were ambushed and killed by Hamer's posse on May 23, 1934.

Hamilton escaped and went on a crime spree with another former Barrow gang member Ralph Fults. In February 1935, Fults and Hamilton burglarized a National Guard Armory in Beaumont, Texas, taking two Thompson submachine guns. After stealing a car in Tulsa, Oklahoma on February 24, they headed for Texas. They evaded an ambush in McKinney, Texas by capturing and disarming the posse.

On March 10, 1935, the two gave an interview to Houston reporter Harry McCormick. The two discussed the inhumane conditions of the Texas prison system. To keep McCormick from facing charges for harboring, they staged it to look like a kidnapping, and McCormick was left tied up. Hamilton left his fingerprints as proof of identity.

Hamilton was recaptured April 5, 1935, in a Fort Worth railyard while posing as a hobo. Hamilton had sent a note to his sister in Dallas, which was intercepted by Dallas deputy Bill Decker. Decker and four more deputies drove to Fort Worth and enlisted the help of Fort Worth detective Chester Reagan and Tarrant County deputy sheriff Carl Harmon.

The group canvassed the railyard and came upon Hamilton around 50 feet north of the East First Street overpass, "sprawled on the tracks" with six or seven hobos nearby. When arrested, he was wearing dirty overalls and had two .45s on him plus a suitcase full of new clothing beside him. Decker approached Hamilton with gun in hand and said, "Host em up Ray, before I cut you in two". Hamilton surrendered and was taken to Dallas. The next day over 500 curiosity seekers flooded the courthouse to see the Public Enemy Number One.

== Death ==
Hamilton was convicted of his role in the murder of M.J. Crowson and sentenced to death. He was executed on May 10, 1935, at the Texas State Penitentiary in Huntsville, by electric chair. Hamilton walked calmly and firmly to the chair and seated himself with the words, "Well, goodbye all." He was preceded in the electric chair by Joe Palmer. Palmer had agreed to go first to give Hamilton time to compose himself. Hamilton was executed eleven days before his twenty-first birthday.

Raymond Hamilton never publicly admitted killing anyone, but he had told his brother, Floyd, that he was not so sure about the killing of undersheriff Eugene Moore on August 5, 1932, in Stringtown, Oklahoma. "Clyde and I were both shooting," Raymond told Floyd, "It could have been either one of us, or both." Raymond Hamilton was convicted of the murder of John Bucher of Hillsboro, Texas on May 1, 1932, though he had nothing to do with it. The actual killer was Ted Rogers with Clyde Barrow and Johnny Russell as accomplices.

== Bibliography ==
- UNDERWOOD, SID. Depression Desperado: The Chronicle of Raymond Hamilton. Eakin Press, United States, (1995). 242 pages. ISBN 9780890159668.
- BLANCHE CALDWELL BARROW and JOHN NEAL PHILLIPS. My Life with Bonnie and Clyde. USA. University of Oklahoma Press; Illustrated edición, (2005). 376 pages. ISBN 9780806137155
- ROBIN COLE-JETT. Lewisville. Arcadia Publishing Library Editions (2011) . 130 pages. ISBN 978-1531652821.
- BURROUGH, BRYAN. Public Enemies: America's Greatest Crime Wave and the Birth of the FBI, 1933-34. Reprint edición. Penguin Books; Media Tie In (2005). 624 pages. ISBN 9780143035374
