= 20th Writers Guild of America Awards =

20th WGA Awards
- Date: March 22, 1968
- Organized by: Writers Guild of America, East and the Writers Guild of America, West

The 20th Writers Guild of America Awards honored the best film writers and television writers of 1967. Winners were announced in 1968.

== Winners and nominees ==
=== Film ===
Winners are listed first highlighted in boldface.

**Best Written Musical**: **Thoroughly Modern Millie, Written by Richard Morris**; Camelot, Screenplay by Alan Jay Lerner; Based on the musical by Alan Jay Lerner and the novel The Once and Future King by T.H. White; Doctor Dolittle, Screenplay by Leslie Bricusse; Based on the novels by Hugh Lofting; How to Succeed in Business Without Really Trying, Screenplay by David Swift; Based on the novel by Shepherd Mead and the books by Abe Burrows, Jack Weinstock and Willie Gilbert	**Best Written American Drama**: **Bonnie and Clyde, Written by Robert Benton and David Newman**; Guess Who's Coming to Dinner, Written by William Rose; In Cold Blood, Screenplay by Richard Brooks; Based on the novel by Truman Capote; In the Heat of the Night, Screenplay by Stirling Silliphant; Based on the novel by John Ball; Up the Down Staircase, Screenplay by Tad Mosel; Based on the novel by Bel Kaufman
**Best Written American Comedy**: **The Graduate, Screenplay by Buck Henry and Calder Willingham; Based on the novel by Charles Webb**; Barefoot in the Park, Screenplay by Neil Simon; Based on his play; Divorce American Style, Screenplay by Norman Lear; Story by Robert Kaufman; The Flim-Flam Man, Screenplay by William Rose; Based on the novel by Guy Owen; A Guide for the Married Man, Screenplay by Frank Tarloff; Based on the book by Frank Tarloff	**Best Written American Original Screenplay**: **Bonnie and Clyde, Written by Robert Benton and David Newman**; Guess Who's Coming to Dinner, Written by William Rose; The President's Analyst, Written by Theodore J. Flicker

=== Television ===
**Episodic Comedy**: **"The Honeymooners: Movies Are Better Than Ever" – The Jackie Gleason Show (CBS) – Marvin Marx, Walter Stone and Rod Parker**; "Where-What-How-Who Am I?" – Get Smart (CBS) – Barry E. Blitzer, and Ray Brenner; "Bronzefinger" – Get Smart (CBS) – Lila Garrett and Bernie Kahn; "Rain, Snow and Rice" – That Girl (ABC) – James L. Brooks	**Episodic Drama**: **"The City on the Edge of Forever" – Star Trek (NBC) – Harlan Ellison**; "Fandango" – Gunsmoke (CBS) – Don Ingalls; "Odds on Evil" – Mission: Impossible (CBS) – William Read Woodfield and Allan Balter; "The Return of the Archons" – Star Trek (NBC) – Boris Sobelman (teleplay) and Gene Roddenberry (story); "The Martyr" – The Big Valley (ABC) – Mel Goldberg
**Best Written Dramatic Anthology**: **Noon Wine – Sam Peckinpah**

=== Special awards ===
Laurel Award for Screenwriting Achievement

**Casey Robinson**

Valentine Davies Award

**George Seaton**
