= The Organization (film) =

1971 film by Don Medford

- Theatrical release poster
- Directed by: Don Medford
- Written by: James R. Webb
- Based on: Characters by John Ball
- Produced by: Walter Mirisch
- Starring: Sidney Poitier; Barbara McNair; Gerald S. O'Loughlin
- Cinematography: Joseph Biroc
- Edited by: Ferris Webster
- Music by: Gil Melle
- Production company: The Mirisch Corporation
- Distributed by: United Artists
- Release date: October 20, 1971
- Running time: 106 minutes
- Country: United States
- Language: English

The Organization is a 1971 American crime thriller film starring Sidney Poitier and directed by Don Medford. It was the last of the trilogy featuring the police detective Virgil Tibbs that had begun with In the Heat of the Night (1967), followed by They Call Me Mister Tibbs! (1970). In The Organization, Tibbs is called in to hunt down a gang of urban revolutionaries, suspected of a series of crimes. The screenplay was penned by James R. Webb, and the film co-stars Barbara McNair, Gerald S. O'Laughlin, Sheree North and Raul Julia.

== Plot ==
After a break-in at the San Francisco headquarters of a company, the police are called in. One of the executives has been murdered, and the security guard has been bludgeoned. It is not a simple robbery, as the executive was killed by shots from two different guns, nothing was stolen, and there are several other unexplained facts.

Virgil Tibbs (Poitier) is contacted by the group which committed the break-in and stole four million dollars' worth of heroin. They are urban revolutionaries who explain that the company is a front for drug-dealing. They had hoped the break-in would lead the police to investigate the company itself and want to use the heroin to get to the leaders of the organization. Tibbs arrests the security guard to question him, but the guard is murdered while sitting in the police car.

Tibbs agrees to help the group if they co-operate with him. One member of the group is hunted down and beaten by the drug pushers and another is murdered. Tibbs himself comes under suspicion from his superiors when the narcotics division tie him to the stolen drugs, whereupon he is removed from the case and suspended.

He persuades one of his colleagues to help him with information on the bogus company behind the drug traffic. One of the revolutionaries, Juan, contacts the drug dealers and offers them the drugs back for $500,000. He sets it up smartly, proposing to exchange the first half of the drugs for half the money, using identical suitcases in a very busy square.

Once the exchange takes place one of the other revolutionaries 'robs' the suitcase containing the money. The drug dealer shoots a policeman and tries to get away but is tackled by Juan and arrested. Juan notes the license plate on the car of the criminal executive who had come to supervise the deal. The revolutionary escapes with money, pursued by some of the gang through the construction site for the unfinished Montgomery Street Station.

Tibbs goes to the house of the wife of the security guard. When Tibbs' colleague arrives, Tibbs confronts the wife, accuses her of being a runner for the gang, shows heroin in a package she has just brought home, and tells her she can choose between prison or being killed by the mob like her husband. She gives in and identifies the two chiefs of the organization.

The chiefs are arrested by a large group of police officers, including Tibbs. When they are taken to the police car, a mob hit-man takes them out before they can talk. Tibbs now sees that he won a battle but is losing a war.

== Cast ==
- Sidney Poitier as Lieutenant Virgil Tibbs
- Barbara McNair as Valerie Tibbs
- Gerald S. O'Loughlin as Lieutenant Pecora
- Sheree North as Mrs. Morgan
- Fred Beir as Bob Alford
- Raúl Juliá as Juan
- James A. Watson Jr. as Stacy Baker
- Billy Green Bush as Dave Thomas
- Ron O'Neal as Joe Peralez
- Lani Miyazaki as Annie Sekido
- Demond Wilson as Charlie Blossom
- Bernie Hamilton as Lieutenant Jessop
- Daniel J. Travanti as Sergeant Chassman
- Garry Walberg as Captain Stacy
- John Lasell as Zach Mills
- Max Gail as Rudy
- Ross Hagen as Chet
- Paul Jenkins as Tony
- Allen Garfield as Benjamin "Benjy"
- Graham Jarvis as William Martin
- Johnny Haymer as John Bishop
- Charles H. Gray as Night Watchman
- Richard C. Adams as Dan
- Jarion Monroe as Larry French
- George Spell as Andy Tibbs
- Wanda Spell as Ginger Tibbs
- Oscar Beregi Jr. as Andre, Drug Lord (uncredited)
- John Alvin as Forensic Officer (uncredited)
- Mark Tapscott as Captain Grayson (uncredited)
- Ganga Narayana Das as Hare Krishna (uncredited)

== Release on DVD and HD ==
The Organization was released on Region One DVD in 2001 and in Region Two in 2003. In 2010 it was digitized in High Definition (1080i) and broadcast on MGM HD.

Kino Lorber released the film alongside They Call Me Mr. Tibbs on May 12, 2015, on Blu-ray. The two-disc Ultra HD release of In the Heat of the Night, also from Kino, included both sequels as one of the extras in the Blu-ray disc unlike the previous Blu-ray releases where they were sold separately.

== Reception ==
=== Critical response ===
The film received largely poor reviews from critics. Roger Ebert gave it two stars, stating that "the plot is not exactly believable", while A.H. Weiler in The New York Times wrote "The Organization can be rough on super-city sleuths as well as movie-goers who've been through much the same melodramatics before".

=== Box office ===
The film opened in 18 cities in the United States and Canada and was number one at the US box office for the week. It grossed $1,260,233 in its first 12 days.

== See also ==
- List of American films of 1971
- List of hood films
