= In the Heat of the Night (TV series) =

1988 American crime drama series

- Foreground: Carroll O'Connor; left middle: Howard Rollins; back row left to right: Hugh O'Connor; David Hart; Geoffrey Thorne; Alan Autry (Season 2)
- Genre: Police procedural; Crime drama; Mystery
- Based on: Characters created by John Ball
- Developed by: James Lee Barrett
- Starring: Carroll O'Connor; Howard Rollins; Alan Autry; Anne-Marie Johnson; David Hart; Christian LeBlanc; Lois Nettleton; Geoffrey Thorne; Hugh O'Connor; Carl Weathers; Crystal R. Fox; Denise Nicholas; Randall Franks
- Theme music composer: Quincy Jones (music), Alan and Marilyn Bergman (lyrics); Christopher Page (arranger)
- Opening theme: "In the Heat of the Night" performed by Bill Champlin
- Ending theme: "In the Heat of the Night" (instrumental; excluding the pilot)
- Country of origin: United States
- Original language: English
- No. of seasons: 7
- No. of episodes: 142 + 4 TV movies (list of episodes)

Production
- Executive producers: Fred Silverman; Juanita Bartlett; David Moessinger; Carroll O'Connor
- Running time: 44–48 minutes (without commercials)
- Production companies: The Fred Silverman Company; Juanita Bartlett Productions; MGM/UA Television Productions; MGM Television

Original release
- Network: NBC
- Release: March 6, 1988 – May 19, 1992
- Network: CBS
- Release: October 28, 1992 – May 16, 1995

In the Heat of the Night is an American police procedural crime drama television broadcast 1988 to 1995, starring Carroll O'Connor and Howard Rollins.

It was loosely based on the 1967 film of the same title directed by Norman Jewison, starring Sidney Poitier and Rod Steiger and was in turn inspired by the 1965 novel by John Ball.

The TV series starred O'Connor as Southern police chief William "Bill" Gillespie and Rollins as Philadelphia police detective Virgil Tibbs. The series was broadcast on NBC from March 6, 1988, to May 19, 1992, then it moved to CBS from October 28, 1992 to May 16, 1995. Its executive producers were O'Connor, Fred Silverman and Juanita Bartlett.

This series marked O'Connor's return to a series for the first time since the All in the Family spin-off Archie Bunker's Place ended in 1983.

== Premise ==
Set in the late 1980s–1990s, the series acts as a sequel to the 1967 film but with a floating timeline. It carried over three core characters — Virgil Tibbs, Chief Gillespie, and Courtney (renamed Parker) — and relied on the movie's fame to set the foundation. The show gained acclaim for the chemistry between its leads, engaging crime plots, and relevant social commentary.

To develop it as a weekly series, there were obvious changes that would have to justify Virgil Tibbs returning to Sparta, a racially divided small town in Mississippi. In the film, Tibbs was a police detective from Philadelphia who became embroiled in a murder investigation while passing through town. For the series, he becomes a Sparta native who moved North after high school, became a police officer, got married, and returned to his hometown — which he now views as backwards and slow. In the film, Gillespie was unmarried. The series establishes him as a World War II veteran and widower who tragically lost his Italian war bride and infant son during childbirth decades earlier.

=== Pilot ===
In the pilot episode, Philadelphia detective Virgil Tibbs returns home to Sparta, Mississippi, for his mother's funeral. Mayor James Findlay successfully convinces him to accept the newly created position of Chief of Detectives for the city of Sparta. This initiative is motivated by the need to modernize and integrate a police department that has a history of racial tensions with the community and insufficient training, as well as by Findlay's personal ambition to advance his congressional campaign. The blustery older "good old boy", police Chief Bill Gillespie, who knows Tibbs from a prior murder investigation, resents the appointment, suspecting it is a political maneuver to replace him.

Mayor Findlay hires Tibbs for his stellar reputation, lacking confidence in Chief Gillespie to solve the murder of a local young woman. The duo reluctantly team up after an innocent Black suspect is framed and found lynched in his cell — a death Gillespie quickly dismisses as suicide, but Tibbs is not satisfied and investigates further. Together, they trace both murders back to the spoiled and entitled son of a wealthy local cotton mill owner whose father had been covering for his son's misdeeds nearly all of his life, as well as being behind violent attacks on Tibbs. Despite early friction stemming from racial conflicts, limited resources, and Tibbs’ occasional condescension toward his hometown, the two men proved to be highly effective collaborators, eventually forging a close, almost familial bond.

=== Themes ===
For a small town, Sparta certainly had its share of controversies, malefactions and corruption. The show dealt with a variety of relevant issues over the seasons, topics some other dramas purposely avoided, including racism, police brutality, interracial relationships, rape, poverty, hate crimes, drug trafficking, drug addiction, teen pregnancy, adultery, alcoholism, AIDS, environmental crimes, abortion, incest, child abuse, sexual harassment, illegal immigration, euthanasia, anti-Semitism, labor strikes, political corruption, prostitution, domestic violence, mental disorders, dysfunctional families, suicide, capital punishment, and drunk driving.

== Broadcast history ==
The series debuted as a midseason replacement for the NBC series J.J. Starbuck, premiering on Sunday, March 6, 1988, before moving into its regular time slot on Tuesday nights. The series ran on the network until May 19, 1992, when it moved to CBS and aired until May 16, 1995.

Season	Time	Rank	Rating	Viewers
Season 1 1987–88	Tuesday at 9:00–10:00 PM on NBC	19	17.0	15,639,200
Season 2 1988–89	Tuesday at 9:00–10:00 PM on NBC	18	17.3	15,564,900
Season 3 1989–90	Tuesday at 9:00–10:00 PM on NBC	19	16.9	13,871,900
Season 4 1990–91	Tuesday at 9:00–10:00 PM on NBC	21	14.9 (tied with Major Dad)	—N/a
Season 5 1991–92	Tuesday at 9:00–10:00 PM on NBC (October 1, 1991 – January 7, 1992); Tuesday at 8:00–9:00 PM on NBC (January 14 – May 19, 1992)	30	13.1 (tied with The Golden Girls)	—N/a
Season 6 1992–93	Wednesday at 9:00–10:00 PM on CBS	46	—N/a	10,630,000
Season 7 1993–94	Thursday at 8:00–9:00 PM on CBS (September 16, 1993 – January 6, 1994); Wednesday at 9:00–10:00 PM on CBS (January 12 – May 11, 1994)	—N/a	—N/a	—N/a

== Seasons overview ==
Season	Episodes	Originally released			Rank	Rating
Season	Episodes	First released	Last released	Network	Rank	Rating
1	8	March 6, 1988	May 3, 1988	NBC	19	17.0
2	22	December 4, 1988	May 16, 1989	NBC	19	17.3
3	22	October 24, 1989	May 8, 1990	NBC	17	17.3
4	22	September 18, 1990	April 30, 1991	NBC	19	15.2
5	22	October 1, 1991	May 19, 1992	NBC	30	13.1
6	22	October 28, 1992	May 12, 1993	CBS	37	11.9
7	24	September 16, 1993	May 11, 1994	CBS	63	10.3
TV films	4	October 21, 1994	May 16, 1995	CBS	—N/a	—N/a

=== First season, 1988 ===
The first season was filmed on location in Hammond, Louisiana. Hammond was selected by James Lee Barrett, who wrote the pilot and was also the executive consultant for the show, to represent the small southern town of Sparta, Mississippi. The producers had difficulty finding usable filming locations, because other, more modern structures were close enough to be picked up in the images. Eight episodes were filmed—the two-hour pilot movie and six regular one-hour episodes. The series premiered on March 6, 1988, with the season finale airing on May 3.

Many conflicts arose between Juanita Bartlett and Carroll O'Connor over the writing of the series. At first, Bartlett allowed O'Connor to consult on the series per his contract. After the pilot, however, she ordered scripts from her writers. O'Connor described these as "recycled material from other crime shows". He was disappointed in the scripts, feeling that the writers were taking big-city stories and imposing them on a small town. He believed that the key to this show's success was to express its small-town locale and characters through the stories. Scripts would be given to him marked "FINAL: NO REWRITES", but O'Connor often rewrote scripts anyway, angering the production staff members, who felt they were burning up fax machines with the changes. O'Connor described Bartlett as a very arrogant person. If the show was going to be renewed, then O'Connor was not interested and threatened to quit the show unless the writing improved and Bartlett was replaced as executive producer. The early episodes were gritty, raw and considered groundbreaking for that time. There was an emphasis on grisly murders or other crimes, rather than the lives of the New South-era characters, for which the series later became known.

=== Second season, 1988–1989 ===
Strong first-season ratings earned the show a fall renewal on NBC, though Season 2's premiere was delayed to December 4, 1988, due to the five-month-long Writers Guild of America strike. The second season brought a revamped look, cast updates, new executive producers, Jeri Taylor and her husband David Moessinger, and a permanent shift in production from Hammond, Louisiana, to Covington, Georgia, which remained as the primary filming location of the show for the duration of the series.

The season premiere was aired as a two-hour TV movie originally entitled "The Case of the Voodoo Murders", now known in syndication as "Don't Look Back". The plot revolved around a bizarre copycat murder of one that Gillespie had investigated 20 years earlier, and he himself is also one of the targets for the unknown killer. Meanwhile, the Sparta city council was encouraging Virgil Tibbs to run for Chief of Police as a potential replacement for Gillespie—a position Virgil had little interest in pursuing. Nevertheless, rumors began circulating that Tibbs was actively gunning for the job, worsening the friction between the two men. Compounded by Gillespie’s anxiety over his advancing age, failing health, and the resistance to the idea of retirement, the rising tension culminated in a heated confrontation with Virgil. Tibbs also found himself clashing with Parker and Bubba, further straining an already hostile work environment. On the home front, Althea Tibbs, who had been a homemaker in the first season, accepted an offer from Councilman Ted Marcus (Thom Gossom Jr.) to serve as a teacher and guidance counselor at Sparta High School.

Gone was Christian LeBlanc, who portrayed Officer Junior Abernathy in the first season and in his place, Hugh O'Connor's smaller role as Officer Lonnie Jamison was expanded. Added were two new regular characters—Joanne St. John (Lois Nettleton), the chief's sometime girlfriend and owner of the local diner, The Magnolia Cafe; and a cocky, ambitious young rookie officer, Willson Sweet (an eighteen-year-old Geoffrey Thorne), fresh out of the police academy and the second black officer hired to serve on Sparta's police force.

The season also introduced the first of several new recurring characters, including general practitioner / county coroner Dr. Frank Robb (Dan Biggers). "The Creek" saw the introduction of the second prominent Georgia performer to claim a regular role on the series, Officer Randy Goode (1988-1993) played by Randall Franks, who was cast following the show's move to Covington. "Gunshot", where Virgil experiences guilt and mental distress after he shoots and kills a seemingly unarmed female robbery suspect, introduces a character with a criminal past who later becomes invaluable as an informant to Gillespie and the Sparta P. D., Jimmy Dawes (Afemo Omilami).

Other plots in this season included a minister promoting the racial integration of his church congregation suddenly ends up dead; Bubba accused of rape; Virgil has in-law blues when Althea's parents come to visit. Gillespie's girlfriend Joanne has a mysterious connection to an escaped felon; and Gillespie witnessing the execution of a now remorseful man (Paul Benjamin) whom he arrested years ago for his role in a bank robbery where two people were killed, a compelling episode that O'Connor wrote himself under the pseudonym Matt Harris ("A Trip Upstate").

==== Carroll O’Connor’s heart surgery ====
During the filming of the episode "Walkout" in early 1989, O'Connor began to experience fatigue. After a medical examination, it was discovered that he needed sextuple heart bypass surgery. The operation was scheduled almost immediately. For the final four episodes of the season—"Fifteen Forever," "Ladybug, Ladybug," "The Pig Woman of Sparta," and "Missing"— Joe Don Baker joined the cast as retired police captain Tom Dugan, a temporary substitute for Chief Gillespie (who was away at a Quantico training conference, aside from a brief appearance in "Missing"). Appointed acting chief by Councilwoman White, Dugan was secretly an FBI informant working undercover for two purposes: to rescue his teenage godson from a white supremacist group, and to prevent the group from assassinating a civil rights leader during an upcoming Sparta visit—a secret fully uncovered in the Season 3 episode "Anniversary."

In the season finale "Missing," masked men kidnap the chief from his home upon his return to Sparta, prompting a joint police and FBI manhunt. Virgil and Bubba initially suspect Dugan is involved, but find out otherwise; he is subsequently murdered. It is later revealed that Gillespie's kidnapping and Dugan's slaying was orchestrated by that same white supremacist group. Behind the scenes, O'Connor wanted a heart surgery storyline for Gillespie that mirrored his own personal experience, but with him being indisposed, Taylor and Moessinger opted for the Quantico/kidnapping plot instead and also killed off Dugan, a decision O'Connor strongly disliked.

Although the ratings that season were impressive and would turn out to be the highest of the show's run, all was not well. The season finale did not sit well with O'Connor and it was the final straw in a long line of complaints against Taylor and Moessinger, who were fired at the end of the season. O'Connor then became one of the executive producers for the duration of the series. When Taylor and Moessinger decided to do the show, Taylor was quoted, "I was one of those in the '60s that was out marching for civil rights...I was one of those who thought the major work had all been done. When we decided to do the show, we took research trips to the South and we saw that there had been an enormous amount of change. We came back with a renewed vigor but also with the realization that there is still a lot more to be done. There is still deeply entrenched racism. And addressing that became a much larger element in our thinking about the show."

Moessinger was quoted, "What makes race relations a constant in our show is the two lead characters—one is white and one is black. Whether they are angry at each other, whether they're happy or sad, we're showing the interaction of two men who are trying to do the best in life. If we never put one race issue into it, if we never said one word about it, the message is there because it's showing how people ought to interrelate, how they ought to work together, how they ought to get along."

=== Third season, 1989–1990 ===
Season 3 premiered October 24, 1989 and by this time, O'Connor had taken complete control of the show as a scriptwriter and executive producer after firing Taylor and Moessinger. From that point on, he brought aboard writers and showrunners who shared his vision of where he wanted the series to go.

Althea Tibbs deals with the effects and aftermath of rape in the explosive season premiere. Upon returning home from the grocery store one afternoon after school, she is ambushed and sexually assaulted in her kitchen by Sparta High School's new music teacher, Stephen Ainslee (Ken Marshall). Althea’s relationship with him was tense from the outset due to his defiance of her authority, a conflict that ultimately culminated in the attack. The episode follows the Tibbs family and the Sparta police as they face frustrating roadblocks in their pursuit of justice, largely due to Ainslee's wife. Althea finds herself grappling with the profound and lasting emotional repercussions stemming from the event, while Virgil’s sense of simmering anger and intense exasperation finally reaches a critical breaking point.

The second part of the Season 2 finale, "Missing", is resumed in the third season's sixth episode, "Anniversary", where the Chief is freed by his captors after Dugan's murder; he recounts his experience after returning to Sparta and the story continues from there. It was supposed to be the original Season 3 premiere—the decision made by O'Connor to delay it displeased NBC because those episodes were not shown in chronological order. With the displacement of the episodes, it took longer for the audience to find out what the outcome of the finale was, or wondering if it was going to be addressed at all. O'Connor selected the "Rape" episode to kick off Season 3 instead because he felt it was more powerful and would attract higher ratings.

"Crackdown" plunges Sparta into a nightmare as the crack cocaine epidemic takes hold of its youth. Chief Gillespie stubbornly dismisses the crisis as a big city problem, turning a blind eye to the reality on his doorstep. Driven by desperation to save a 13-year-old addict, Officer Sweet risks everything—defying Gillespie's direct orders and putting his own career on the line in a heartbreaking battle for a child's life. A young Vietnamese refugee arrives in town right before Christmas, claiming to be the son of a Sparta resident who was killed during the war. Bubba becomes a target of a backwoods family after he shoots and kills one of their brothers while they are robbing a store. Parker is upset when a woman he's interested in is a suspect in the death of a private investigator from New York who comes to Sparta looking for her.

In "First Girl," Chief Gillespie hires Sparta's first Black policewoman, Christine "Chris" Rankin, who is killed on her first day during a shootout with a suspect. Stricken with sorrow and guilt, Gillespie is suspended pending a city council investigation, driving him to hunt down her killer himself. Rankin is replaced by Officer LuAnn Corbin (Crystal R. Fox), a recurring character who eventually became part of the main cast and paved the way for additional female officers on the force, such as Officer Dee Shepard (Dee Shaw).

To make room for Harriet DeLong (Denise Nicholas) as Chief Gillespie's future love interest and a close friend and confidante of Virgil’s, the character of Joanne St. John was eliminated. Introduced in "First Girl" as an outspoken, college-educated city council member who is critical of the police, Harriet—a much younger, attractive African-American divorcée—initially clashed with Gillespie numerous times as a recurring presence and, by Season 6, a main cast member.

In the two-part season finale "Citizen Trundel" (written by O'Connor, Cynthia Deming, and William J. Royce), Harriet DeLong's younger sister, Natalie, is murdered on orders from V. J. "Vidge" Trundel—a wealthy, married white businessman and the secret father of Natalie's nine-year-old son. Harriet's grief turns to rage when Chief Gillespie hesitates to target the powerful and seemingly untouchable Trundel out of fear for his own career. Although accomplices are eventually arrested, Harriet's primary goal is the mogul himself. Ultimately, Trundel faces a reckoning—though in a completely unexpected way. The epilogue to this arc concludes in Season 5's "Trundel's Will Be Done."

These are the first episodes in which we see Bill and Harriet begin to form a connection beyond them always being in disagreement—he sees beyond her hardened exterior and finds a sensitive and a vulnerable woman, and she discovers his compassionate and protective nature. Their growing camaraderie blossoms into a central, slow-burning romance in later seasons, despite NBC's initial pressure to keep their relationship strictly platonic.

Art imitated life for Denise Nicholas, as her real-life sister had been slain a decade earlier and the culprit had never been caught. When O'Connor approached Nicholas about the topic of these episodes, she was stunned. It had upset her greatly and she had to write him a note explaining the situation, as he was unaware of the circumstances. He offered to have her not appear in the episodes, but she chose to do so to bring closure for her and her family. She was able to channel her unresolved grief into the role. Only O'Connor and director Leo Penn knew the truth during filming.

==== Rollins' substance abuse problems ====
During the back half of Season 3, Howard Rollins took six weeks off when he entered a drug and alcohol rehab program to battle his addiction issues. He missed five episodes: "King's Ransom", "Triangle", "Hello In There", "December Days" and "An Angry Woman". MGM worked around his rehab schedule. Episodes were not necessarily aired in the order they were filmed, which explains why Tibbs was present one week and not the next. To explain Rollins' absence, Tibbs was said to be in New Orleans working with the FBI. Rollins, who was suffering from depression, considered suicide shortly before Christmas 1989, prompting his stay in rehab. He was able to return full time for the last several episodes of the season. O'Connor threatened to sue a tabloid which published a story saying that MGM and O'Connor had fired Rollins for being absent from the set due to his problems, which was untrue. Having been very close to Rollins, O'Connor was resolved to stand by him as much as he could. Nicholas said, "Carroll set the standard for loyalty. If he liked you, he really liked you and would be there for you."

=== Fourth season, 1990–1991 ===
Cynthia Deming and William J. Royce were promoted to main story editors. The season opens with a two-part episode entitled "Brotherly Love", which storyline hints at a similar theme as a Clint Eastwood film, Magnum Force, and the birth of Virgil and Althea's twins, William and Sarah. Althea had revealed her pregnancy at the end of the third season.

While Althea awaits labor, Virgil Tibbs travels to Philadelphia for a friend and former fellow officer's funeral—initially reported as a suicide. Investigating further, Tibbs uncovers that his friend was framed for a drug dealer's murder and targeted by a corrupt Internal Affairs ring execution-style killing criminals cleared on technicalities. When Virgil is arrested and framed for murder himself while trying to expose the rogue police network, Chief Gillespie journeys north to bail him out, uncover the truth, and clear his name. They solve the mystery of what happened to Virgil's friend and get justice for him. Together, they are able to bring the corrupt officers down, allowing Tibbs to return home to Sparta just in time for the birth of his twins, William and Sarah, on September 18, 1990, after which his aunt Etta Kibby moves in to assist with the newborns.

Other stories include a quiet and unassuming teacher wrongfully accused of the molestation of a student, which ends with tragic consequences. Virgil's younger cousin is the prime suspect in a rash of burglaries that go terribly wrong, and jeopardizes Virgil's attempts to reunite his extended family. Gillespie and Harriet's growing friendship gets complicated once her ex-husband Vic Glendon returns to Sparta and is arrested for his participation in a robbery with two other men that resulted in murder; Harriet's teenage son Eugene is somehow involved out of loyalty to his father, and his dislike for the chief doesn't make things any easier. (This storyline continues towards the end of the season with Glendon's trial, where he is found guilty of first degree murder and receives a death penalty sentence.)

Sweet is devastated after his elderly friend is found by her husband murdered in her bookstore; Parker falls for a blind woman who is the only 'ear'-witness to the disappearance and eventual murder of her next door neighbor. Gillespie becomes the guardian of a pre-teen black boy whose family is torn apart by death, drugs and prison. Bubba going to Los Angeles to extradite a Sparta resident for arson where two people died was the first of two backdoor pilots for spinoffs that would star Alan Autry, but neither were picked up by the network.

The season closes out as Virgil's line of work as a police officer becomes increasingly more minacious. After witnessing the fallout from a brutal gunfight, Althea is worried for her spouse, that he won't be around for their kids. She asks Virgil to consider a career change, one less dangerous. That turns out to be something he had in mind as well — the following season he becomes a law student on a compressed schedule while still retaining his rank as Captain on the Sparta police force, but now the focus is upon becoming an attorney.

=== Fifth season, 1991–1992 ===
The fifth season opens with a major retcon revealing that Chief Gillespie has a 19-year-old daughter named Lana (Christine Elise), who is unaware of whom her biological father is, and Gillespie has never met her. Lana was conceived during his past affair with her free-spirited and indiscriminate mother, Georgia Farren (Stella Stevens). When Georgia returns to town to settle a property dispute, a still-smitten Gillespie eagerly assists her, but their reunion triggers deadly danger: Georgia’s long-separated husband, Ken—whom she never officially divorced—has harbored a deep grudge over the affair ever since and is determined to exact fatal revenge on both Gillespie and Georgia.

Over the course of the previous season, the respectful professional relationship between Chief Gillespie and Harriet DeLong—which had initially started out acrimonious—gradually evolved into a close, mutual friendship. This dynamic shifts dramatically in the episode "The More Things Change," when Gillespie reveals his true feelings to Harriet and kisses her after driving her home from a dance. Though their attraction is mutual, an interracial May–December romance would face major backlash in conservative Sparta. The hostility would extend far beyond their age gap; public exposure could possibly cost them their hard-earned positions in the town. Off-screen, the romantic pairing resonated deeply with the majority of the viewing audience, though it also provoked vocal objections from a segment of viewers who sent critical fan mail directly to the actors.

NBC network executives also were nervous that a Gillespie / DeLong love affair would hurt ratings, especially among those viewers in the South, and tried to talk O'Connor out of it. However, he was adamant and would not budge. He was willing to put his own reputation on the line and push past the boundaries that most other television shows shied away from. The interracial romance was something he had advocated hard for against the network, and won.

Other storylines include D. A. Darnelle's daughter being kidnapped; Virgil's estranged Aunt Ruda is the only witness who can clear Bubba's name in a police shooting; Sweet's quest to discover the truth about the racially motivated murder of his grandfather in 1948 and those responsible for it (a story loosely based on the murder of civil rights activist Medgar Evers, "Sweet, Sweet Blues") and racists sabotaging a celebration honoring a Sparta civil rights pioneer in "Odessa", the first of six episodes written by Denise Nicholas. Playing Harriet was a role she enjoyed and was proud of, yet she couldn't ignore the disparity behind the scenes: despite its focus on telling Black stories, the show did not have a single Black writer on staff. She raised the issue with O'Connor, who acknowledged her point and invited her to pitch an episode idea. She suggested a story about the first black woman in Sparta who tried to register to vote in the 1960s—and O'Connor was so impressed with it that he assisted her in constructing it and encouraged her to contribute further pieces to the series.

In the two-part season finale "Sanctuary" and "The Law on Trial", an angry Sheriff McComb has Gillespie, Tibbs and a priest, Father Antonio DeMarco (Cesare Danova), charged with obstruction of justice and harboring a fugitive after an escaped prisoner—a Salvadoran immigrant seeking asylum but is scheduled for deportation—is given sanctuary in a monastery and Gillespie and Tibbs don't arrest him when he refuses to give himself up. McComb also threatens to have them both fired from the force, and the Father is also charged with helping the prisoner escape from the monastery when McComb and his deputies go there to take him into custody. The prisoner is later shot and killed in a tense standoff with the sheriff's department. Towards the trial's end, Father DeMarco's heartfelt summation to the jury contributes to the case, at the very least, ending in a mistrial and the district attorney chooses not to retry the case (though that is not disclosed until Season 6).

The conflict between Sheriff McComb and Chief Gillespie lingers throughout the following season, affecting every crossover dealing with subsequent interactions between McComb's deputies and Gillespie's officers. Gillespie continuously tries to smooth things over between them after, but it isn't until near of the end of the next season that the two mend their differences. The episode and the season end with Gillespie and Tibbs awaiting the verdict in their respective residences on the evening the case is given to the jury, uncertain of what their fates will be. Bill and Harriet reconnect and spend the night together for the first time.

At the end of the original and final broadcast episode on NBC, a textual epilogue was shown, stating that since the jury couldn't reach a verdict, a mistrial is declared and the charges against all three men are dropped. (This text is not seen in syndication.) This was done with NBC's presumption that it would also be the series finale, which it wasn't but it was the last Heat episode shown on that network.

=== Sixth season, 1992–1993 ===
At the start of Season 6, In the Heat of the Night moved from NBC to CBS. It was not publicly known when filming for Season 5 ended whether or not the show would continue. Although the series maintained respectable ratings, viewership had declined slightly, leaving it "on the bubble", as NBC planned to shift its focus toward younger, more urban demographics (similar to shows like L.A. Law, The Fresh Prince of Bel-Air and Law & Order), whereas Heat's audience skewed older. Fearing cancellation without a proper finale—while NBC hesitated on renewing the series—producers negotiated with other networks. The network officially canceled the series after confirming rumors of an impending deal with a competitor. CBS initially picked up the show for a limited run of six two-hour movies—a popular format for long-running crime dramas—before expanding the agreement into a full 22-episode order.

The first two episodes of the season see the surreptitious romance between Gillespie and DeLong intensify. They frequently meet in a small apartment that doubles as Harriet's art studio. However, they fall out when Harriet's son, Eugene, who disapproves of his mother's relationship with the police chief, witnesses a violent drive-by shooting involving rival drug dealers that took the life of his best friend. At first, he is unwilling to cooperate with the authorities, but later changes his mind. Eugene's decision to help the police angers Harriet, and she makes the painful choice to put distance between herself and Gillespie for a while.

Other highlights from the season include a faded country music singer (Robert Goulet) who ends up committing murder; Althea is on the brink of a nervous breakdown after witnessing a student's brutal suicide; Gillespie and his estranged daughter Lana Farren reconcile and develop a close relationship; Bubba experiences his own type of fatal attraction when a woman he helped during a carjacking becomes obsessed with him. LuAnn's slacker ex-con brother (Meshach Taylor) comes to town; a law school friend of Virgil's (Jason Beghe) is suspected of being involved in the death of an ex-girlfriend. Sweet is accused of soliciting a bribe from two racist car salesmen during an arrest; a two-part episode directed by Larry Hagman (who was a close friend of Carroll O'Connor's, directed several later season Heat episodes) involves a white supremacist politician whose visit to Sparta has a couple of ulterior motives, including aspirations for a presidential run ("The Leftover Man").

The season ends with a well-known prison bishop working with Eugene in hopes of getting his father Vic's death row conviction commuted, but the bishop becomes a target for someone looking for revenge. Meanwhile, Harriet is conflicted about what her role in all of this is, as she and Gillespie have fallen in love and are considering a possible future together, which sets the tone for the following season. However, she can't ignore Eugene's dissatisfaction over their relationship, which is her main concern. She does, however, agree to see Vic in prison, commits to helping in his defense by hiring an attorney and they part on good terms.

==== Howard Rollins' departure ====
Rollins’ starring role on In the Heat of the Night was downgraded to guest appearances—with Carl Weathers joining the cast in Season 7 in a new role—before Rollins was eventually written out due to his ongoing battle with substance abuse, bouts with depression, a short jail stint, and four DUI traffic violations in the show’s Georgia filming locations (Covington and four surrounding counties) that legally prevented him from working there. Even with Carroll O'Connor's intervention, not much could be done.

Despite pressure from MGM and the network to dismiss Rollins sooner, O'Connor was reluctant to do so and kept in touch with him habitually in hopes he would resolve his personal and legal troubles after Season 6 wrapped in January 1993. Rollins returned for Season 7 briefly, but continued legal predicaments in Georgia and the four county ban ultimately forced his exit.

By the end of Season 6, both Anne-Marie Johnson and Geoffrey Thorne left the series. Johnson felt that her character had gone as far as it could go, so she departed for a starring role on the final season of Fox's sketch comedy series In Living Color. Thorne, whose appearances in episodes had become noticeably less frequent throughout that season, moved on to build a professional career as a graphic novelist, television screenwriter, and producer; the character of Sweet simply vanished from the series without any explanation.

=== Seventh season, 1993–1994 ===
Season 7 opens with a new beginning for all in Sparta. After nearly three decades on the force, Chief Bill Gillespie is forced into involuntary retirement when the city council denies him a new contract—a decision heavily influenced by his now-public romance with Harriet DeLong. Recognizing the ruling as discriminatory, Gillespie decides not to challenge it, opting instead to accept the outcome and move forward with his life. A furious Harriet repeatedly and unsuccessfully demands a council revote on the decision; meanwhile, Gillespie purchases a new home with hopes that she will move in with him. With Virgil Tibbs away on leave to attend law school full-time in Jackson, former Memphis Police Inspector Hampton Forbes (Carl Weathers) debuts in the season premiere as Sparta's first Black police chief.

The transition from Gillespie being in charge to Forbes taking over is slightly uneasy at the very start, but soon things smooth out. Gillespie's final case as Sparta's chief of police is a fatal shooting of a neighbor by a nine year old boy and it must be decided what is to be done with him.

However, Gillespie is soon appointed as the interim Sheriff of Newton County when Nathan McComb suffers a heart attack and is too ill to continue his duties. Gillespie's function was solely to finish out McComb's term. This new appointment for Gillespie angers his enemies on the city council. They want an investigation, which is upsetting and hurtful for Harriet. However, Gillespie and Forbes seem unbothered by the drama and find that they get along and work together well.

Other cases include a nine-year-old girl killed by a young drunk driver, and Sheriff Gillespie tries to protect his daughter, Lana (who makes her final appearance on the series in this episode), from an on-again/off-again boyfriend involved in a Sparta gun-running scheme in "A Love Lost". Forbes balances mentoring a troubled young boxing protégé while managing a visiting fiancée from Memphis who envisions a very different future for them, while Parker’s oddball stepfather Roy Eversole (Pat Hingle, who first appeared in Season 6) returns from Florida with his lady friend Miss Roda (Anne Meara) in a comedic episode. When Sparta’s new synagogue faces relentless vandalism, Gillespie must once again face his bigoted past as the rabbi (Jerry Stiller) bitterly remembers a 1960s police force that let a synagogue arsonist go free. In "Ches and the Grand Lady," Bobby Short reprises his role as blues musician Ches Collins from Season 5's "Sweet, Sweet Blues", who is a close friend of Lonnie Jamison's overbearing great-aunt Cordelia—Jean Simmons in a guest appearance—as a dying Sparta grande dame. Bubba spends time in Atlanta to help his hospitalized nephew recover from a drug overdose; Harriet's son Eugene jeopardizes his parole by trying to help a friend who is an unwilling participant in a convenience store robbery.

After earning his law degree in Jackson, Virgil Tibbs returns to Sparta as an attorney for a three-episode arc, where he is immediately assigned his first case. In "Virgil Tibbs: Attorney at Law," he privately reveals to Gillespie that he and Althea have separated (explaining Anne-Marie Johnson's absence). Traumatized by her experiences in Sparta and disillusioned with the justice system, Althea did not want to return. She moves back to Philadelphia with their twins and rejects reconciliation, despite Virgil's offer to relocate there to preserve their union. Devastated by the end of his marriage, Virgil chooses not to contest the divorce and begins the challenging journey of adapting to life as a single man.

Virgil's storyline wraps up in "Conspiracy of One" (aired February 2, 1994), marking Howard Rollins' final appearance. In his exit, Virgil risks losing his police pension for being two months short of required service time while simultaneously suspecting a male client at the law firm he works for of orchestrating his wife's death in an automobile accident.

Finally, in "Dangerous Engagement", Chief Forbes serves as best man at the wedding of Gillespie and DeLong at the same church involved in the "Sanctuary" case from Season 5 on May 4, 1994, but days before their planned ceremony, a vengeful gunman hunting McComb mistakes Gillespie for the former sheriff and terrorizes the couple.

The season and the TV series wrapped up with a two-hour movie of the week, "Give Me Your Life", guest starring Peter Fonda as Marcantony Appfel, the charismatic leader of a religious cult, the Celestials, in which the sexual abuse of children is rumored to have occurred. The newly married Gillespies go to New Orleans for their honeymoon but as the situation with the Celestials escalates, they soon return to Sparta. The story (by O'Connor and written by Cynthia Deming and William J. Royce) is loosely based on the real-life drama and Waco siege in Texas in 1993 with the cult leader David Koresh and his followers, the Branch Davidians. A series of articles was published in the Waco Tribune-Herald in early 1993 about Koresh being labeled "The Sinful Messiah" and the main topic of the Heat script stemmed from that, prior to the siege taking place.

=== TV movies and Hugh O'Connor's death ===
Four made-for-television movies were produced for CBS in 1994 for the rest of the season, continuing the series. Once released on DVD, these movies were considered the eighth and final season of the show. The movies were:

- A Matter of Justice (October 21, 1994)
- Who Was Geli Bendl? (December 9, 1994)
- By Duty Bound (February 17, 1995)
- Grow Old Along with Me (May 16, 1995)

Howard Rollins was not the only cast member who had struggled with addiction issues. O'Connor's son and Heat cast member Hugh O'Connor died by suicide nearly two months before the fourth film aired, having fought with substance abuse problems since his teen years and had been in and out of rehab numerous times. When the film was broadcast in its original, two-hour format, a black screen was added in between the intro tag and the opening title; it read "In memory of Hugh O'Connor: 1962–1995".

== Cast and characters ==
=== Main ===
- Carroll O'Connor as Chief William O. "Bill" Gillespie
- Howard Rollins as Chief of Detectives/Captain Virgil Tibbs (seasons 1–6; guest season 7)
- Alan Autry as V. L. "Bubba" Skinner
- Anne-Marie Johnson as Althea Tibbs (seasons 1–6)
- David Hart as Parker Williams
- Christian LeBlanc as Junior Abernathy (season 1)
- Lois Nettleton as Joanne St. John (season 2)
- Geoffrey Thorne as Willson Sweet (seasons 2–6)
- Hugh O'Connor as Lonnie Jamison
- Carl Weathers as Chief Hampton Forbes (seasons 7–8)
- Crystal R. Fox as LuAnn Corbin (seasons 3–8)
- Denise Nicholas as Sparta City Councilwoman Harriet DeLong (seasons 3–8)
- Randall Franks as Randy Goode (seasons 2–6)
- C.C. Taylor as Charlie Peake (seasons 3–8)
- Dee Shaw as Dee Shepard (seasons 3–8)
- Harvey E. Lee Jr. as Ken Covey (seasons 6–8)
- Mark Johnson as Luke Everett (seasons 6–8)

=== Recurring ===
- Thom Gossom Jr. as Sparta City Councilman Ted Marcus (seasons 2–8)
- Tonea Stewart as Etta Kibby (season 4–7)
- Dan Biggers as Dr. Frank "Doc" Robb (seasons 2–8)
- Wilbur Fitzgerald as District Attorney Gerard Darnelle (seasons 3–8)
- Afemo Omilami as Jimmy Dawes (seasons 2–6)
- Rugg Williams as Eugene Glendon (seasons 4–7)
- John Wesley as Vic Glendon (seasons 4–6)
- Fran Bennett as Ruda Gibson (seasons 4–6)
- Christine Elise as Lana Farren (seasons 5–7)
- Ron Culbreth as Sheriff Nathan McComb (seasons 3-7)
- Burgess Meredith as Judge Cully (seasons 6–7)
- Joe Don Baker as retired Captain Tom Dugan (season 2)
- Pat Hingle as Roy Eversole (seasons 6–7)
- Jen Harper as Dr. Winona Day (seasons 5–7)
- Dennis Lipscomb as Mayor Jim Findlay (season 1)
- Bob Penny as Louis Alvin Epp (seasons 3–6)
- Scott Brian Higgs as Randy Calhoun (seasons 3–7)
- Wallace Merck as Earl "Holly" Colmer Sr. (seasons 5–8)
- Karen Carlson as Sarah Hallisey (seasons 5–7)
- Adair Simon as Emily Trundel (seasons 3 & 5)
- Christopher Allport as District Attorney Myron Dutton (season 2)
- Michael Burgess as Tyrell Gibson (seasons 4–6)
- Maureen Dowdell as Tracey Boggs (seasons 5–8)
- Christopher Lobban as Bobby Johnson (seasons 4–7)
- Barbara Lee–Belmonte as Deputy Cristina Surillo (seasons 7–8)

== Writing staff ==
- Carroll O'Connor (1989–1995) as Matt Harris
- Kathy McCormick (1988)
- Mark Rodgers (1989–1990)
- David Moessinger (1988–1989)
- Jeri Taylor (1988–1989)
- Edward Deblasio (1989–1990)
- Nancy Bond (1988–1990)
- William J. Royce (1989–1994)
- Cynthia Deming (1990–1994)
- Robert Bielak (1990–1991)
- Mitch Schneider (1990–1994)
- Joe Gannon (1991–1994)
- Denise Nicholas (1992–1994)
- Terri Erwin (1989–1991)
- Bill Taub (1991)
- Gina Barrett (1993–1994)

== Awards ==
Both Carroll O'Connor and Howard Rollins received awards for their work on the show in 1989. O'Connor received the Primetime Emmy Award for Outstanding Lead Actor in a Drama Series, and was also nominated for the Golden Globe Award for Best Actor – Television Series Drama. O'Connor was also the only male actor who has ever won Emmys for Outstanding Lead Actor in both the comedy (for All in the Family) and drama categories. Howard Rollins' performance on the series earned him the NAACP Image Award for Outstanding Actor in a Drama Series, his second. Anne-Marie Johnson was also nominated for the NAACP Image Award for Outstanding Actress in a Drama Series for her role as Althea Tibbs that year, and also Lois Nettleton was an Emmy nominee for Outstanding Supporting Actress in a Drama Series.

In the Heat of the Night won the NAACP Image Award for Outstanding Drama Series (formally Outstanding Drama Series, Mini-Series or Television Movie), two years in a row, 1992 and 1993. The 1992 win was specifically for the Season 5 episode, "Sweet, Sweet Blues".

== Locations ==
Like the original movie, the television series also took place in a fictionalized version of Sparta, Mississippi. While there is a real Sparta located in Chickasaw County, Mississippi, the version of Sparta shown on television is very different from the real town. For example, the TV Sparta is situated along Interstate 20 in Newton County, while the real town is nowhere near any interstate. During the first season, Hammond, Louisiana was the site of the show's production. In the second season, the show was moved to Georgia, to an area east of Atlanta and it remained there for the rest of its run. The principal area of Sparta was in fact downtown Covington, Georgia. Rural scenes were filmed in a wide surrounding area, in the Georgia counties of Newton (where Covington is located), Rockdale, Walton, Morgan, and Jasper. Decatur in Dekalb County was used as a stand-in for an episode as the Mississippi Capital city of Jackson, and Atlanta itself was used in one episode, in which Bubba worked on a case there. During the series' run, many of the cast members had homes in the area and were often spotted in local restaurants and retail stores. The cast members would also go around to local schools to speak to students.

== Home media and syndication ==
TGG Direct released the first season on DVD in Region 1 on August 30, 2012. The eighth and final season was released on June 11, 2013.

On October 23, 2012, TGG Direct released an 8-disc best-of set entitled In the Heat of the Night – 24hr Television Marathon.

TGG Direct released seasons 4 and 5 onto DVD on December 10, 2013. However, due to licensing issues, the following episodes are missing from the box set: Brotherly Love, Shine On Sparta Moon, Sweet, Sweet Blues, Sanctuary, Law On Trial.

TGG Direct released seasons 2 & 3 in a single boxed set onto DVD on March 11, 2014. However, due to clearance issues, the following episodes are excluded – Season 2 Excluded Episodes: The Family Secret, The Hammer and the Glove, A Trip Upstate, Intruders, Sister Sister, Walkout; Season 3 Excluded Episodes: Fairest of Them All, Crackdown, Anniversary, My Name is Hank, King's Ransom, A Loss of Innocence, Home is Where the Heart Is, Indiscretions, Citizen Trundel Part 1 and Part 2

TGG Direct also released seasons 6 and 7 in individual boxed sets onto DVD on March 11, 2014. However, due to clearance issues, the following episode is excluded from Season 6: Random's Child and the following episodes are excluded from Season 7: Singin' The Blues, Every Man's Family, Maybelle Returns, Ches and the Grand Lady, Dangerous Engagement.

=== Syndication ===
The series entered into syndication in early 1996, after its initial run ended on CBS in May 1995. It was first available to be seen on the Atlanta-based basic cable network TNT from that time on and since then, it has never left the air. The reruns have remained popular over the years, gaining new viewers who didn't watch the series the first time around.

Heat airs in broadcast syndication on Ovation. Ovation airs the show every Monday and Tuesday afternoon for five hours from 2:00 PM ET to 7:00 PM ET back to back. WGN America previously aired the series every weekday morning starting at 11AM ET for 4 hours usually until 3PM ET Monday through Thursday. WGN aired the show Fridays, too, at the same time. Ovation now has moved the show to Monday mornings from 8 AM to 2 PM as part of their "Morning Mysteries" crime and mystery drama block, and Thursdays at 10 PM/9 PM ET/CT (or sometimes 11 PM/10 PM ET/CT.). This TV also aired the show in 2013 until 2020. The show also aired Tuesdays nights at 7PM ET, but was scaled down to just a Thursday airing starting December 7, 2020. MeTV also acquired the rights to the show and it began airing in around either 2018 or 2019, running it every weekday beginning at 11AM ET/10AM CT until 2025. The show previously aired on TNT from 1996 to 2005. The show has remained relatively strong in syndication to this day, particularly airing on some local stations. Bounce TV began airing reruns of the series starting September 13, 2021.

Paid streaming platforms Amazon Prime, MGM+, Apple TV, Philo and other free ad-supported platforms such as Tubi, Plex, The Roku Channel and Pluto TV also show the series on a regular basis or on demand.

== Soundtrack ==
The theme song, "In the Heat of the Night", was originally recorded by Quincy Jones, featuring Ray Charles on vocals and piano for the movie. It is usually paired with "They Call Me Mr. Tibbs" on albums. Bill Champlin of the band Chicago sang the opening theme song for the television series.

The original song itself is supposed to be from Virgil's point of view, being a stranger in a hostile environment. In the case of the TV series, the lyrics refer to both main characters fighting crime in the tiny town of Sparta.

Randall Franks and Alan Autry co-produced the cast CD Christmas Time's A Comin' for Sonlite and MGM/UA, featuring the entire cast and a host of music stars. It was released Christmas 1991 and 1992, and was among the top holiday recordings of those years around the South and Midwest.
