= They Call Me Mister Tibbs! =

1970 film by Gordon Douglas

- Theatrical release poster
- Directed by: Gordon Douglas
- Screenplay by: Alan Trustman; James R. Webb
- Story by: Alan Trustman
- Produced by: Herbert Hirschman
- Starring: Sidney Poitier; Martin Landau; Barbara McNair; Anthony Zerbe
- Cinematography: Gerald Perry Finnerman
- Edited by: Bud Molin; Irving Rosenblum (assistant editor)
- Music by: Quincy Jones
- Production company: Mirisch Productions
- Distributed by: United Artists
- Release date: July 8, 1970
- Running time: 108 minutes
- Country: United States
- Language: English
- Box office: $2,350,000 (US/Canada rentals)

They Call Me Mister Tibbs! is a 1970 American DeLuxe Color crime drama film directed by Gordon Douglas. The second installment in a trilogy, the release was preceded by In the Heat of the Night (1967) and followed by The Organization (1971). The film's title was taken from a line in the first film.

Sidney Poitier reprised his role of police detective Virgil Tibbs, though in this sequel, Tibbs is working for the San Francisco Police rather than the Philadelphia Police (as in the original film) or the Pasadena Police (as in the novels).

== Plot ==
Detective Virgil Tibbs, now a lieutenant with the San Francisco police, is assigned to investigate the murder of a prostitute. A prime suspect is Reverend Logan Sharpe, a street preacher who is leading one of the sides in a city referendum on an urban renewal project. He tells Tibbs he was visiting the prostitute in his professional capacity, to advise her spiritually, and that when he left her apartment, she was alive and healthy.

Tibbs tracks down and questions the janitor from the victim's building, Mealie Williamson, and Woody Garfield, a shady character who owns the building and might have been the dead woman's pimp, who sent the janitor into hiding. Later, suspicion falls on a hood named Rice Weedon, who is pursued and shot by Tibbs in self-defense.

Tibbs’ enquiries lead him to conclude that Sharpe really is the murderer. When confronted, Sharpe confesses; he requests that Tibbs not arrest him for 24 hours, until the polls close on the city referendum. When Tibbs refuses, Sharpe, while being taken away to be arrested, purposely steps in front of a moving vehicle and is killed.

== Cast ==
- Sidney Poitier as Lieutenant Virgil Tibbs
- Martin Landau as Logan Sharpe
- Barbara McNair as Valerie Tibbs
- Anthony Zerbe as Rice Weedon
- Edward Asner as Woody Garfield
- David Sheiner as Lieutenant Kenner
- Jeff Corey as Captain Marden
- Ted Gehring as Sergeant Deutsch
- Juano Hernandez as Mealie Williamson
- Norma Crane as Marge Garfield
- Beverly Todd as "Puff"
- Linda Towne as Joy Sturges
- Garry Walberg as Medical Examiner
- George Spell as Andy Tibbs
- Wanda Spell as Ginger Tibbs
- John Alvin as Bearded Reporter At Logan Sharpe HQ (uncredited)

== Production ==
Quincy Jones wrote the score, as he did with In the Heat of the Night, although the tone of the music in each is markedly different. The previous film, owing to its setting, had a country and bluesy sound, whereas his work for this film was in the funk milieu that would become Jones' trademark in the early 1970s.

The film's title was taken from Virgil's assertive response in In the Heat of the Night after the chief mockingly asked him what people call him in the city where he works.

It was followed by a third film titled The Organization (1971).

The film was the last appearance of veteran actor Juano Hernández, who died in July 1970, a few days after the film premiered.

== Reception ==
The AFI Catalog of Feature Films describes the film as having opened in New York City on July 8, 1970, following lukewarm reviews. Stuart Galbraith IV of DVD Talk described the film as a routine but not-bad cop thriller, writing that Sidney Poitier's performance was very good but that the film was weakened by Gordon Douglas's direction and its subplot about Tibbs's personal life. On Rotten Tomatoes, the film has a 50% rating based on six critic reviews. It did not attract nearly as positive a response as the series' 1967 debut, In the Heat of the Night, which won five Academy Awards including the 1967 Best Picture Oscar.

== Musical score and soundtrack ==
They Call Me Mister Tibbs!

Soundtrack album by Quincy Jones
- Released: 1970
- Recorded: 1970
- Genre: Film score
- Length: 32:49
- Label: United Artists; UAS 5214
- Producer: Quincy Jones

Quincy Jones chronology
Gula Matari (1970)	They Call Me Mister Tibbs! (1970)	$ (1971)

The film score was composed, arranged and conducted by Quincy Jones, and the soundtrack album was released on the United Artists label in 1970.

Professional ratings
Review scores
Source	Rating
Allmusic	3/5 stars

Allmusic's Steven McDonald said "They Call Me Mister Tibbs! had a more open, urban attitude from its San Francisco setting. The music throughout has an edge, with some interesting musical experiments going on ... Jones, as one example, used cimbalom to reflect Tibbs' feelings".

=== Track listing ===
All compositions by Quincy Jones

1. "Call Me Mister Tibbs (Main Title)" − 4:33
2. "'Rev' Logan (Organ Solo)" − 2:12
3. "Blues for Mister Tibbs" − 6:27
4. "Fat Poppadaddy" − 3:28
5. "Soul Flower" − 4:20
6. "Call Me Mister Tibbs (Main Title)" − 2:15
7. "Black Cherry" − 2:15
8. "Family Man" − 1:20
9. "Side Pocket" − 2:05
10. "Why, Daddy?" − 3:08
11. "Call Me Mister Tibbs (End Title)" − 0:46

=== Personnel ===
- Unidentified orchestra arranged and conducted by Quincy Jones including
  - Carol Kaye - electric bass
  - Chuck Findley - trumpet
  - Emil Richards - percussion

== See also ==
- List of American films of 1970
