= 1967 New York Film Critics Circle Awards =

33rd New York Film Critics Circle Awards

33rd New York Film Critics Circle Awards

January 28, 1968
(announced December 28, 1967)

Best Picture:
In the Heat of the Night

The 33rd New York Film Critics Circle Awards, honored the best filmmaking of 1967.

== Winners ==
- Best Actor:
  - Rod Steiger - In the Heat of the Night
- Best Actress:
  - Edith Evans - The Whisperers
- Best Director:
  - Mike Nichols - The Graduate
- Best Film:
  - In the Heat of the Night
- Best Foreign Language Film:
  - The War Is Over (La guerre est finie) • France/Sweden
- Best Screenplay:
  - David Newman and Robert Benton - Bonnie and Clyde
- Special Award:
  - Bosley Crowther
