= In the Heat of the Night (film) =

1967 film by Norman Jewison

- Theatrical release poster
- Directed by: Norman Jewison
- Screenplay by: Stirling Silliphant
- Based on: In the Heat of the Night by John Ball
- Produced by: Walter Mirisch
- Starring: Sidney Poitier; Rod Steiger; Warren Oates; Lee Grant
- Cinematography: Haskell Wexler, A.S.C.
- Edited by: Hal Ashby
- Music by: Quincy Jones
- Production company: The Mirisch Corporation
- Distributed by: United Artists
- Release date: August 2, 1967
- Running time: 110 minutes
- Country: United States
- Language: English
- Budget: $2 million
- Box office: $24.4 million

In the Heat of the Night is a 1967 American Southern Gothic neo-noir film directed by Norman Jewison, produced by Walter Mirisch, and starring Sidney Poitier and Rod Steiger. It tells the story of Virgil Tibbs (Poitier), a black police detective from Philadelphia, who becomes embroiled in a murder investigation in a small town in Mississippi. The film was adapted by Stirling Silliphant from John Ball's 1965 novel of the same name.

Released by United Artists in August 1967, the film was a widespread critical and commercial success. At the 40th Academy Awards, the film was nominated for seven Oscars, winning five, including Best Picture, Best Adapted Screenplay, and Best Actor for Rod Steiger. Quincy Jones' score, featuring a title song performed by Ray Charles, was nominated for a Grammy Award. The success of the film spawned two film sequels featuring Poitier, and a television series of the same name, which aired from 1988 to 1995.

In the Heat of the Night is widely considered one of the most important American films of the 1960s. The quote "They call me Mister Tibbs!" was listed as number 16 on the American Film Institute's 100 Years...100 Movie Quotes, a list of top film quotes. The film also appears on AFI's 100 Years...100 Movies, a list of the 100 greatest movies in American cinema. In 2002, the film was selected for preservation in the United States National Film Registry by the Library of Congress as being "culturally, historically, or aesthetically significant".

== Plot ==
In September 1966, wealthy industrialist Phillip Colbert and his wife are in Sparta, Mississippi, to oversee the building of a factory. Late one night, police officer Sam Wood discovers Colbert's corpse in the street. Wood finds Virgil Tibbs, a black man with a fat wallet, at the train station and arrests him. Police Chief Bill Gillespie accuses him of murder and robbery, but learns Tibbs is a homicide detective for the Philadelphia Police Department, who was passing through town after visiting his mother. Tibbs wants to leave town on the next train, but his Chief in Philadelphia requests Tibbs stay in Sparta to help Gillespie with the murder investigation. Though Gillespie, like many of Sparta's white residents, is racist, he and Tibbs reluctantly agree to work together.

A doctor estimates that Colbert had been dead for less than an hour when his body was found. Tibbs examines the body and concludes that the murder happened much earlier, the killer was right-handed, and the victim had been killed elsewhere and moved to where Wood found his body.

Gillespie arrests another suspect, Harvey Oberst, who protests his innocence. Tibbs, after being jailed for withholding his findings after examining the body, reveals that Oberst is left-handed and has witnesses to confirm his alibi. Frustrated by the ineptitude of the police but impressed by Tibbs, Colbert's widow threatens to halt construction of the factory unless Tibbs leads the investigation.

Tibbs initially suspects the murderer is wealthy plantation owner Eric Endicott, a genteel racist and Sparta's most powerful citizen, who opposed Colbert's new factory. When Tibbs begins interrogating him, Endicott slaps him, and Tibbs slaps him back. Gillespie accuses Tibbs of also being racist for focusing the investigation on Endicott. Afterwards, Endicott sends a gang of thugs after him. Gillespie rescues Tibbs and tells him to leave town to save himself, but Tibbs is determined to stay and solve the case.

Tibbs asks Officer Wood to retrace his patrol car route during the night of the murder; Gillespie joins them. After questioning why Wood detours from his patrol route, Tibbs discovers that Wood enjoys passing the house of 16-year-old Delores Purdy, who walks around nude with the lights on in an attempt to entice men, and that Wood changed his route to prevent Tibbs from seeing her. Gillespie learns that Wood made a $632 deposit to his bank account the day after the murder. He arrests Wood, despite Tibbs's protests that he is not the murderer. Tibbs tells Gillespie that the murder was committed at the site of the planned factory, which clears Wood because he could not have driven both his car and Colbert's car back into town.

Delores' older brother Lloyd, a hostile racist, brings her to the police station to file statutory rape charges against Wood for getting her pregnant. When Tibbs insists on being present during Delores' questioning, Lloyd is offended and gathers a lynch mob to attack Tibbs.

Tibbs pressures illegal abortionist Mama Caleba to reveal that she is about to provide an abortion for Delores. When Delores arrives and sees Tibbs, she runs away. Tibbs follows Delores and confronts her armed boyfriend, Ralph Henshaw, a cook at a roadside diner. Lloyd's mob arrives and holds Tibbs at gunpoint.

Tibbs tells Lloyd to check Delores' purse for the $100 Ralph Henshaw gave her for an abortion, which he got from killing and robbing Colbert. Lloyd realizes that Tibbs is right when he opens the purse and finds the money. After Lloyd confronts Henshaw for getting his sister pregnant, Henshaw shoots Lloyd dead. Tibbs grabs Henshaw's gun. Henshaw is arrested and confesses to killing Colbert.

Gillespie carries Tibbs’ suitcase to the train station and bids him farewell. They warmly smile at each other, making it clear there was no longer animosity between them.

== Cast ==
- Sidney Poitier as Detective Virgil Tibbs
- Rod Steiger as Police Chief Bill Gillespie
- Warren Oates as Officer Sam Wood
- Lee Grant as Mrs. Colbert
- Larry Gates as Eric Endicott
- James Patterson as Lloyd Purdy
- William Schallert as Mayor Schubert
- Beah Richards as Mama Caleba
- Peter Whitney as Courtney
- Kermit Murdock as Henderson
- Larry D. Mann as Watkins
- Matt Clark as "Packy" Harrison
- Arthur Malet as Ulam
- Fred Stewart as Dr. Stuart
- Quentin Dean as Delores Purdy
- Scott Wilson as Harvey Oberst
- Timothy Scott as Shagbag
- William C. Watson as McNeil
- Eldon Quick as Charles Hawthorne
- Stuart Nisbet as Shuie
- Khalil Bezaleel as Jess
- Peter Masterson as Fryer
- Jester Hairston as butler
- Phil Adams as 1st tough
- Nikita Knatz as 2nd tough
- Sam Reese as Clerk
- Anthony James as Ralph Henshaw

=== Uncredited ===
- Alan Oppenheimer as Ted Appleton
- Buzz Barton as train conductor
- Clegg Hoyt as sheriff's deputy

== Production ==
=== Casting ===
Both Sidney Poitier and Rod Steiger were the first choices to play their roles. According to the AFI Catalog of Feature Films, the two were "old friends who had long sought an opportunity to work together."

In the Heat of the Night was the film debut for several of its actors - Scott Wilson, Anthony James, Quentin Dean, and Eldon Quick. Clegg Hoyt's unbilled appearance in this film was his final acting role. He died two months after the film's release.

=== Filming ===
Although the film was set in Sparta, Mississippi, most of the movie was filmed in Sparta, Illinois, where many of the town's landmarks can still be seen. The original novel was set in the (fictional) town of "Wells, South Carolina", but the name of the town was changed to Sparta so that the filmmakers could use the existing signage and storefronts. The producers were unaware that "Sparta, Mississippi" was a real town, and the film's depiction bears little resemblance to the real community. For example, the film's Sparta is situated along Interstate 20, while the real town is nowhere near any interstate.

Jewison, Poitier, and Steiger worked together and got along well during filming, but Jewison had problems with the Southern authorities, and Poitier had reservations about coming south of the Mason–Dixon line. However, despite their reservations, Jewison decided to shoot part of the film in Dyersburg and Union City, Tennessee anyway, while the rest was filmed in Sparta, Chester (Harvey Oberst chase scene), and Freeburg (Compton's diner), Illinois.

The film is notable for being the first major Hollywood film in color lit with proper consideration for a Black person. Haskell Wexler recognized that standard strong lighting used in filming tended to produce too much glare on dark complexions and rendered the features indistinct. Accordingly, Wexler adjusted the lighting to feature Poitier with better photographic results.

=== Slapping scene ===
Tibbs slapping Endicott is not present in the novel. According to Poitier, the scene was almost not in the movie; he proposed the scene. In an interview, Poitier stated: "I said, 'I'll tell you what, I'll make this movie for you if you give me your absolute guarantee when he slaps me I slap him right back and you guarantee that it will play in every version of this movie.' I try not to do things that are against nature." Mark Harris, in his book, Pictures at a Revolution, states that copies of the original draft of the screenplay clearly depict the scene as filmed, which Jewison and Silliphant confirmed. Nevertheless, Poitier is correct that Tibbs' slapping of Endicott was not originally envisioned. After Endicott's slap, Silliphant's initial step-outline reads: "Tibbs has all he can do to restrain himself. The butler drops his head, starts to pray. 'For him, Uncle Tom', Tibbs says furiously, 'not for me!'" Tibbs' counter slap first appears in Silliphant's revised step-outline.

Tibbs' urging the butler to pray for Endicott was part of Silliphant's adaptation of In the Heat of the Night as a subversive Christian allegory, featuring Tibbs as the messianic outsider who confronts the racist establishment of Sparta.

== Music ==
In the Heat of the Night

Soundtrack album by Quincy Jones
- Released: 1967
- Recorded: 1967
- Genre: Film score
- Length: 33:34
- Labels: United Artists; UAL 4160/UAS 5160

Quincy Jones chronology
Enter Laughing (1966)	In the Heat of the Night (1967)	In Cold Blood (1967)

The film score was composed, arranged and conducted by Quincy Jones, and the soundtrack album was released on the United Artists label in 1967. The title song performed by Ray Charles, composed by Quincy Jones, with lyrics by Alan and Marilyn Bergman was released as a single by ABC Records and reached #33 on the Billboard Hot 100 chart and #21 on the Hot Rhythm & Blues Singles chart.

Professional ratings
Review scores
Source	Rating
AllMusic	3/5 stars

AllMusic's Steven McDonald said the soundtrack had "a tone of righteous fury woven throughout" and that "the intent behind In the Heat of the Night was to get a Southern, blues-inflected atmosphere to support the angry, anti-racist approach of the picture ... although the cues from In the Heat of the Night show their age". The Vinyl Factory said "this soundtrack to a film about racism in the South has a cool, decidedly Southern-fried sound with funk-bottomed bluesy touches, like on the strutting 'Cotton Curtain', the down 'n' dirty 'Whipping Boy' or the fat 'n' sassy 'Chief's Drive to Mayor'".

=== Track listing ===
All compositions by Quincy Jones.

1. "In the Heat of the Night' (Lyrics by Alan and Marilyn Bergman) – 2:30
2. "Peep-Freak Patrol Car" – 1:30
3. "Cotton Curtain" – 2:33
4. "Where Whitey Ain't Around" – 1:11
5. "Whipping Boy" – 1:25
6. "No You Won't" – 1:34
7. "Nitty Gritty Time" – 1:50
8. "It Sure Is Groovy!" – 2:30 (Lyrics by Alan and Marilyn Bergman)
9. "Bowlegged Polly" – 2:30 (Lyrics by Alan and Marilyn Bergman)
10. "Shag Bag, Hounds & Harvey" – 3:28
11. "Chief's Drive to Mayor" —1:10
12. "Give Me Until Morning" – 1:09
13. "On Your Feet, Boy!" – 1:37
14. "Blood & Roots" – 1:07
15. "Mama Caleba's Blues" – 5:00
16. "Foul Owl [on the Prowl]" – 2:30 (Lyrics by Alan and Marilyn Bergman)

=== Personnel ===
- Unidentified orchestra arranged and conducted by Quincy Jones including
  - Ray Charles – vocals (track 1), piano (track 15)
  - Glen Campbell – vocals (track 9), banjo
  - Gil Bernal – vocals (track 8)
  - Boomer and Travis – vocals (track 16)
  - Roland Kirk – flute
  - Bobby Scott – tack piano
  - Billy Preston – electric organ (track 1)
  - Ray Brown – bass
  - Carol Kaye – electric bass
  - Don Elliott – human instrument
  - The Raelettes – backing vocals (track 1)

== Reception ==
In contrast to films like The Chase and Hurry Sundown, which offered confused visions of the South, In the Heat of the Night depicted a tough, edgy vision of a Southern town that seemed to hate outsiders, a theme reflecting the uncertain mood of the time, just as the civil rights movement attempted to take hold. Canadian director Jewison wanted to tell a story of a White man and a Black man working together in spite of difficulties. Jewison said that this film proved a conviction he had held for a long time: "It's you against the world. It's like going to war. Everybody is trying to tell you something different and they are always putting obstacles in your way."

A particularly famous line in the film comes immediately after Gillespie mocks the name "Virgil":

Gillespie: "That's a funny name for a nigger boy that comes from Philadelphia! What do they call you up there?"
Tibbs (annoyed): "They call me Mister Tibbs!"

This reply was later listed as number 16 on the American Film Institute's 100 Years...100 Movie Quotes, a list of top film quotes, and was also the title of the movie's sequel. Among other places, it was referenced by Pumbaa in The Lion King.

Another important scene that surprised audiences at the time occurs when Endicott slaps Tibbs, who immediately slaps Endicott back. In a San Francisco pre-screening, Jewison was concerned when the young audience was laughing at the film as if it were a comedy. The audience's stunned reaction to the slapping scene convinced Jewison that the film was effective as drama. That scene helped make the film so popular for audiences, finally seeing the top black film actor physically strike back against bigotry, that the film earned the nickname, Superspade Versus the Rednecks. During the film's initial run, Steiger and Poitier occasionally went to the Capitol Theatre in New York to amuse themselves seeing how many black and white audience members there were, which could be immediately ascertained by listening to the former cheering Tibbs's retaliatory slap and the latter whispering "Oh!" in astonishment.

=== Critical response ===
Bosley Crowther of The New York Times praised Jewison for crafting "a film that has the look and sound of actuality and the pounding pulse of truth." He further praised Steiger and Poitier for "each giving physical authority and personal depth" to their performances. Richard Schickel of Life magazine wrote that "almost everything in this movie is good—the sharply drawn minor characters, the careful plotting, the wonderful rightness of each scene's setting, mood and dialogue. Most admirable of all is the way everyone avoids oversimplifications." John Mahoney of The Hollywood Reporter deemed the film to be "a gripping and suspenseful murder mystery that effects a feeling of greater importance by its veneer of social significance and the illusion of depth in its use of racial color."

Time magazine applauded the film's theme of racial unity that was "immeasurably helped by performances from Steiger and Poitier that break brilliantly with black-white stereotype." Roger Ebert gave In the Heat of the Night a positive review, praising Steiger's performance although he noted "the story itself was slightly too pat". He would later place it at number ten on his Top Ten list of 1967 films. Arthur D. Murphy of Variety felt that the excellent Poitier and outstanding Steiger performances overcame noteworthy flaws, including an uneven script. Penelope Gilliatt of The New Yorker thought it had "a spurious air of concern about the afflictions of the real America at the moment" and that it is "essentially a primitive rah-rah story about an underdog's triumph over a bully".

Akira Kurosawa cited In the Heat of the Night as one of his favorite films.

On the review aggregator website Rotten Tomatoes, the film holds an approval rating of 96% based on 89 reviews, with an average rating of 8.40/10. Its consensus states, "Tense, funny, and thought-provoking all at once, and lifted by strong performances from Sidney Poitier and Rod Steiger, director Norman Jewison's look at murder and racism in small-town America continues to resonate today." Metacritic assigned a score of 75 based on 14 reviews, indicating "generally favorable" reviews.

=== Box office ===
The film opened at the Capitol Theatre and at the 86th Street East theatre in New York City on Wednesday, August 2, 1967, grossing $108,107 in its first five days. It opened in Miami Beach, Florida and in Toronto on Friday, August 4 and grossed $20,974 for the weekend which, together with the New York grosses, combined to give a weekend gross of $95,806. It was released soon after race riots in Newark, Milwaukee, and Detroit. By January 1971, the film had earned $11 million in box office rentals from the United States and Canada.

=== Accolades ===
Award	Category	Nominee(s)	Result
Academy Awards	Best Picture	Walter Mirisch	Won
Academy Awards	Best Director	Norman Jewison	Nominated
Academy Awards	Best Actor	Rod Steiger	Won
Academy Awards	Best Screenplay – Based on Material from Another Medium	Stirling Silliphant	Won
Academy Awards	Best Film Editing	Hal Ashby	Won
Academy Awards	Best Sound	Samuel Goldwyn Studio Sound Department	Won
Academy Awards	Best Sound Effects	James Richard	Nominated
American Cinema Editors Awards	Best Edited Feature Film – Dramatic	Hal Ashby	Nominated
British Academy Film Awards	Best Film	Norman Jewison	Nominated
British Academy Film Awards	Best Foreign Actor	Sidney Poitier	Nominated
British Academy Film Awards	Best Foreign Actor	Rod Steiger	Won
British Academy Film Awards	United Nations Award	Norman Jewison	Won
Directors Guild of America Awards	Outstanding Directorial Achievement in Motion Pictures	Norman Jewison	Nominated
Edgar Allan Poe Awards	Best Motion Picture Screenplay	Stirling Silliphant	Won
Golden Globe Awards	Best Motion Picture – Drama		Won
Golden Globe Awards	Best Actor in a Motion Picture – Drama	Sidney Poitier	Nominated
Golden Globe Awards	Best Actor in a Motion Picture – Drama	Rod Steiger	Won
Golden Globe Awards	Best Supporting Actress – Motion Picture	Quentin Dean	Nominated
Golden Globe Awards	Best Supporting Actress – Motion Picture	Lee Grant	Nominated
Golden Globe Awards	Best Director – Motion Picture	Norman Jewison	Nominated
Golden Globe Awards	Best Screenplay – Motion Picture	Stirling Silliphant	Won
Grammy Awards	Best Original Score Written for a Motion Picture or Television Show	Quincy Jones	Nominated
Kansas City Film Critics Circle Awards	Best Actor	Rod Steiger	Won (Note: Tied with Paul Scofield for A Man for All Seasons.)
Laurel Awards	Top Drama		Won
Laurel Awards	Top Male Dramatic Performance	Sidney Poitier	Nominated
Laurel Awards	Top Male Dramatic Performance	Rod Steiger	Won
National Film Preservation Board	National Film Registry		Inducted
National Society of Film Critics Awards	Best Actor	Rod Steiger	Won
National Society of Film Critics Awards	Best Cinematography	Haskell Wexler	Won
New York Film Critics Circle Awards	Best Film		Won
New York Film Critics Circle Awards	Best Actor	Rod Steiger	Won
Online Film & Television Association Awards	Hall of Fame – Motion Picture		Won
Sant Jordi Awards	Best Foreign Film	Norman Jewison	Won
Sant Jordi Awards	Best Performance in a Foreign Film	Rod Steiger (also for The Loved One and No Way to Treat a Lady)	Won
Writers Guild of America Awards	Best Written American Drama	Stirling Silliphant	Nominated

== Legacy ==
In 2003, In the Heat of the Night was selected by The New York Times as one of the 1000 Best Movies Ever Made.

=== American Film Institute recognition ===
The film appears on several 100 Years lists by the American Film Institute.

- AFI's 100 Years...100 Movies (10th Anniversary Edition): #75
- AFI's 100 Years...100 Heroes & Villains:
  - Virgil Tibbs: #19 Hero
- AFI's 100 Years...100 Movie Quotes:
  - Virgil Tibbs: "They call me Mister Tibbs!": #16
- AFI's 100 Years...100 Cheers: #21

=== Preservation ===
The Academy Film Archive preserved In the Heat of the Night in 1997. In 2002, the film was selected for preservation in the United States National Film Registry by the Library of Congress as being "culturally, historically, or aesthetically significant".

== Home media ==
In the Heat of the Night was first released on DVD in 2001. The only extras in that release were the theatrical trailer, and audio commentary with Norman Jewison, Haskell Wexler, Rod Steiger and Lee Grant.

Another DVD was released in 2008 to coincide the film's 40th Anniversary.

In 2010, the film was digitized in High Definition (1080i) and broadcast on MGM HD.

MGM released the film on Blu-ray on January 14, 2014, through 20th Century Fox. The release ports over all the extras from the 2001 and 40th Anniversary DVDs.

Another DVD and Blu-ray were released by The Criterion Collection on January 29, 2019. The release contained new and previously released extras.

Kino Lorber released In the Heat of the Night as a two-disc 4K Ultra HD/Blu-ray set on April 19, 2022. The main disc includes the UHD SDR version of the film plus two audio commentaries including the 2001 commentary and a brand new commentary featuring historians Steve Mitchell and Nathaniel Thompson, and Robert Mirisch. The special features Blu-ray contained the sequels They Call Me Mister Tibbs! and The Organization in addition to the 40th Anniversary extras, and theatrical trailers for all three films.

== Sequels and adaptations ==
The film was followed by two sequels with Poitier, They Call Me Mister Tibbs! (1970) and The Organization (1971). Neither of the films were based on Ball's sequel novels. Both films still did fairly well at the box office though to less critical acclaim.

The film and the novel were the basis of a television series of the same name, which aired from 1988 until 1995. The series serves as a sequel to the film's events, with Virgil Tibbs returning to Sparta and joining the local police force full time as its new Chief of Detectives. The series starred Howard Rollins as Tibbs and Carroll O'Connor as Gillespie. It received a generally positive critical response, with Rollins winning an NAACP Image Award and O'Connor winning a Primetime Emmy Award.

== See also ==
- List of American films of 1967

== Bibliography ==
- Harris, Mark (2008). Pictures at A Revolution: Five Movies and the Birth of a New Hollywood. New York: Penguin Press. ISBN 978-0-143-11503-8.
