= Bonnie and Clyde (film) =

1967 film by Arthur Penn

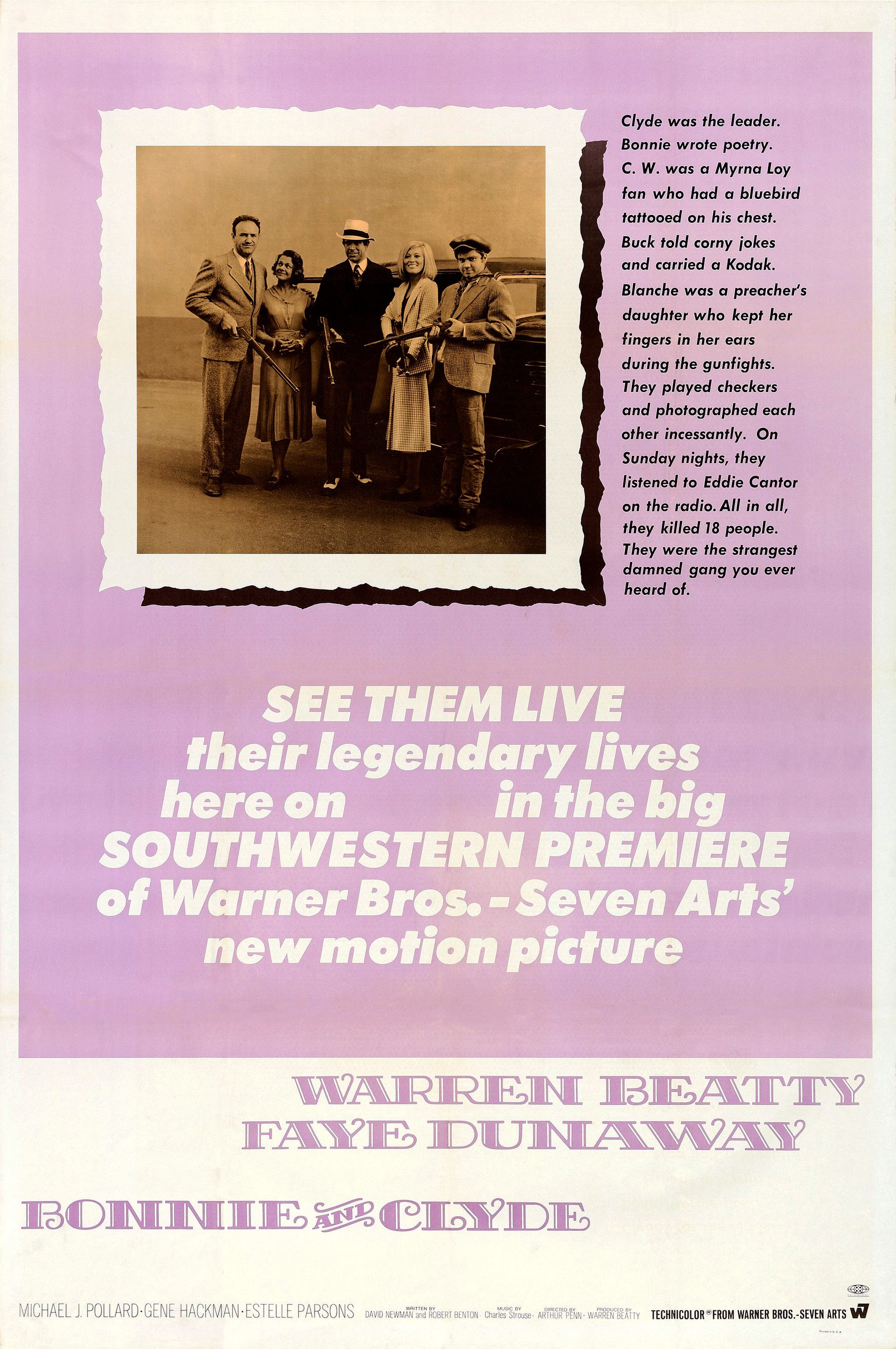
- Theatrical release poster
- Directed by: Arthur Penn
- Written by: David Newman; Robert Benton
- Produced by: Warren Beatty
- Starring: Warren Beatty; Faye Dunaway; Michael J. Pollard; Gene Hackman; Estelle Parsons
- Cinematography: Burnett Guffey
- Edited by: Dede Allen
- Music by: Charles Strouse
- Production company: Warner Bros. Pictures
- Distributed by: Warner Bros.-Seven Arts
- Release dates: August 4, 1967 (Montreal); August 13, 1967 (United States)
- Running time: 111 minutes
- Country: United States
- Language: English
- Budget: $2.5 million
- Box office: $70 million

Bonnie and Clyde is a 1967 American biographical crime drama film directed by Arthur Penn and starring Warren Beatty and Faye Dunaway as Clyde Barrow and Bonnie Parker, outlaws and romantic partners in the Great Depression-era American South. The cast also features Michael J. Pollard, Gene Hackman, and Estelle Parsons. The screenplay was written by David Newman and Robert Benton (with uncredited contributions by Beatty and Robert Towne); Beatty also produced the film.

The film was released in the United States by Warner Bros.-Seven Arts on August 13, 1967. It is considered a turning point for American cinema. Initial critical reception was mixed but later swung positive, and the film became a significant commercial success, becoming one of the highest-grossing films of 1967. It was nominated for 10 Academy Awards including for Best Picture, winning Best Supporting Actress (for Estelle Parsons) and Best Cinematography (Burnett Guffey).

Bonnie and Clyde is considered one of the first films of the New Hollywood era and a landmark picture. It broke many cinematic taboos, and for some members of the counterculture, the film was seen as a "rallying cry" against the establishment, both for its portrayal of a bank robbery as a form of revolution and for its sympathetic depiction of criminals contrasted against the police. Its success prompted other filmmakers to be more open in presenting sex and violence in their films. The film's ending became famous as "one of the bloodiest death scenes in cinematic history." In 1992, it was selected for preservation in the United States National Film Registry by the Library of Congress as "culturally, historically, or aesthetically significant." It was ranked 27th on the American Film Institute's 1998 list of the 100 greatest American films of all time and 42nd on its 2007 list.

== Plot ==
During the Great Depression, Clyde Barrow and Bonnie Parker of Texas meet when Clyde tries to steal Bonnie's mother's car. Bored with her job as a waitress, Bonnie becomes intrigued by Clyde and decides to partner with him in crime. They pull off some holdups, but their amateur efforts, while exciting, are not very lucrative. Bonnie and Clyde turn from small-time heists to bank robbing.

The duo's crime spree shifts into high gear once they hook up with a dim-witted gas station attendant, C.W. Moss. Their exploits also become more violent. After C.W. botches parking during a bank robbery and delays their escape, Clyde shoots the bank manager in the face when he jumps onto the slow-moving car's running board. Clyde's older brother, Buck, and his wife, Blanche, a preacher's daughter, also join them. The two women develop an immediate dislike for each other, which only intensifies over time. Blanche has nothing but disdain for Bonnie, Clyde, and C.W., while Bonnie sees Blanche's flightiness as a constant danger to the gang's survival.

In Joplin, Missouri, local police show up at the gang's rented house after being alerted by a grocery delivery boy, believing they are dealing with bootleggers, not bank robbers; two policemen are killed in a shootout. The gang is pursued by law enforcement, including Texas Ranger Frank Hamer, whom they capture and humiliate before leaving him adrift on a boat while handcuffed. The five outlaws then pull a heist, during which a police chase disables their vehicle. They steal Eugene Grizzard's car and take him and his girlfriend captive before quickly abandoning them when they learn he is an undertaker.

Bonnie wants to visit her family in Texas and give them part of the heist funds, to which Clyde reluctantly acquiesces despite the risk. An ambush by law enforcement overnight catches the gang off guard, resulting in numerous casualties. Buck is mortally wounded by a shot to his head, and Blanche is injured in one eye, losing sight in it. Bonnie, Clyde, and C.W. barely escape alive, while Blanche falls into police custody. Hamer then tricks her into revealing C.W.'s name (until then he was only an "unidentified suspect").

C.W. takes the wounded Bonnie and Clyde to hide out at the house of his father, Ivan, who thinks the couple has corrupted his son (as evidenced by an ornate tattoo Bonnie convinced C.W. to get). The elder Moss makes a deal with Hamer: in exchange for mercy for C.W., he sets a trap for the outlaws. When Bonnie and Clyde stop on the side of the road to help Mr. Moss fix a flat tire, a flock of birds flies out of the nearby bushes and Ivan dives for cover. Just as Bonnie and Clyde realize they have walked into a trap, the posse in the bushes guns them down. After the shooting is over, Hamer and his men come out of hiding and gather around the couple's bodies.

== Cast ==
- Warren Beatty as Clyde Barrow
- Faye Dunaway as Bonnie Parker
- Michael J. Pollard as C. W. Moss (composite character of W. D. Jones and Henry Methvin)
- Gene Hackman as Buck Barrow
- Estelle Parsons as Blanche Barrow
- Denver Pyle as Frank Hamer
- Dub Taylor as Ivan Moss
- Evans Evans as Velma Davis
- Gene Wilder as Eugene Grizzard

=== Cast notes ===
Gene Wilder was in his film debut as Eugene Grizzard, one of Bonnie and Clyde's hostages. His girlfriend, Velma Davis, was played by Evans Evans. The family gathering scene was filmed in Red Oak, Texas, where many residents gathered to watch. When the filmmakers noticed Mabel Cavitt, a local schoolteacher, among the people gathered, she was cast as Bonnie Parker's mother.

== Production and style ==
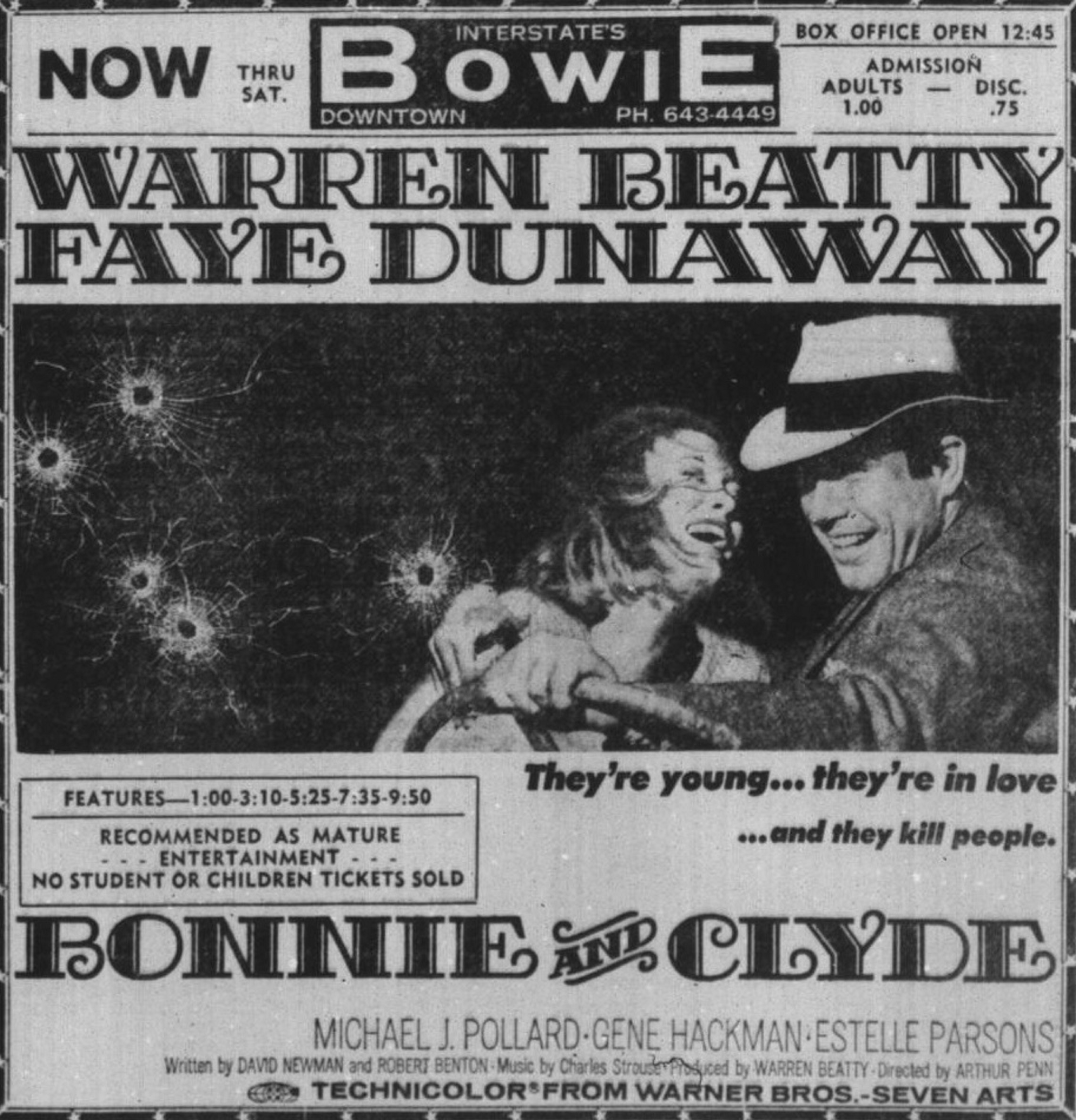
Advertisement from 1967

The film was intended as a romantic and comic version of the violent gangster films of the 1930s, updated with modern filmmaking techniques. Arthur Penn portrayed some of the violent scenes with a comic tone, sometimes reminiscent of Keystone Cops-style slapstick films, then shifted disconcertingly into horrific and graphic violence. The film has the French New Wave directors' influence, both in its rapid shifts of tone and in its choppy editing, which is particularly noticeable in its closing sequence.

The first handling of the script was in the early 1960s. Influenced by the French New Wave writers and not yet completed, Newman and Benton sent Penn an early draft. He already was engaged in production decisions for The Chase (1966) and could not get involved in the script for Bonnie and Clyde. The writers sent their script to François Truffaut, who made contributions but passed on the project, next directing Fahrenheit 451. At Truffaut's suggestion, the writers, much excited (the film's producers were less so), approached filmmaker Jean-Luc Godard.

Some sources claim Godard did not trust Hollywood and refused. Benton claimed that Godard wanted to shoot the film in New Jersey in January during the winter. He purportedly took offense when would-be producer Norah Wright objected that his desire was unreasonable, as the story took place in Texas, which has a warm climate year-round. Her partner Elinor Jones claimed the two did not believe Godard was right for the project in the first place. Godard's retort: « Je vous parle de cinéma, vous me parlez de météo. Au revoir. » ("I'm talking cinema and you're talking weather. Goodbye.") After the 1968 Academy Awards, Godard sent Benton and Newman a cable that read, "Now, let's make it all over again!"

Soon after the failed negotiations for production, Beatty was visiting Paris and learned through Truffaut of the project and its path. On returning to Hollywood, Beatty requested to see the script and bought the rights. A meeting with Godard was not productive. Beatty changed his approach and convinced the writers that while the script at first reading was very much of the French New Wave style, an American director was necessary for the subject.

Beatty offered the directing position to George Stevens, William Wyler, Karel Reisz, John Schlesinger, Brian G. Hutton, and Sydney Pollack, all of whom turned it down. Penn turned it down several times before Beatty finally persuaded him to direct the film. Beatty was entitled to 40% of the profits of the film and gave Penn 10%.

When Beatty was on board as producer only, his sister and actress Shirley MacLaine was a strong possibility to play Bonnie. When Beatty decided to play Clyde, they needed a different actress. Considered for the role were Jane Fonda, Tuesday Weld, Ann-Margret, Sharon Tate, Leslie Caron, Carol Lynley, and Sue Lyon. Cher auditioned for the part, and Beatty begged Natalie Wood to play the role. Wood declined, to concentrate on her therapy, and acknowledged that working with Beatty before had been "difficult". Faye Dunaway later said that she won the part "by the skin of her teeth!"

The film is forthright in its handling of sexuality, but that theme was toned down from its conception. Originally, Benton and Newman wrote Clyde as bisexual. He and Bonnie were to have a three-way sexual relationship with their male getaway driver. Penn convinced the writers that the emotional complexity of the couple's relationship undercut the passion of the title characters. Such behavior would threaten the audience's sympathy for the characters and might result in their being written off as sexual deviants because they were criminals. Others said that Beatty was unwilling to have his character display that kind of sexuality and that the Production Code would never have allowed such content in the first place. Clyde is portrayed as asexual or, perhaps, demisexual.

Bonnie and Clyde was one of the first films to feature extensive use of squibs—small explosive charges, often mounted with bags of stage blood, that detonate inside an actor's clothes to simulate bullet hits. Released in an era when film shootings were generally depicted as bloodless and painless, the Bonnie and Clyde death scene was one of the first in mainstream American cinema to be depicted with graphic realism.

Beatty originally wanted the film to be shot in black and white, but Warner Bros. Pictures rejected the idea. Much of the studio's senior management was hostile to the film, especially Jack L. Warner, who considered the subject matter an unwanted throwback to Warner Bros.' early period when gangster films were a common product. Moreover, Warner was already annoyed at Beatty for refusing to star in PT 109 and defying Warner's favorite gesture of authority of showing the studio water tower with the WB logo on it. Beatty said, "Well, it's got your name, but it's got my initials." Warner complained about the costs of the film's extensive location shooting in Texas, which exceeded its production schedule and budget, and ordered the crew back to the studio backlot. It already had planned to return for final process shots.

=== Music ===
The instrumental banjo piece "Foggy Mountain Breakdown," performed by Flatt and Scruggs, was introduced to a worldwide audience as a result of its frequent use in the movie. Additional banjo music was written and performed by Doug Dillard. The use of this music is anachronistic because bluegrass dates from the mid-1940s rather than the 1930s. But the functionally similar old-time music genre was long established and widely recorded in the period of the film's events. Long out of print in vinyl and cassette formats, the film soundtrack was released on CD in 2009.

== Historical accuracy ==
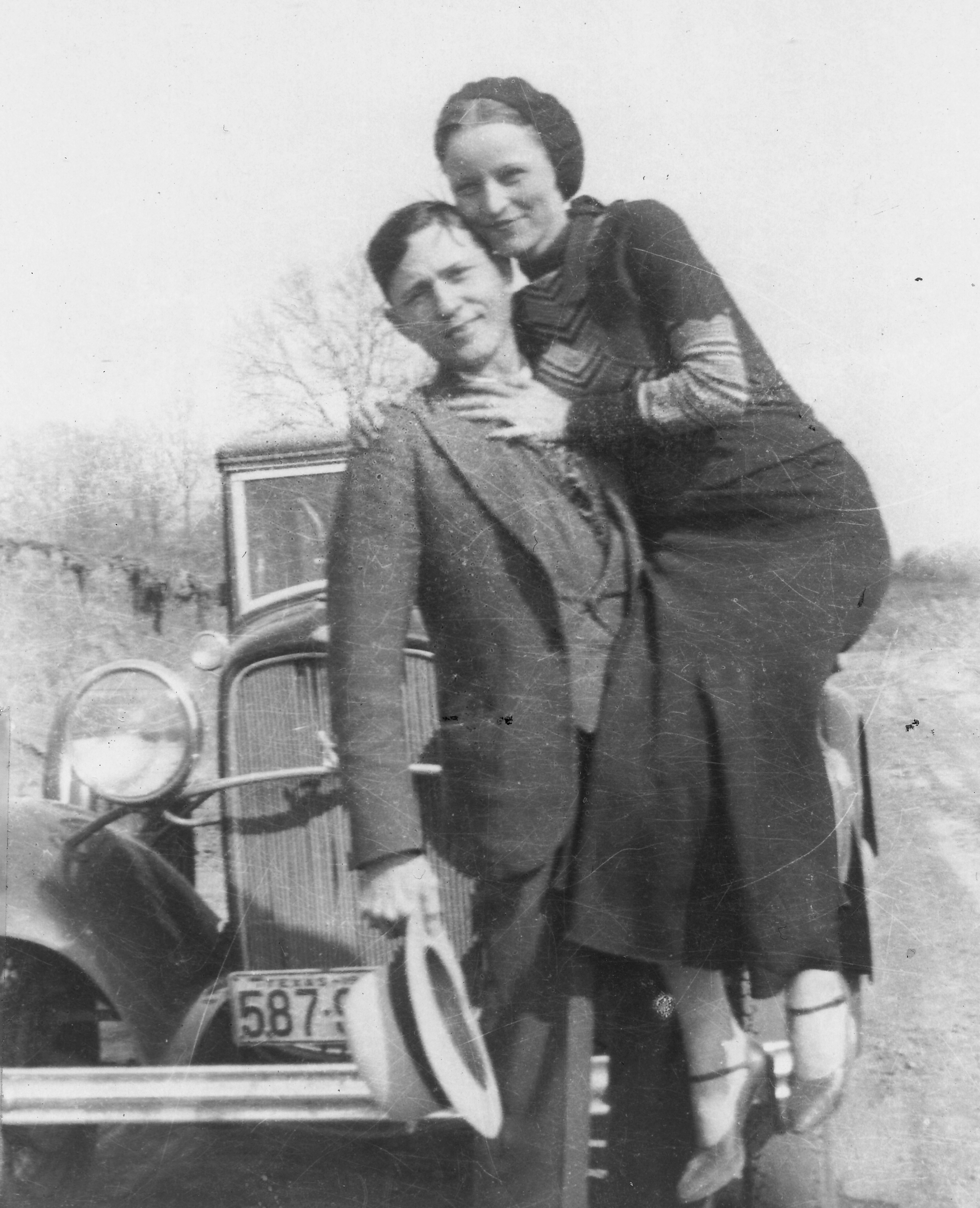
The real Bonnie and Clyde, March 1933

The film considerably simplifies the lives of Bonnie and Clyde and their gang. They were allied with other gang members, were repeatedly jailed, and committed other murders. In the part of the movie where Bonnie and Clyde escape the ambush that killed Buck Barrow and captured Blanche, Bonnie is shown being wounded by a deputy sheriff, whom Clyde then kills. Although they escaped the ambush, no lawmen were killed. Between June 1933 and April 1934, however, the Barrow gang did kill three law officers in Texas and Oklahoma.

On the run, they suffered a horrific auto accident in which Bonnie was severely burned and disabled. In the scene depicting their death, Bonnie and Clyde are portrayed as having stopped their automobile, with Clyde exiting the car and then looking back at Bonnie as they realize they have been trapped, but reports say the car was still moving when lawmen opened fire.

The sequence with Wilder and Evans is based on the Barrow gang's kidnappings of undertaker H.D. Darby and his acquaintance Sophia Stone, near Ruston, Louisiana, on April 27, 1933. The real Darby and Stone were not romantically involved. The gang also stole Darby's car.

The film is considered to stray far from fact in its portrayal of Frank Hamer as a vengeful bungler who was captured, humiliated, and released by Bonnie and Clyde. Hamer was a decorated Texas Ranger when he was coaxed out of semi-retirement to hunt the couple down. He had never met them before he and his posse ambushed and killed them near Gibsland, Louisiana, on May 23, 1934. In 1968, Hamer's widow and son sued the movie producers for defamation of character over his portrayal. They obtained an out-of-court settlement in 1971.

Bonnie and Clyde versus Dunaway and Beatty
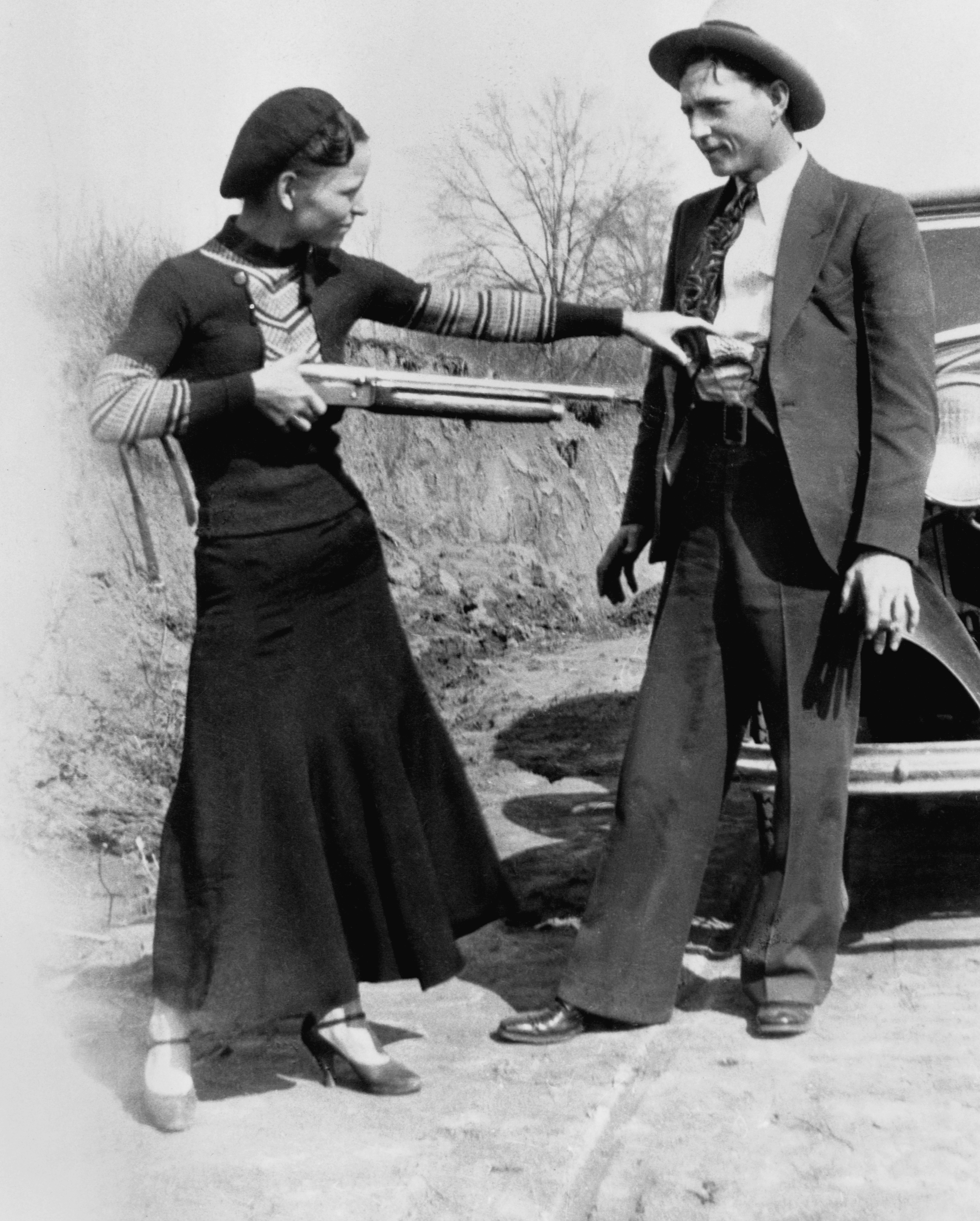
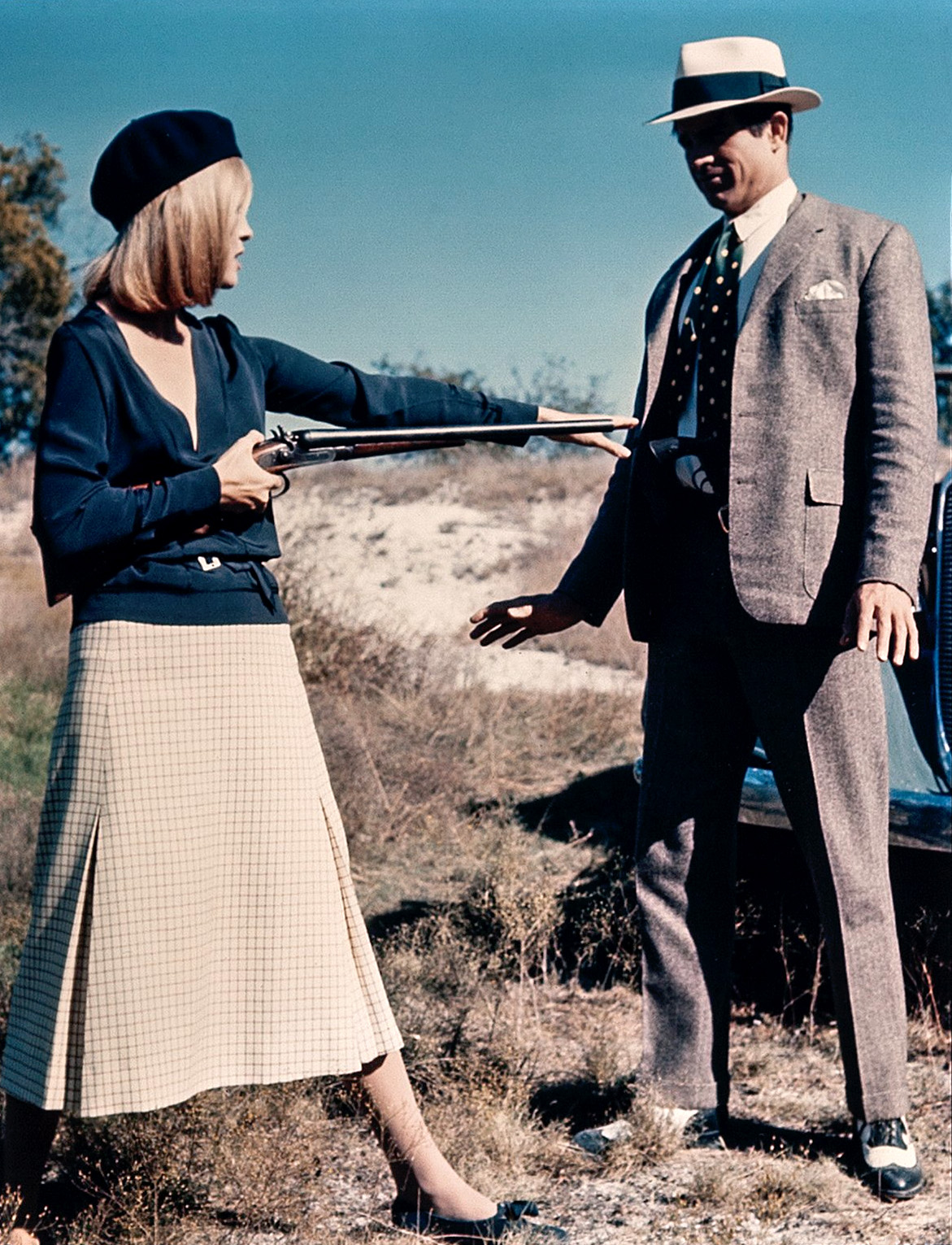
In 1932 "shotgun photo", Bonnie Parker points at Clyde Barrow; 1966 photo shows publicity reenactment with Faye Dunaway and Warren Beatty.

In 1933, police found undeveloped film in Bonnie and Clyde's hastily abandoned hideout in Joplin, Missouri. When they printed the negatives, one showed Bonnie holding a gun in her hand and a cigar between her teeth. Its publication nationwide typed her as a dramatic gun moll. The film portrays the taking of this playful photo. It implies the gang sent photos—and poetry—to the press, but this is untrue. The police found most of the gang's items in the Joplin cache. Bonnie's final poem, read aloud by her in the movie, was not published until after her death, when her mother released it.

The only two surviving members of the Barrow Gang when the film was released in 1967 were Blanche Barrow and W. D. Jones. While Barrow had approved the depiction of her in the original script, she objected to the later rewrites. At the film's release, she complained about Estelle Parsons's portrayal of her, saying, "That film made me look like a screaming horse's ass!"

== Release ==
The film premiered as the opening film of the Montreal International Film Festival on August 4, 1967.

At first, Warner Bros. did not promote Bonnie and Clyde for general release but mounted only limited regional releases that seemed to confirm its misgivings about the film's lack of commercial appeal. The film quickly did excellent sustained business in select urban theatres. While Jack Warner was selling the studio to Seven Arts Productions, he would have dumped the film but for the fact that Israel, of which Warner was a major supporter, had recently triumphed in the Six-Day War. Warner was feeling too defiant to sell any of his studio's films.

Meanwhile, Beatty complained to Warner Bros. that if the company was willing to go to so much trouble for Reflections in a Golden Eye (it had changed the coloration scheme at considerable expense), their neglect of his film, which was getting excellent press, suggested a conflict of interest; he threatened to sue the company. Warner Bros. gave Beatty's film a general release. Much to the surprise of Warner Bros.' management, the film became a major box-office success.

== Reception and legacy ==
The film was controversial at the time of release because of its apparent glorification of murderers and its level of graphic violence, which was unprecedented at the time. Bosley Crowther of The New York Times wrote, "It is a cheap piece of bald-faced slapstick comedy that treats the hideous depredations of that sleazy, moronic pair as though they were as full of fun and frolic as the Jazz Age cutups in Thoroughly Modern Millie." He was so appalled that he began to campaign against the increasing brutality of American films.

Dave Kaufman of Variety criticized the film for uneven direction and for portraying Bonnie and Clyde as bumbling, moronic types. Joe Morgenstern in Newsweek initially panned the film as a "squalid shoot-'em-up for the moron trade," but after seeing it a second time and noting the enthusiastic audience, he wrote a second article saying he had misjudged the film and praised it. Warner Bros. took advantage of this, marketing the film as having made a major critic change his mind about its virtues.

Roger Ebert gave Bonnie and Clyde a positive review, giving it four stars out of four. He called the film "a milestone in the history of American movies, a work of truth and brilliance," adding, "It is also pitilessly cruel, filled with sympathy, nauseating, funny, heartbreaking, and astonishingly beautiful. If it does not seem that those words should be strung together, perhaps that is because movies do not very often reflect the full range of human life." More than 30 years later, Ebert added the film to his list in The Great Movies, writing: "The movie opened like a slap in the face. American filmgoers had never seen anything like it." Film critics Dave Kehr and James Berardinelli have praised the film. Stephen Hunter, writing in Commentary in 2009, criticized the film's failure to adhere to the historical truth about Barrow, Parker, and Hamer.

The fierce debate about the film is discussed at length in the documentary For the Love of Movies: The Story of American Film Criticism (2009). This film chronicles what occurred as a result: The New York Times fired Crowther because his negative review seemed so out of touch with public opinion. Pauline Kael, who wrote a lengthy freelance essay in The New Yorker in praise of the film, where she attributed the Hollywood success of the film and its unsettled spirit to that of the French New Wave, was subsequently hired as the magazine's new staff critic.

The film was not expected to perform well at the box office but was a sleeper hit and by year's end had earned $2.5 million in theatrical rentals in the US and Canada. It continued to perform well in 1968 and by March 1968 had been in the top 12 films at the US box office for 22 weeks. By the end of 1968, it had become the studio's second-highest-grossing film of all time, behind My Fair Lady, with rentals of $19 million. By July 1968, the film had earned rentals of $10 million outside of the US and Canada. Listal lists it as one of the top five grossing films of 1967, with $50.7 million in US sales and $70 million worldwide. Beatty's profit participation (which he shared with Penn) earned him over $6 million and Penn over $2 million.

Although many believe the film's groundbreaking portrayal of violence adds to the film's artistic merit, Bonnie and Clyde is still sometimes criticized for opening the floodgates to heightened graphic violence in cinema and TV. It holds a 91% rating on Rotten Tomatoes from 74 reviews, with an average rating of 8.4/10. The site's consensus states, "A paradigm-shifting classic of American cinema, Bonnie and Clyde packs a punch whose power continues to reverberate through thrillers decades later." Metacritic, which uses a weighted average, assigned the film a score of 86 out of 100, based on 20 critics, indicating "universal acclaim".

== Accolades ==
Award	Category	Nominee(s)	Result
Academy Awards	Best Picture	Warren Beatty	Nominated
Academy Awards	Best Director	Arthur Penn	Nominated
Academy Awards	Best Actor	Warren Beatty	Nominated
Academy Awards	Best Actress	Faye Dunaway	Nominated
Academy Awards	Best Supporting Actor	Gene Hackman	Nominated
Academy Awards	Best Supporting Actor	Michael J. Pollard	Nominated
Academy Awards	Best Supporting Actress	Estelle Parsons	Won
Academy Awards	Best Story and Screenplay – Written Directly for the Screen	David Newman and Robert Benton	Nominated
Academy Awards	Best Cinematography	Burnett Guffey	Won
Academy Awards	Best Costume Design	Theadora Van Runkle	Nominated
American Cinema Editors Awards	Best Edited Feature Film	Dede Allen	Nominated
Bodil Awards	Best Non-European Film	Arthur Penn	Won
British Academy Film Awards	Best Film		Nominated
British Academy Film Awards	Best Foreign Actor	Warren Beatty	Nominated
British Academy Film Awards	Most Promising Newcomer to Leading Film Roles	Faye Dunaway (Note: Also for Hurry Sundown.)	Won
British Academy Film Awards	Most Promising Newcomer to Leading Film Roles	Michael J. Pollard	Nominated
David di Donatello Awards	Best Foreign Actor	Warren Beatty	Won (Note: Tied with Spencer Tracy for Guess Who's Coming to Dinner.)
David di Donatello Awards	Best Foreign Actress	Faye Dunaway	Won (Note: Tied with Katharine Hepburn for Guess Who's Coming to Dinner.)
Directors Guild of America Awards	Outstanding Directorial Achievement in Motion Pictures	Arthur Penn	Nominated
Edgar Allan Poe Awards	Best Motion Picture Screenplay	David Newman	Nominated
Golden Globe Awards	Best Motion Picture – Drama		Nominated
Golden Globe Awards	Best Actor in a Motion Picture – Drama	Warren Beatty	Nominated
Golden Globe Awards	Best Actress in a Motion Picture – Drama	Faye Dunaway	Nominated
Golden Globe Awards	Best Supporting Actor – Motion Picture	Michael J. Pollard	Nominated
Golden Globe Awards	Best Director – Motion Picture	Arthur Penn	Nominated
Golden Globe Awards	Best Screenplay – Motion Picture	David Newman and Robert Benton	Nominated
Golden Globe Awards	Most Promising Newcomer – Male	Michael J. Pollard	Nominated
Golden Reel Awards	Best Sound Editing – Feature Film		Won
Grammy Awards	Best Original Score Written for a Motion Picture or a Television Special	Charles Strouse	Nominated
Kansas City Film Critics Circle Awards	Best Film		Won
Kinema Junpo Awards	Best Foreign Film	Arthur Penn	Won
Kinema Junpo Awards	Best Foreign Director	Arthur Penn	Won
Laurel Awards	Top Action-Drama		Won
Laurel Awards	Top Female Dramatic Performance	Faye Dunaway	Won
Laurel Awards	Top Male Supporting Performance	Michael J. Pollard	Nominated
Laurel Awards	Top Female Supporting Performance	Estelle Parsons	Nominated
Mar del Plata International Film Festival	Best Film	Arthur Penn	Won
Mar del Plata International Film Festival	International Competition	Arthur Penn	Won
Mar del Plata International Film Festival	Special Mention	Faye Dunaway	Won
National Film Preservation Board	National Film Registry		Inducted
National Society of Film Critics Awards	Best Film		2nd Place
National Society of Film Critics Awards	Best Supporting Actor	Gene Hackman	Won
National Society of Film Critics Awards	Best Screenplay	David Newman and Robert Benton	Won
New York Film Critics Circle Awards	Best Film		Nominated
New York Film Critics Circle Awards	Best Director	Arthur Penn	Nominated
New York Film Critics Circle Awards	Best Screenplay	David Newman and Robert Benton	Won
Online Film & Television Association Awards	Film Hall of Fame: Productions		Inducted
Writers Guild of America Awards	Best Written American Drama	David Newman and Robert Benton	Won
Writers Guild of America Awards	Best Written American Original Screenplay	David Newman and Robert Benton	Won

=== Media recognition ===
Year	Presenter	Title	Rank	Refs
1999	Entertainment Weekly	100 Greatest Movies of All Time	48	
2005	Time	All-Time 100 Movies	N/A	
2010	Total Film	100 Greatest Movies of All Time	N/A	
2010	The Guardian	The 25 Best Crime Films of All Time	11	
2013	Entertainment Weekly	100 All-Time Greatest Movies	4	
2014	The Hollywood Reporter	Hollywood's 100 Favorite Films	99	
2014	James Berardinelli	James Berardinelli's All-Time Top 100	36	
2020	Time Out	The 100 Best Movies of All Time	99	

The film repeatedly has been honored by the American Film Institute:

- 1998 – AFI's 100 Years...100 Movies – #27
- 2001 – AFI's 100 Years...100 Thrills – #13
- 2002 – AFI's 100 Years...100 Passions – #65
- 2003 – AFI's 100 Years...100 Heroes and Villains
  - Clyde Barrow & Bonnie Parker – #32 Villains
- 2005 – AFI's 100 Years...100 Movie Quotes
  - "We rob banks." – #41
- 2007 – AFI's 100 Years...100 Movies (10th Anniversary Edition) – #42
- 2008 – AFI's 10 Top 10 – #5 Gangster film

In 1992, Bonnie and Clyde was selected for preservation in the United States National Film Registry by the Library of Congress as "culturally, historically, or aesthetically significant."

In 2012, the Motion Picture Editors Guild ranked the film the fifth best-edited film of all time, based on a survey of its membership.

The February 2020 issue of New York Magazine lists Bonnie and Clyde as among "The Best Movies That Lost Best Picture at the Oscars."

== Influence ==
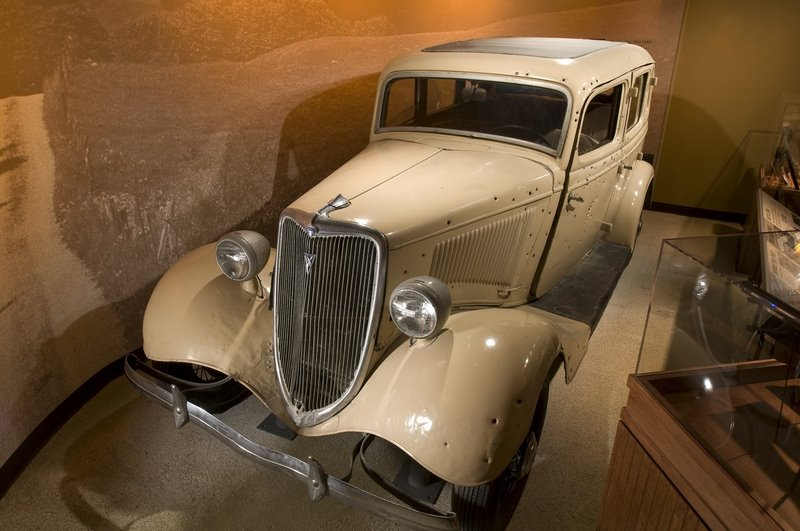
A replica, made for the film, of the Ford V8 in which Bonnie and Clyde died, is on display at the Alcatraz East museum

Bonnie and Clyde has been cited as a major influence for such disparate films as The Wild Bunch, The Godfather, The Departed, Queen & Slim, True Romance, and Natural Born Killers.

== In popular culture ==
The "Storage Jars" skit of episode 33 of Monty Python's Flying Circus features a brief still shot of Beatty as Clyde firing a Thompson submachine gun as he escapes from the Red Crown Tourist Court.

== See also ==
- List of American films of 1967
- Heist film
