= Dan Biggers =

American actor (1931–2011)

- Born: January 18, 1931; Newton County, Georgia, US
- Died: December 5, 2011 (aged 80); Rome, Georgia, US
- Occupations: College administrator, actor
- Years active: 1982–2005

Daniel Upshaw Biggers (January 18, 1931 – December 5, 2011) was an American college administrator and actor best known for his role as Dr. Frank Robb on the television series In the Heat of the Night.

== Biography ==
Biggers was born on January 18, 1931, in Newton County, Georgia. He was an English instructor at Toccoa High School in the late 1950s. In 1963, he became headmaster of Thornwood (Darlington Lower School) in Rome, Georgia. Beginning in 1967, he was dean of students at Berry College. A student uprising overtook the campus security team during his tenure as dean of students. Prior to Darlington School he had been on the staff of Dean Tate, Dean of Men at the University of Georgia and escorted Charlayne Hunter (now a correspondent for PBS) to class when she integrated the University of Georgia in 1960. From 1976 until his retirement in 1996, he was the director of Oak Hill and the Martha Berry Museum. He was also on the board of directors of the Greater Rome Convention and Visitors Bureau for 13 years and helped develop the Northwest Georgia Travel Association. In 1983, he was awarded the Phoenix Award for conservation and preservation by the Society of American Travel Writers.

Biggers' acting career began with the Rome Little Theatre, where he won several acting awards. His first television appearance was in Maid in America in 1962 and his last in Elizabethtown in 2005. His breakout role was in The Slugger's Wife in 1985. He played "Doc" Robb on In the Heat of the Night for eight years. He was awarded a lifetime achievement award by the Rome International Film Festival and also by the Georgia Screen Actors Guild.

In 1997, Biggers portrayed Harry Cram in the Clint Eastwood-directed screenplay of John Berendt's best-selling book Midnight in the Garden of Good and Evil.

Biggers died on December 5, 2011, aged 80, in Rome, Georgia.
