= In the Heat of the Night (Ray Charles song) =

1967 song by Ray Charles

"In the Heat of the Night" is a 1967 song performed by Ray Charles, composed by Quincy Jones, and written by Marilyn Bergman and Alan Bergman for the film In the Heat of the Night. As Matthew Greenwald of AllMusic states, the song "opens the film and accompanying soundtrack with a slice of real, rural backwoods gospel. Lyrically, one of the key lines is 'In the heat of the night/I'm feeling motherless somehow,' which clearly illustrates the main character's dilemma of being in the wrong place at the wrong time. The main melody is guided by Charles' funky piano work and is buttressed by then-session ace Billy Preston's powerful, soulful organ trills. The underlying sense of drama that is so much a part of the film is reflected perfectly in this song, and the Ray Charles Singers add to this with a stately grace. It's perfect listening for a midsummer night when the temperature is just a bit too hot for comfort."

Released as a single by ABC Records, Charles' version of the song reached #33 on the Billboard Hot 100 chart and #21 on the Hot Rhythm & Blues Singles chart. The song was also released on the soundtrack album on United Artists in 1967.

For the 1988–95 television series of the same name, the song was recorded by Bill Champlin.
