= Quentin Dean =

American actress (1944-2003)

- Born: July 27, 1944
- Died: May 7, 2003 (aged 58); Los Angeles, California, U.S.
- Occupation: Actress
- Years active: 1967–1969

Quentin Dean (July 27, 1944 – May 7, 2003) was an American actress in the late 1960s.

== Career ==
Dean played 16-year-old temptress Delores Purdy in Norman Jewison's 1967 hit film In the Heat of the Night, starring Sidney Poitier, for which she was nominated for a Golden Globe for Best Supporting Actress. Her acting career ended in 1969 on an episode of Lancer.

== Death ==
At the age of 58, she died of cancer in Los Angeles, California. Her remains were cremated, and her ashes were scattered in the Pacific Ocean.

== Filmography ==
Film
Year	Title	Role	Notes
1967	In the Heat of the Night	Delores Purdy	
1968	The Young Runaways	Jennie	
1968	Stay Away, Joe	Mamie Callahan	
1968	Will Penny	Jennie	
Television
Year	Title	Role	Notes
1967	Judd for the Defense	Lou Ann Bender	1 episode
1967	The Big Valley	Bettina	1 episode
1968	The Virginian	Saranora	1 episode
1969	The Mod Squad	Sally	1 episode
1969	The F.B.I.	Elaine Donner	1 episode
1969	The High Chaparral	Sarah	1 episode
1969	Lancer	Lucrece	1 episode (final appearance)
