= Eldon Quick =

American character actor (born 1937)

- Born: April 4, 1937 (age 89); San Joaquin County, California, U.S.
- Occupations: Film and television actor

Eldon Maroney Quick (born April 4, 1937) is an American character actor. He is an alumnus of the American Shakespeare Festival and has numerous stage, screen, and television roles to his credit.

== Life and career ==
Quick's debut as a professional actor came at the American Shakespeare Festival in Stratford, Connecticut.

Quick's best-remembered television character is the bureaucratic Captain Sloan from two early episodes of M*A*S*H ("Payday" and "The Incubator"), which he reprised as Captain Pratt in "The Late Captain Pierce". Quick also played scheming magazine editor Rob Roy Fingerhead in an episode of The Monkees, and the villain Chronos in the final episode of Buck Rogers in the 25th Century.

Quick appeared in a Bewitched episode, "Samantha's Secret Saucer", as Captain Tugwell. Eldon Quick also appeared in the show Barnaby Jones; episode titled, "To Catch a Dead Man"(02/04/1973).

His film roles include Charlie Hawthorne in In the Heat of the Night, William Harper Littlejohn in Doc Savage: The Man of Bronze, and Reverend Lowell in The Big Bet.

== Filmography ==
Year	Title	Role	Notes
1967	In the Heat of the Night	Charles Hawthorne	
1969	Viva Max!	Quincy	
1974	Homebodies	Insurance Inspector	
1975	How Come Nobody's on Our Side?	Hal the Cop	
1975	Doc Savage: The Man of Bronze	Johnny	
1985	The Big Bet	Rev. Lowell	

== Television ==
Year	Title	Role	Notes
1967	The Monkees	Rob Roy	S1:E24, "Monkees a la Mode"
1967	Chrysler Theatre		"Deadlock"
1973	M*A*S*H	Captain Sloan	S2:E12, "The Incubator"
