= James Richard =

Sound Editor

- Born: April 29, 1928
- Died: October 25, 2002 (aged 74)
- Other names: Jim Richard; James A. Richards; James A. Richard
- Occupation: Sound editor
- Years active: 1956–1973

James A. Richard (April 29, 1928 – October 25, 2002) was a sound editor.

He was nominated for a Best Sound Editing at the 1967 Academy Awards for In the Heat of the Night. He also did sound editing on a few episodes of Honey West and Fury. He died in 2002.

== Selected filmography ==
- Jonathan Livingston Seagull (1973) (as Jim Richard)
- Harold and Maude (1971) (as James A. Richards)
- Little Big Man (1970) (as James A. Richard)
- Gaily, Gaily (1969) (as James A. Richard)
- The Thomas Crown Affair (1968)
- In the Heat of the Night (1967)
- Ship of Fools (1965)
- Taras Bulba (1962)
- The Giant Gila Monster (1959)
