= John Ball (novelist) =

American novelist

John Dudley Ball, Jr.
- Born: 8 July 1911; Schenectady, New York, U.S.
- Died: October 15, 1988 (aged 77); Encino, California, U.S.
- Education: Carroll College
- Occupations: writer, police officer

John Dudley Ball Jr. (July 8, 1911 – October 15, 1988) was an American writer best known for mystery novels involving the African-American police detective Virgil Tibbs. Tibbs was introduced in the 1965 novel In the Heat of the Night, which won the Edgar Award for Best First Novel from the Mystery Writers of America and was made into an Oscar-winning film of the same name, starring Sidney Poitier and Rod Steiger.

== Life ==
Ball was born in Schenectady, New York, grew up in Milwaukee, Wisconsin, and attended Carroll College in Waukesha, Wisconsin. He wrote for a number of magazines and newspapers, including the Brooklyn Eagle. For a time he worked as a part-time reserve deputy for the Los Angeles County Sheriff's Office, was trained in martial arts, and was a nudist. In the mid-1980s, he was the book review columnist for Mike Shayne Mystery Magazine. Ball lived in Encino, California, and died there in 1988. He was a member of the exclusive The Baker Street Irregulars, a society of ardent Sherlock Holmes fans. He was invested in the BSI in 1960 as "The Oxford Flier."

Ball's Last Plane Out consists of two stories which share characters and then meld together. The first involves a group of travelers in a troubled Third World country, waiting for the last plane out, which they hope will carry them to safety. The second story is shared by an aviation buff who is given his chance to increase his flying skills by the airline that has been built by the pilot of the first story.

He died in 1988 and was buried at the Forest Lawn, Hollywood Hills Cemetery in Los Angeles.

== Magic ==
While in college he performed as a semi-professional magician under the name "Jacques Morintell" and "Howduzi". He was listed in the "Who's Who in Magic" in the May 1933 issue of The Sphinx: An Independent Magazine for Magicians published from March 1902 through March 1953) and contributed an article called "Further Ideas" to The Sphinx in 1937.

== Bibliography ==
=== Virgil Tibbs series ===
Novels

- In the Heat of the Night, Harper & Row Publishers, 1965
- The Cool Cottontail, Harper & Row Publishers, 1966
- Johnny Get Your Gun, Little, Brown, 1969 ISBN 0316079456
  - Republished as Death for a Playmate, Bantam 1972.
- Five Pieces of Jade, 1972
- The Eyes of Buddha, Little, Brown, 1976.
- Then Came Violence, Doubleday, 1980. ISBN 0385157266
- Singapore, Dodd, Mead, 1986, ISBN 0396087639

Short stories

- "One for Virgil Tibbs" (Ellery Queen's Mystery Magazine, Feb 1976)
- "Virgil Tibbs and the Cocktail Napkin" (Ellery Queen's Mystery Magazine, Apr 1977)
- "Virgil Tibbs and the Fallen Body" (Ellery Queen's Mystery Magazine, Sep 1978)
- "Good Evening Mr. Tibbs" (published in Murder California Style, 1987)

=== Others ===
- Operation Springboard (aka Operation Space); Duell, Sloan and Pearce; 1958.
- Judo Boy; Duell, Sloan and Pearce; 1964.
- Rescue Mission, Harper & Row, 1966.
- Arctic Showdown: an Alaskan Adventure, 1966.
- Miss One Thousand Spring Blossoms, 1968.
- Last Plane Out, 1970.
- The First Team, Little, Brown and Company; ISBN 0-316-07947-2, 1971
- The Fourteenth Point, Little, Brown and Company, ISBN 0-316-07949-9, 1973.
- Mark One: The Dummy, 1974.
- The Winds of Mitamura, 1975.
- Phase Three Alert; Little, Brown & Company; ISBN 0316079375, 1977.
- Police Chief, 1977.
- A Killing in the Market, Doubleday and Company, 1978.
- The Mystery Story (edited), Penguin Books; ISBN 0140050566, 1978.
- The Murder Children, 1979.
- Trouble for Tallon, 1981.
- Chief Tallon and the S.O.R., 1984.
- Murder California Style (edited), 1987.
- The Kiwi Target, 1988.
- The Van: A Tale of Terror, 1989 (released posthumously).
