= Oklahoma City bombing conspiracy theories =

Conspiracy theories surrounding the 1995 terrorist attack

Alternative theories have been proposed regarding the Oklahoma City bombing in 1995. These theories reject all, or part of, the official government report. Some of these theories focus on the possibility of additional co-conspirators alongside Timothy McVeigh and Terry Nichols that were never indicted or additional explosives planted inside the Alfred P. Murrah Federal Building. Other theories allege that employees, including US president Bill Clinton, knew of the impending bombing and intentionally failed to act on that knowledge. Further theories allege that the bombing was perpetrated by government forces to frame and stigmatize the militia movement, which had grown following the controversial federal handlings of the Ruby Ridge and Waco incidents, and regain public support. Government investigations have been opened at various times to look into the theories.

== Overview ==
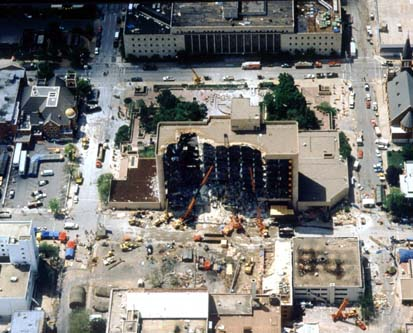
The bombing of the Alfred P. Murrah Federal Building in Oklahoma City was one of the deadliest acts of terrorism in American history.

At 9:02 a.m. CST, on April 19, 1995, a Ryder rental truck containing more than 6,200 pounds (2,800 kg) of ammonium nitrate fertilizer, nitromethane, and diesel fuel mixture was detonated in front of the north side of the nine-story Alfred P. Murrah Federal Building. The attack claimed 168 lives and left over 600 people injured.

Shortly after the explosion, Oklahoma State Trooper Charlie Hanger stopped 26-year-old Timothy McVeigh for driving a 1977 Mercury sedan without a license plate and arrested him for that offense and for unlawfully carrying a weapon. Within days, McVeigh's old army friend Terry Nichols was arrested and both men were charged with committing the bombing. Investigators determined that they were sympathizers of a militia movement and that their motive was to retaliate against the government's handling of the Waco and Ruby Ridge incidents (the bombing occurred on the second anniversary of the Waco incident). McVeigh was executed by lethal injection on June 11, 2001 while Nichols was sentenced to life in prison.

Although the indictment against McVeigh and Nichols alleged that they conspired with "others unknown to the grand jury", prosecutors, and later McVeigh himself, said the bombing was solely the work of McVeigh and Nichols. In this scenario, the two obtained fertilizer and other explosive materials over a period of months and then assembled the bomb in Kansas the day prior to its detonation. After assembly, McVeigh allegedly drove the truck alone to Oklahoma City, lit the fuse, and fled in a getaway car he had parked in the area days prior.

== Speculations related to John Doe #2 ==
Several witnesses reported seeing a second person with McVeigh around the time of the bombing, whom investigators later called "John Doe 2". In 1997, the FBI arrested Michael Brescia, a member of Aryan Republican Army, who resembled an artist's rendering of John Doe 2 based on the eyewitness accounts. However, they later released him, reporting that their investigation had indicated he was not involved with the bombing. One reporter for The Washington Post reflected on the fact that a John Doe 2 has never been found: "Maybe he'll (John Doe 2) be captured and convicted someday. If not, he'll remain eternally at large, the one who got away, the mystery man at the center of countless conspiracy theories. It's possible that he never lived. It's likely that he'll never die."

There has also been speculation that an unmatched leg found at the bombing site may have belonged to the alleged unidentified, additional bomber. It was claimed that this bomber was either in the building when the bombing occurred, or had previously been murdered, and McVeigh had left his body in the back of the Ryder truck to hide it in the explosion.

Nichols specifically alluded to other conspirators in 2006 declaration: "There are others who assisted McVeigh whose identifies are unknown to me," but Nichols also identified two "co-conspirators". In addition to unknown persons, Nichols believed Andreas Strassmeir was an agent provocateur, and FBI agent Larry A. Potts was involved in the bombing plot. Nichols went on to deny any connection to terrorist groups in the Philippines. The FBI did not reply to media requests for comment on Nichols' allegation.

== Additional explosives ==
One theory contends there was a cover-up of the existence of additional explosives planted within the Murrah building. The theory focuses on the local news channels reporting the existence of a second and third bomb within the first few hours of the explosion. Theorists point to nearby seismographs that recorded two tremors from the bombing, believing it to indicate two bombs had been used. Experts dispute this, stating that the first tremor was a result of the bomb, while the second tremor was due to the collapse of the building.

Conspiracy theorists say that there are several discrepancies, such as a proposed inconsistency between the observed destruction and the bomb used by McVeigh. Physicist Samuel T. Cohen, known as the primary inventor of the neutron bomb, stated in a letter to an Oklahoma politician that he did not believe a fertilizer bomb was capable of causing the destruction at the Murrah building. Similarly, Air Force Brigadier General Benton K. Partin expressed an opinion that there must have been additional explosive charges inside the Murrah building.

== Allegations of support ==
=== Far-right ===
Carol Howe, an informant for the Department of Alcohol, Tobacco and Firearms who had infiltrated the white supremacist enclave Elohim City, Oklahoma, filed a report in January 1995 stating that Andreas Strassmeir, Elohim City's security chief, had spoken about destroying a Federal building and had visited the Murrah building with another man. Two days after the bombing, Howe reminded the ATF of the earlier report and urged investigation into a possible connection to Elohim City. McVeigh is known to have telephoned Elohim City two weeks before the bombing. Jane Graham, a Housing and Urban Development employee at the Murrah building who survived the bombing, later stated that in the days before the bombing she had observed multiple suspicious persons who she suspected may have been involved (such as unfamiliar persons in maintenance or military uniforms), but that her observations were ignored by authorities. Graham later identified one of these men as Andreas Strassmeir of Elohim City.

=== US federal government ===
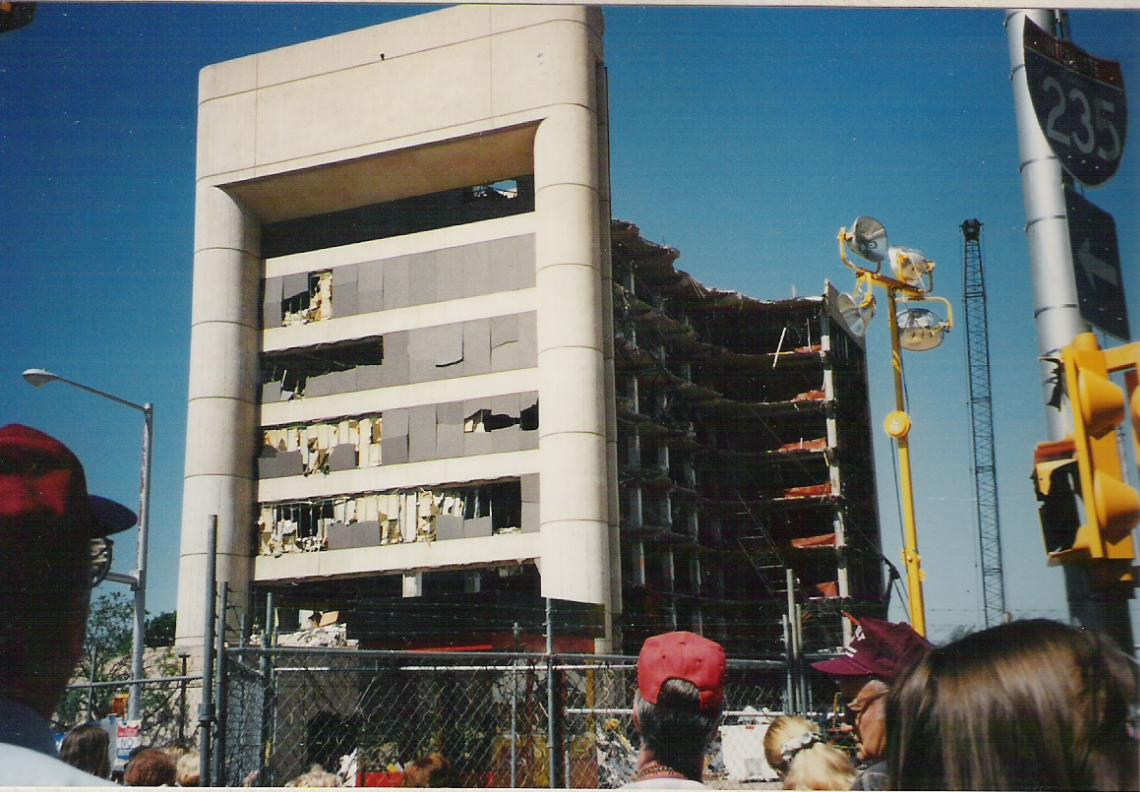
Murrah Building during the recovery effort

Another theory alleged that President Bill Clinton had either known about the bombing in advance or had approved the bombing. It is also believed that the bombing was done by the government to frame the militia movement or enact antiterrorism legislation while using McVeigh as a scapegoat. Still other theories claim that McVeigh conspired with the CIA in plotting the bombing.

In a 1993 letter to his sister, published by The New York Times in 1998, McVeigh claimed that during his time at Fort Bragg he and nine others were recruited into a secret black ops team that smuggled drugs into the United States to fund covert activities and "were to work hand-in-hand with civilian police agencies to quiet anyone whom was deemed a security risk. (We would be gov't-paid assassins!)" In a 2001 declaration Terry Nichols, McVeigh's convicted co-conspirator, also alleged that McVeigh reported in December 1992 how he "had been recruited to carry out undercover missions"^{Paragraph 10} which initially involved visiting gun shows and making contact with a loose network of anti-government and far-right sympathizers. This undercover activity allegedly escalated to armed robberies and a planned bombing under the direction of FBI agent Larry A. Potts.^{Paragraph 33} David Paul Hammer, a convicted murderer in the same facility as McVeigh for about two years, reported that McVeigh stated similar allegations to him: that McVeigh was an "undercover operative" for the Department of Defense, and that Andreas Strassmeir was a similar operative but with "a different handler" and they had worked together in planning the bombing.

=== Middle Eastern ===
There are several theories that McVeigh and Nichols had a possible foreign connection or co-conspirators. This was because Terry Nichols traveled through the Philippines while Ramzi Yousef, who committed the 1993 World Trade Center bombing, was planning his Bojinka plot in Manila. Ramzi Yousef placed the bomb used in the 1993 World Trade Center bombing inside a rented Ryder van, the same rental company used by McVeigh, indicating a possible foreign link to Al-Qaeda. Other theories link McVeigh with Islamic terrorists, the Japanese government, and German neo-Nazis.

The Third Terrorist: The Middle East Connection to the Oklahoma City Bombing by journalist Jayna Davis about evidence of Oklahoma City bombing was published in April 2004 by Nelson Current Publishers, and became a New York Times best-seller. The Justice Department initially sought, but then abandoned its search for, a Middle East suspect. In contrast to conspiracy theories that the bombing was a false flag attack perpetrated by elements of the US government or white supremacists in Elohim City, the book presents a theory that links the Oklahoma City bombers to agents of Iraq and Al-Qaeda, operating under Iranian state sponsorship.

== Investigations ==
In 2006, US Congressman Dana Rohrabacher said that the Subcommittee on Oversight and Investigations of the U.S. House Committee on International Relations, which he chaired, would investigate whether the Oklahoma City bombers had assistance from foreign sources. On December 28, 2006, when asked about fueling conspiracy theories with his questions and criticism, Rohrabacher told CNN: "There's nothing wrong with adding to a conspiracy theory when there might be a conspiracy, in fact." Among other unresolved questions, Rohrabacher also criticized the FBI for not explaining how Nichols, who did not work steadily, paid for his several trips to the Philippines and had $20,000 cash; for not finding explosives concealed in Nichols's house until a decade after the bombing; for not explaining the "rush to rule out the existence of John Doe Number 2"; and for not thoroughly investigating possible connections between McVeigh and the Aryan Republican Army and Andreas Strassmeir. In March 2007, Danny Coulson, who served as deputy assistant director of FBI at the time of attacks, voiced his concerns and called for reopening of investigation.

On September 28, 2009, Jesse Trentadue, a Salt Lake City attorney, released security tapes that he obtained from the FBI through the Freedom of Information Act that show the Murrah building before and after the blast from four security cameras. The tapes are blank at points before 9:02 am, the time of detonation. Trentadue said that the government's explanation for the missing footage is that the tape was being replaced at the time. Said Trentadue, "Four cameras in four different locations going blank at the same time on the morning of April 19, 1995. There ain't no such thing as a coincidence." Trentadue became interested in the case when his brother, Kenneth Michael Trentadue, died in federal custody, during what Trentadue believes was an interrogation because Kenneth was mistaken for a possible conspirator in the Oklahoma City bombing. In a civil suit, the court determined Trentadue's injuries could have been self-inflicted and rejected the Trentadue family claim that he was murdered. However, the family was awarded $1.1 million for emotional distress on the findings the Bureau of Prisons mismanaged the investigation and aftermath of Trentadue's death.

In November 2014, John R. Schindler, a former professor at the Naval War College and National Security Agency intelligence officer, wrote "It would be good if a serious re-look at OKBOMB’s many unanswered questions were established for the event", because of "the existence of important evidence indicating there’s something we should be talking about". He stated that when he participated in a reexamination by the United States Intelligence Community after the September 11 attacks of possible foreign involvement with recent terrorist attacks, he found "as Rohrabacher’s investigators did a few years later, that the FBI and DoJ had no interest in anyone peeking into the case, which they considered closed, indeed tightly shut. Even in Top Secret channels, avenues were blocked". While cautioning that the bombing "has attracted more than its share of charlatans and self-styled experts, some of whom are eager to pin the bombing on Arabs, Masons, Jews, and perhaps space aliens", Schindler urged a resumption of Rohrabacher's investigation and cited two issues as notable: McVeigh's and Nichols's visits to the Philippines, and the activities of a German national and friend of McVeigh.

== See also ==
- Arlington Road
- List of terrorist incidents
- Lone wolf (terrorism)
- 1941 Pearl Harbor advance-knowledge conspiracy theory
- 1962 Operation Northwoods; 1956-1990 Operation Gladio; etc.
- 1963 John F. Kennedy assassination conspiracy theories
- 1964 Gulf of Tonkin incident
- 1994 AMIA bombing
- 1995 Oklahoma City bombing
  - 1995 Oklahoma City bombing conspiracy theories
  - The Third Terrorist: The Middle East Connection to the Oklahoma City Bombing, a non-fiction book
  - Richard Snell, CSA member executed on April 19, 1995.
- 1999 Columbine High School massacre
- 1999+ Able Danger
- 2001 Shijiazhuang bombings
- September 11 attacks
  - 9/11 Truth movement
  - 9/11 conspiracy theories
  - Opinion polls about 9/11 conspiracy theories
  - Osama bin Laden death conspiracy theories
  - Operation Terror, a 2012 thriller film fictionalizing 9/11
- 2004 Madrid train bombings controversies
- 2005 London July bombings conspiracy theories
- 2011 Norway attacks
- 2012 Sandy Hook Elementary School shooting conspiracy theories, people who thought the school shooting was a false flag government attack
- False flag
