= Dennis Mahon =

American right-wing militant

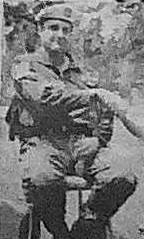
- Mahon in 1988
- Born: August 29, 1950 (age 76); Davis Junction, Illinois, U.S.
- Occupation: Aircraft mechanic
- Organization(s): White Aryan Resistance, National Alliance (formerly), Ku Klux Klan (formerly)
- Known for: Oklahoma City bombing conspiracy theories and the 2004 Office of Diversity and Dialogue mail bombing in Scottsdale, Arizona.
- Title: Imperial Wizard (formerly)
- Movement: Neo-Nazi, white supremacist
- Status: Incarcerated
- Criminal charges: conspiracy to damage buildings and property by means of explosives, malicious damage of a building by means of explosives, distribution of information related to explosives
- Penalty: 40 years in prison

Dennis William Mahon (born August 29, 1950) is an American far-right militant who is part of the radical white supremacist movement. He was indicted for the 2004 Office of Diversity and Dialogue mail bombing in Scottsdale, Arizona. Mahon is currently incarcerated at FCI Oxford.

== Early life ==
On August 29, 1950, Dennis Mahon was born alongside his identical twin brother, Daniel Wallace Mahon, in Illinois. He also claims to have served in the U.S. Army during the Vietnam War. (Note: Journalist Molly Conger noted while sources often repeat Mahon's claims of Vietnam War service, there are no public records of him serving.)

== White supremacist activism ==
The Mahon twins first got involved in white supremacist activism in the 1970s when they joined the Knights of the Ku Klux Klan. Mahon claimed that he was inspired to join the Klan after he had read The Turner Diaries during a time when he was working as an aircraft mechanic in Florida. He also joined the National Alliance in 1980. Journalist Molly Conger notes he was likely further radicalized while working as a member of the Florida National Guard during the Mariel boatlift, which Mahon frequently discussed negatively.

He told The Oklahoman he was involved in "underground, terroristic activities" for the Klan from 1980 to 1987. While Mahon was not charged for any activities during this time, he claimed on wiretapped calls to have set off pipe bombs and destroyed transformers.

Mahon published The White Beret newsletter from around 1989 to 1995, but only the December 1991-January 1992 issue has survived into the 21st century.

=== Klansas City Kable ===
In 1987, Mahon was the "King Klegal," or regional manager, of the Missouri Knights of the Ku Klux Klan. The next year he formed a splinter group, the White Knights of the Ku Klux Klan. In January 1988, he began work on getting a Klan television show on Kansas City Public Television. The city refused to air Tom Metzger's Race and Reason show because it was not produced in their studios. By summer, the Kansas City City Council voted to shut down the city's public television channel to prevent the airing of Mahon's Klan television show, but the American Civil Liberties Union sued on behalf of the Klan. Mahon, Metzger, and his attorney appeared on the September 1, 1988, episode of The Oprah Winfrey Show where they debated the Kansas City Public Television controversy with C. T. Vivian, Emanuel Cleaver, and an Orthodox rabbi. In the summer of 1989 the city settled by reinstating the channel and paid $97,000 to Mahon. One episode of Klansas City Kable aired on April 3, 1990. 19 klansmen were arrested during the filming of the episode after one pulled a gun on a Black passerby.

In 1989 Mahon unsuccessfully ran for alderman in Northmoor, Missouri, on a platform of keeping the community white. In October 1990, his Klan group handed out a Klan hotline phone number at Kansas City elementary and middle schools. The hotlines played the theme song for Mister Rogers' Neighborhood followed by a Klansman pretending to be Fred Rogers while making homophobic and racist remarks. Rogers sued for copyright infringement over the use of his theme song and Mahon signed the settlement agreement on behalf of the Klan. The agreement required the destruction of all copies of the Klan's hotline recording.

=== Move to Oklahoma ===
By 1990, Mahon had moved to Tulsa, Oklahoma, where he was the Imperial Dragon of the local Ku Klux Klan. Journalist Molly Conger calls Mahon Tom Metzger's "midwest lieutenant." He built ties between local white power skinhead groups, the Ku Klux Klan, Aryan Nation, and White Aryan Resistance in Oklahoma during early 1990s. By 1991, he was suspected of spreading white supremacist fliers and graffiti at Memorial High School.

In 1990, a white power skinhead in Germany began writing Mahon and republishing his The White Beret newsletter in German as The Fiery Cross. The next year, travelled to Germany in an attempt to recruit members for the American KKK. During his stay in the country, he led a cross burning ceremony with 60 neo-Nazis in an area southeast of Berlin. Mahon claimed he encouraged German recruits to firebomb buildings occupied by foreigners and that he trained them in guerilla warfare. He held the rally during the Hoyerswerda riots.

In 1991 Mahon held a rally in Tulsa in support of the then-president of Iraq Saddam Hussein and to protest the ongoing Persian Gulf War. Mahon would later claim that he had received funding directly from the Iraqi government.

By 1992, he was reported to have left the Klan in order to become affiliated with Tom Metzger's White Aryan Resistance. Mahon felt that the Klan had gotten too moderate and he also felt that the Klan's membership was full of informants and low-quality recruits.

In 1992, Mahon ran to be the mayor of Tulsa. He ran as a Republican, but the local party denounced his candidacy. 54 candidates appeared on the ballot and Mahon received 186 votes, or 0.2%.

In 1993, Mahon travelled to Canada on behalf of Metzger but he was deported back to America shortly after he arrived in Canada because Canadian authorities claimed that he was a threat.

In 1998, Mahon ran to be the mayor of Tulsa again. He placed 4th in a 6 candidate Republican primary with 731 votes, or 5.6%.

== Alleged ties to the Oklahoma City bombing ==
Starting in 1992, Mahon is known to have been a frequent visitor to the white separatist community Elohim City. According to Mahon himself, he stated that he resided there for approximately four years and kept an Airstream trailer parked there, before leaving in August 1995. During this time, he also began taking his then-girlfriend, Carol Howe, to the compound.

While working as an informant for the ATF, Carol Howe reported that Mahon, along with Andreas Strassmeir, discussed "targeting federal installations for destruction," such as the Tulsa IRS Office, the Tulsa Federal Building, and the Oklahoma City Federal Building.

Mahon was called to appear before a grand jury in Tulsa, Oklahoma in July 1997 and was to answer questions in relation to the bombing. Mahon did appear but did not answer any of the questions he was asked about the bombing. One witness claimed to have seen Mahon sitting next to Timothy McVeigh in the Ryder truck that contained the bomb used in the attack around 30 minutes before the explosion. However, phone records and other witnesses later showed that Mahon was in Illinois on the day of the bombing.

In a 2001 interview with Jon Ronson, Mahon acknowledged meeting McVeigh at a Tulsa gunshow and praised his actions, but denied involvement in the bombing. He did however accuse Strassmeir of being involved in the bombing. In a later interview in 2007 with a National Geographic reporter, Mahon once again praised McVeigh for his actions. He also promoted conspiracy theories of Irish Republican Army involvement in the bombing.

== 2004 Scottsdale Office of Diversity mail bombing ==
2004 Scottsdale Office of Diversity mail bombing
- Location: Office of Diversity and Inclusion in Scottsdale, Arizona
- Date: February 26, 2004
- Attack type: Domestic terrorism Letter bombing
- Weapon: Pipe bomb
- Deaths: 0
- Injuries: 3
- Perpetrator: Dennis Mahon
- Motive: Hate crime Ethnically-motivated terrorism

=== The bombing ===
On February 26, 2004, Scottsdale's Office of Diversity and Dialogue received a package in a cardboard box addressed to Don Logan, the office's director. The package contained a bomb which exploded in Logan's hands, as well as a letter demanding Logan "cease and desist his corrupt activities." Mahon's goal was to end the office of diversity's work, which he considered "corrupt." Logan and an assistant were seriously injured, while another office worker received less severe injuries. The Mahon brothers quickly became suspects as they had attended a white power rock festival a few weeks prior to the gathering and Mahon had called the office and left a threatening voice mail a few months prior to bombing.

=== Investigation ===
While investigating Dennis and Daniel Mahon for involvement in the mail bombing, the Bureau of Alcohol, Tobacco, Firearms and Explosives recruited ex-stripper Rebecca "Becca" Williams as an investigative informant. Williams moved into the same trailer park as the Mahon twins and struck a friendship with them. She worked over time to win their trust. Williams was nicknamed the "Trailer Park Mata Hari". Mahon was recorded bragging to Williams that he had committed the bombing of the Scottsdale office and several other bombings of an abortion clinic, a Jewish community center, and offices of the IRS and immigration authorities.

After a five-year undercover federal investigation, the Mahon brothers were arrested at their Illinois home in 2009 for the connection to the 2004 Office of Diversity and Dialogue mail bombing. After the Mahons were arrested, the homes of Metzger and a Powell, Missouri affiliate named Robert Joos were raided.

=== Trial and Conviction ===
The jury found Dennis Mahon guilty for the bombing, but found his brother, Daniel Mahon, not guilty. He was convicted for conspiracy to damage buildings and property by means of explosives, malicious damage of a building by means of explosives, distribution of information related to explosives and sentenced to 40 years in prison.

On February 11, 2025, the Scottsdale City Council voted to 5–2 to close the city's diversity office. Journalist Molly Conger criticized the decision as a fulfillment of Mahon's wishes. Logan referenced the bombing during public comments at the meeting saying "an anti-diversity extremist who I never talked to, never knew, attacked me and my colleagues because of what we represent."

== Electoral history ==
1992 Tulsa Mayoral special election
Party	Candidate	Votes	%	±%
Democratic	Susan Savage	37,605	40.6%	
Republican	Dewey F. Bartlett Jr.	20,646	22.5%	
Republican	Dick Crawford	11,913	12.9%	
Democratic	Joe Williams	9,149	9.2%	
Democratic	James Hogue Sr.	7,806	8.5%	
Republican	Tom Quinn	1,522	1.7%	
Republican	Larry C. Hovis	482	0.5%	
Republican	Bob Kaczmarek	286	0.3%	
Republican	Lawrence D. Randall	244	0.3%	
Republican	John F. Loerch	209	.2%	
Democratic	Barbara Kochevar Clark	197	0.2%	
Republican	Dennis W. Mahon	186	0.2%	
Republican	Sandra Ruffin	174	0.2%	
Republican	Joe Jones	160	0.2%	
Democratic	Rocky Frisco	159	0.2%	
Democratic	Susan Town	128	0.1%	
Republican	Robert D. Ward	117	0.1%	
Democratic	William D. Reif	111	.1%	
Republican	Dave Cuenod Jr.	103	0.1%	
Republican	Linda Spalding	94	0.1%	
Democratic	Anthony R. Coleman Sr.	93	0.1%	
Democratic	Lawrence F. Kirkpatrick	89	0.1%	
Democratic	Rick Blackburn	86	0.1%	
Republican	Ted C. Talbert	72	0.1%	
Democratic	James F. Carrigan	70	0.1%	
Republican	Shelley D. McNeill	70	0.1%	
Democratic	Chris T. Hartline	63	0.1%	
Republican	Bob Looney	53	0.1%	
Republican	Steven W. Kopet	51	0.1%	
Republican	Charles R. Doty	49	0.1%	
Democratic	Les D. Ecker	49	0.1%	
Republican	William Neill Wilbanks	48	0.1%	
Democratic	Kenneth Ray Thompson	47	0.1%	
Republican	Jim Ed Briggs	46	0.1%	
Democratic	Michael Luc Provencher	43	0.1%	
Democratic	Michael S. Crabbe	42	0.04%	
Republican	David Ferree	42	0.04%	
Democratic	Phillip Leon Hamilton	41	0.04%	
Republican	Richard C. Bevins Jr.	38	0.04%	
Democratic	Douglas A. Casada	38	0.04%	
Democratic	Josh Martin	37	0.04%	
Republican	Robert E. Fearon	34	0.04%	
Democratic	Dan O'Rourke Jr.	34	0.04%	
Republican	Brad A. Pfeiffer	32	0.04%	
Republican	Timothy A. Fisher	29	0.03%	
Republican	Darein W. Gandall	28	0.03%	
Republican	Richard E. Brooks	26	0.03%	
Republican	Brad Jensen	26	0.03%	
Republican	Monty Dale Davidson	23	0.03%	
Democratic	Robert E. Dumont	22	0.02%	
Republican	Curtis W. Gilling	22	0.02%	
Republican	J. David Weatherman	22	0.02%	
Republican	Gary Johns	21	0.02%	
Republican	Rick R. J. Hart	17	0.02%	
Total votes		92794	100.00%	
