= Kenneth Michael Trentadue =

American citizen

- Born: December 19, 1950
- Died: August 21, 1995 (aged 44); Federal Transfer Center, Oklahoma City
- Other name: Kenny
- Occupation: Construction
- Known for: Oklahoma City bombing conspiracy theories

Kenneth Michael Trentadue (December 19, 1950 – August 21, 1995) was an American citizen who was found hanged in his cell at Federal Transfer Center, Oklahoma City during the investigation of the Oklahoma City bombing. His death was officially ruled a suicide three years after it occurred. Trentadue's family maintains that he was murdered by members of the FBI who mistakenly believed he was involved in the Oklahoma bombing and that officials at the prison engaged in a cover-up. Oklahoma City's chief medical examiner said it was "very likely he was murdered". Convicted bomber Timothy McVeigh stated that he believed Trentadue was mistaken for Richard Lee Guthrie, a suspected co-conspirator in the bombing who also died in federal custody, allegedly from suicide by hanging.

== Early life ==
Kenneth Trentadue was born to a family of coal miners and raised in Number 7, a coal camp located between Cucumber, West Virginia, and Horsepen, Virginia. In 1961, when the coal business was facing hard times, Kenneth moved with his family to Orange County, California. In high school, despite being an accomplished track and field athlete, Kenneth dropped out. He enlisted in the army and soon developed an addiction to heroin. He attempted to find a job doing factory work and carpentry, but eventually turned to robbing banks with a fake gun. He was subsequently caught, and served 6 years of a 20 year sentence before being released on parole in 1988. Subsequently, Trentadue married and became legitimately employed in construction. On June 19, 1995, his first child was born, a son named Vito.

== Arrest and death ==
Kenneth was apprehended on June 10, 1995, nearly two months after the Oklahoma City bombing, while crossing the border from Mexico into California. Police officers ran his driver's license and discovered that he was wanted for violating his parole. On August 18, Trentadue was transferred to the Department of Justice's Federal Transfer Center in Oklahoma City. Trentadue called his brother, Jesse, from FTC Oklahoma on August 19. Jesse described Kenneth as sounding "chipper" in the call.

District Judge Timothy D. Leonard would later write that during a check of Kenneth's cell at 2:38 a.m. on August 21, 1995, all was normal with no sign of blood or a suicide attempt; thus Trentadue's injuries and hanging occurred "in quite a short period of time" of 24 minutes or less According to prison records, at 3:02 a.m., the morning of August 21, 1995, Kenneth was found in his cell suspended from a noose made out of his bed sheets.

Oklahoma County District Attorney Bob Macy and federal officials determined that Trentadue had committed suicide by hanging himself. Investigative journalist James Ridgeway wrote that authorities "would later put forth an elaborate scenario in which Kenny tried to hang himself but fell, bruising his head and body, and then tried to slit his throat with a toothpaste tube before succeeding in his second hanging attempt."

When the family received the body from the prison authorities, it was covered in wounds, cuts, and bruises, leading the family to believe Trentadue had been tortured and beaten before his death. Trentadue had sustained three heavy blows to the head, and his throat had been cut; prison authorities claimed the wounds were self-inflicted. The day after Trentadue's death, Kevin Rowland, the chief investigator of the Oklahoma state medical examiner filed a complaint with the FBI reporting irregularities in the investigation of Trentadue's death: the coroner was at first not permitted into the cell where Trentadue had died, and the cell itself was washed out by the afternoon of August 21, 1995, before the legally-required investigation could be performed. The complaint went on to state that, although the exact cause of death could not be determined, the claim that Trentadue had committed suicide was not consistent with the medical examiner's findings, and Trentadue appeared to have been tortured. The FBI paperwork from the agent who received the medical examiner's call reads "murder" and "believes that foul play is suspect[ed] in this matter."

A Board of Inquiry was convened by the Bureau of Prisons. Unusually, the attorney in charge of the investigation was ordered to treat his findings as "attorney work product", a legal distinction that would protect information uncovered in his investigation from any potential lawsuit or Freedom of Information Act inquiries.

== Connection to the Oklahoma City bombing ==
Kenneth's brother Jesse began gathering information on his brother's death, still with no knowledge of a possible connection to the Oklahoma City bombing case. A telephone caller in 1996 told Jesse that his brother had been killed in a botched interrogation, vaguely mentioning bank robberies and alleging that Kenneth "fit a profile". But the anonymous caller gave so few details that Jesse did not give it much credence and soon forgot it.

This assessment changed in 2003, after contact from JD Cash, an Oklahoma City reporter who was skeptical of the mainstream narrative of the Oklahoma bombing. Cash suspected that Kenneth Trentadue was mistaken for Richard Lee Guthrie, a member of the Aryan Republican Army (ARA), a white supremacist group that robbed over 20 banks across the US Midwest during the early 1990s. Members of the ARA were thought to have associated with McVeigh, and were the subject of FBI investigation. Trentadue and Guthrie shared a strong physical resemblance – they were the same height, weight, and muscular build, both had dark hair and thick mustaches, and both had dragon tattoos on their left arm. Both are thought to have resembled the description of "John Doe 2", the never-apprehended possible third conspirator in the bombing along with McVeigh and Terry Nichols.

From his contact with Cash, Jesse Trentadue made the acquaintance of David Paul Hammer. A convicted murderer, Hammer had struck up a friendship with Oklahoma City bomber Timothy McVeigh when both were imprisoned at Federal Correctional Complex, Terre Haute. Hammer would make sworn statements alleging that McVeigh told him information about other conspirators in the Oklahoma City Bombing, including Guthrie.

After being shown a picture of Kenneth Trentadue, Timothy McVeigh is reported to have said, "Now I know why Trentadue was killed, because they thought he was Richard Guthrie."

Less than one year after Trentadue's death, Guthrie would also be found dead in his prison cell, the day before he was scheduled to give a television interview. His death was ruled a suicide by hanging.

In 1999, Alden Gillis Baker, an inmate who had been imprisoned in Oklahoma City's Federal Transfer Center at the same time as Trentadue, stated he would testify that he had witnessed Trentadue's murder. According to FBI documentation, Baker was sharing a cell with Trentadue on the night of his death. However, the authenticity of this documentation has been vigorously disputed by the Department of Justice, and a judge once ruled that Baker was not a credible witness. In December 1999, Baker reported to a lawyer that he feared for his life. In August 2000, he was found dead in his cell. His death was ruled a suicide by the coroner's office. Trentadue family attorneys argued that Baker's hanging was "... pretty incredible because he's the only witness who really came forward and said he saw the guards go in there and murder Kenneth."

== Investigation ==
Trentadue's death was investigated by the FBI, although the agent charged with the task did not view his cell. He did visit the prison itself, but talked with prison employees only – not inmates – and he collected no evidence for the case. For months, there was no movement on the case, but mounting complaints from the state medical examiner caught the ear of the Department of Justice, and in 1996 the DOJ's Civil Rights Division was given jurisdiction over the case. It determined that a federal grand jury ought to be convened, to decide if an indictment should be issued in Trentadue's case. The jury was convened on July 6, 1996.

Medical examiner Fred Jordan remained firm in his refusal to classify the death a suicide. Jordan told the U.S. Attorney's Office that Trentadue had been "abused and tortured", and would even go so far as to say "the federal grand jury is part of a cover-up." To review the case, the Department of Justice consulted forensic pathologist Bill Gormley, of the Armed Forces Institute of Pathology. Gormley contacted Kevin Rowland, the original chief investigator assigned the case by the Oklahoma state medical examiner. In his memo of the conversation, Rowland wrote that Gormley "was troubled that the Department of Justice only seemed interested in him saying it might be possible these injuries were self-inflicted." According to Rowland, Gormley was becoming increasingly sure that Trentadue was murdered.

I think it's very likely [Trentadue] was murdered. I'm not able to prove it. ... You see a body covered with blood, removed from the room as Mr. Trentadue was, soaked in blood, covered with bruises, and you try to gain access to the scene, and the government of the United States says no, you can't. ... At that point we have no crime scene, so there are still questions about the death of Kenneth Trentadue that will never be answered because of the actions of the U.S. government. Whether those actions were intentional—whether they were incompetence, I don't know. ... It was botched. Or, worse, it was planned.

— Fred Jordan, medical examiner, television interview

Senators Orrin Hatch (R, Utah) and Byron Dorgan (D, N.D.) spoke publicly about the case, both raising suspicion about the suicide ruling. Hatch stated to Attorney General Janet Reno in April 1997 hearing that "I fear the Department [of Justice] is not taking this investigation seriously."

Nevertheless, in August 1997 the grand jury found no evidence of foul play in Trentadue's death. The FBI continued to exert pressure on Fred Jordan to rule the case a suicide. Oklahoma Assistant Attorney General Patrick Crawley contacted an attorney in the Department of Justice on Jordan's behalf, telling him that the FBI and the Bureau of Prisons had "prevented the medical examiner from conducting a thorough and complete investigation into the death, destroyed evidence, and otherwise harassed and harangued Dr. Jordan and his staff." In July 1998, Jordan officially changed the listed manner of death from "unknown" to "suicide". His reversal, he said, had been based largely on the analysis of a handwriting expert of Trentadue's supposed suicide note, even though the expert had not been permitted to see the actual note. During a 2002 deposition Jordan would claim to have been "harassed by the Department of Justice from the very beginning".

In November 1999, a further investigation – this time by the U.S. Inspector General – released a report on its findings, stating there was no evidence to support the theory that Trentadue had been murdered, or that there had been a cover-up. The report does however note that the FBI and Bureau of Prisons had poorly conducted the investigation, and that four employees of the federal government had "made false statements" under oath in connection to the Trentadue case.

== Civil suit and other legal action ==
The Trentadue family filed a wrongful death suit against the federal government, and were awarded a judgment of $1.1 million for their emotional distress associated with the way the federal government handled the case. Judge Leonard castigated several prison guards and other witnesses for the defense, writing in his ruling: "From the time of Trentadue's death up to and including the trial, these witnesses seemed unable to comprehend the importance of a truthful answer."

The Federal government appealed the $1.1-million-dollar award, and in August 2007 the United States Court of Appeals for the Tenth Circuit revoked the award and sent the case back to the judge who originally awarded the money. In 2008, after bouncing back and forth twice on appeal, the judge reinstated the award, although the Trentadue family claims Department of Justice attorneys have told them the federal government will never pay, no matter how many judgments the family wins.

In November 2008, Kenneth Trentadue's family offered a $250,000 reward for information leading to a murder conviction in the case of Trentadue's death.

According to one 2008 interview, the federal government did pay a civil settlement, which is the source of the money offered as a reward.

In 2007, Jesse Trentadue requested to conduct videotaped depositions of Terry Nichols and death-row inmate David Paul Hammer on the subject of Kenneth Trentadue's death and on the FBI's possible withholding of documents relating to Kenneth Trentadue, documents that Jesse had requested in a Freedom of Information Act lawsuit. U.S. District Judge Dale Kimball granted Trentadue's request. After the FBI urged him to reconsider in September 2008, Judge Kimball reaffirmed the decision. The FBI appealed the decision, claiming the two prisoners "clearly have no knowledge regarding FBI procedures in filing and searching for records." In July 2009 the United States Court of Appeals for the Tenth Circuit overturned Kimball's decision, barring Jesse Trentadue from conducting the interviews.
