= Michael Brescia =

American bank robber and white supremacist

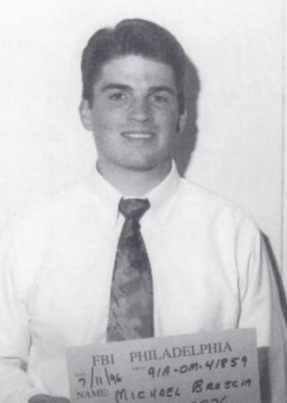
- Brescia's FBI mugshot
- Born: Michael William Brescia; February 10, 1972 (age 54); Philadelphia, Pennsylvania
- Education: La Salle University
- Organization: Aryan Republican Army
- Status: Released
- Conviction: Bank robbery
- Penalty: 57 months in prison

Michael William Brescia (born February 10, 1972) is an American convicted bank robber.

== Background ==
Of Italian and Irish ancestry, he was born to William and Kathleen (née McNulty) Brescia. He has one brother. He grew up in the Andorra neighborhood of Philadelphia, Pennsylvania, where his father was a firefighter and his mother was an accountant. Brescia was both a member of the Aryan Republican Army and a part-time student at La Salle University, at the time of his arrest.

== Extremism involvement ==
While a student at La Salle University, Brescia attempted to create a white supremacist group on campus. In 1993, during his third-year at the school, he abruptly dropped out of school and told friends he was moving to Oklahoma for a job. He actually moved to Elohim City, a white separatist community in Eastern Oklahoma. While staying at Elohim City, Brescia was roommates with Andreas Strassmeir, a German national who was phoned by Timothy McVeigh two weeks prior to the bombing.

=== Aryan Republican Army ===
Brescia was recruited for the Aryan Republican Army (ARA) by Aryan Nations Pennsylvania state leader, Mark W. Thomas. The ARA committed 22 bank robberies across the Midwest between 1994 and 1996, seven of which Brescia was accused of being involved in. Brescia was arrested for bank robbery on January 30, 1997 and later pleaded guilty to bank robbery charges and was sentenced to 57 months in federal prison. Brescia was released from prison on March 22, 2001.
