= Willie Ray Lampley =

Leader of a small far right paramilitary group

Willie Ray Lampley rose to national attention in the United States of America as a self-proclaimed prophet, the head of the Universal Church of God (Yahweh) based in Vernon, Oklahoma which was part of the Christian Identity movement. Lampley was also the leader of a small far right paramilitary group called the Oklahoma Constitutional Militia. In November 1995, he (aged 65) and his wife Cecilia (aged 47), along with John Dare Baird (aged 53) and Larry Wayne Crow (aged 56), were arrested under charges of conspiracy to manufacture and possess a destructive device. According to the FBI, their plan was to bomb abortion clinics, gay bars, federal buildings (including welfare offices of the Department of Human Services), the office of the Anti-Defamation League in Houston, Texas, and the office of the Southern Poverty Law Center in Montgomery, Alabama. According to court documents, Lampley intended to use a destructive device consisting of 'homemade C-4' made of ammonium nitrate, nitromethane, aluminum powder and a detonation device (made from toaster parts). Lampley's plans were interrupted when FBI informant Richard Schrum alerted authorities that the homemade bomb was about to be tested at Elohim City. The FBI held that their foiling the plot "saved as many lives as what was lost in Oklahoma City".

== Background ==
Lampley's anti-government attitudes became apparent in 1989 when during a civil case he declared he owed "No Allegiance to this God-rejecting rebellious Democracy." At the time he also declared that he was an "Ambassador of the Most High God" and that the United States was about to be devastated by natural disasters followed by foreign attack "because the government had turned away from God."

In January 1992, Lampley sent a letter to several organizations including California Governor Pete Wilson. In the letter, Lampley designated himself as "Prophet of the Most High" and that he and his associate John Trescott were "The Two Witnesses" of the Book of Revelation. They declared (emphasis theirs) "In Accordance with the ORDER OF DESTRUCTION which was filed in the Supreme Court of the United States as the result of failure to answer or to comply with a LAWFUL PROCLAMATION AND DEMAND AT THE COMMON LAW OF GOD, the State of California is presently being destroyed and will continue to be destroyed by authority as stated in Revelation 11:3-13.... The Kingdom of God will be established on this earth beginning October 7, 1994... Please write us if you want to be a part of this end-time work." In February 1992, Lampley sent out a letter declaring that he and Trescott would start on a five-week tour of seven western states to give testimony to their leaders in warning "that The Great Tribulation had begun on March 26, 1991 and that it would last for 1,260 days". Trescott later ended his association with Lampley and Anderson Fields Jr. took his place as one of the "two witnesses".

Lampley was deeply affected by the 1993 burning of the Branch Davidian compound in Waco, Texas, keeping a framed photograph of the fire within his otherwise undecorated church which was set-up like a home office.

In a letter sent to the governor of Texas and the governor of Idaho, Lampley wrote (emphasis his) "According to the plan of Almighty God, each state in this Union was supposed to have been a mini-republic under the GOVERNMENT OF GOD, not under Jewish International Bankers. …You will be taken away just as any other real criminal should be and unless there are some real changes on your part before Sept. 20th, this year [1994], you will die."

Lampley produced a pamphlet titled God's Prophets Throughout History, claiming that there was a New World Order conspiracy and "the stage has been set for the trio, Rome, Moscow, and the United States, to take over the whole world."

In April 1995, Vietnam War veteran Larry Wayne Crow of Bentonville, Arkansas left his career as a corporate pilot for Wal-Mart Stores Inc., telling his friends that he was going to become a preacher. He then joined with Lampley, taking Trescott's place as one of the "Two Witnesses". They continued to send out letters including one to an Oklahoma congressman. The two also began attending local militia meetings inspiring them to create their own – the Oklahoma Constitutional militia. Members of other militias advised Lampley to keep his group small so that they "can act independently… the smaller number of people that know about what you're doing, the better off you are."

In June 1995, they wrote President Clinton a letter warning of an imminent foreign invasion led by United Nations' troops.

== Bombing plot ==
Due to the Oklahoma City bombing on April 19, 1995, the FBI increased its scrutiny of militia groups in the Southwest with a particular interest in Oklahoma and Texas. In May 1995, Schrum (aged 50) "a veteran law enforcement officer with 20 years' experience, mostly with the Tulsa Police Department" volunteered to assist the government. By July, he had joined Lampley's church as an informant for the FBI. He later told reporters that "I was to monitor the militia situation ... anybody that might be a potential terrorist or anything that would cause a situation like Oklahoma City. I joined some of the militias and found that most were scared, afraid of Mr. Lampley, so naturally that is where I headed. It turned - after about a six-month surveillance - it turned out to be that type of situation. … They were very determined to complete what their goals were. They are convinced that everything they say is true with the predictions of a prophet. …He was making all these prophecies and none of them were coming true. So he had to get to a point where he had to make some of them come true. You know nobody would believe him anymore. So he was kind of pressured by his own ideas in having to do something."

In August 1995, Lampley and Crow visited the Tri-States Militia in Gregory County, South Dakota looking for support in an attack on buildings. At the time Crow stated "We need to do four or five to create problems for the government. God won't be mad at us if we drop four or five buildings. He will probably reward us." Crow also gave Lampley a book with bomb making instructions at this time.

Having returned from South Dakota, the pair tried to recruit Dennis Mahon of Tulsa, the Oklahoma organizer for the White Aryan Resistance (WAR) into their scheme. Tapes of the conversation recorded by Schrum have Lampley telling Mahon "We're going to need you to help support the underground. We have a situation developing where we're going to have to help the underground actually begin to make some strikes. We're thinking about getting rid of some ADL (Anti-Defamation League) people. " Mahon refused to participate holding that Lampley could not be taken seriously and had seemed "to have a problem with reality…just go[ne] nuts over the Bible."

Lampley acquired six 35-pound bags of ammonium nitrates and a gallon of nitromethane while secretly being photographed by FBI agents as he loaded them into his car.

Acting for the FBI, Schrum wore a microphone on November 10, 1995, and taped Lampley, Cecilia, and Baird making bombs with the same explosive as used in the Oklahoma City bombing which they intended to test at Elohim City, a white-separatist enclave in Adair County run by Lampley's friend Reverend Robert Millar. The choice of test site was protested by Baird who said "the Feds were all over that place…tryin' to spook 'em into doin' somethin' so they can jump on their shit."

The next day, November 11, 1995, the church and several trailer homes next to it were raided by the FBI. Semiautomatic rifles, handguns, ammunition, bomb making equipment, six bags of C-4, and The Anarchist's Cookbook were seized. Lampley, Cecilia, and Baird were arrested at a McDonald's parking lot by Indian Nations Turnpike near Vernon and the three were held at the Muskogee jail. Crow surrendered to U.S. Marshals at Albuquerque, New Mexico three days later. The Oklahoma Highway Patrol bomb squad blew up the seized explosives in a field behind the church.

From his jail cell, Lampley denied that the explosives were for destroying buildings rather they "for use in future guerrilla warfare when the United States is invaded by foreign troops." He also claimed to be indifferent to the criminal charges as "God is going to destroy the nation in three years and 11 months anyway." Schrum told reporters that "Lampley is totally convinced. He believes it beyond a doubt that he's the prophet of God, that he's going to die from all this, and in three days he will rise from the dead and inherit the earth."

While in jail, Lampley told an interviewer that the United Nations was "The Beast of Revelations [chapter] 13" and that it was set to invade the USA because "the American people are from the tribe of Ephraim, from the House of Joseph, we're Israelites" and the Antichrist was coming to punish Israelites because they were in rebellion to God's law. He explained that he had been trying for seven years "to warn the [American] people either to get in harmony with God's law or the whole system is coming down…It's still the matter that, it either gets in harmony with God – well, it's too late now…" He stated that "What we have done is we have filed lawsuits in eleven states, in federal district courts, letting them know that this conspiracy to overthrow the government of God and the government…uh, they have made a determination to overthrow God in the land, and this is nothing but a conspiracy and this is about to come to an end. So basically what I'm saying is, we have filed lawsuits throughout the land to warn everyone in political office that you either change, or you are going to die. And that's what it amounts to. That doesn't mean that we're going to kill them, it simply means that, uh, that they are going to be killed. I mean, all of these officials are going to die because they refuse to obey God."

== Trial ==
In face of the charges against him, Crow struck a plea bargain and cooperated with the prosecution, adding his testimony to Schrum's who also provided taped conversations as evidence.

Lampley had initially told Baird's attorney that Jesus Christ would represent him throughout the trial, but as the court date approached he made use of a defense lawyer.

During the two-week trial of Lampley, Cecilia, and Baird, the three defendants' lawyers' had claimed that they had been entrapped by the FBI on behalf of "an overzealous government seeking retribution against militias for the Oklahoma City bombing." The defense lawyers also protested that the timing of the trial was terrible as it was near the anniversary of the Oklahoma City bombing. They pointed out that Schrum had broken off his surveillance of Lampley between August and October to investigate a different militia in Eufaula – not something that would've happened "if they really thought he was going to hurt anybody". Their attorneys pointed out that Jonathan Bernstein of the Anti-Defamation League had not been warned that he was a possible target until three months after Lampley had brought him up – which was only explicable if the FBI "knew that Ray Lampley was not a threat." They held that "By the time the FBI determined that Ray Lampley wasn't a threat, the investigation already had gone too far to end it." They pointed out that the three had no previous criminal record. Lampley's lawyer also claimed that Post-Traumatic Stress Disorder due to combat service in the Korean War had affected his client.

The prosecution held that the entrapment defense didn't apply because the defendants were predisposed to commit the crime, and "Ray Lampley was given opportunity after opportunity to end it, but he persisted and went forward. He was not induced by (FBI informant) Richard Schrum." The prosecution held that Lampley's bombs were for people he deemed "sodomites" and groups he thought were "agents of the New World Order."

On April 25, 1996, after five hours of deliberation a federal jury returned a verdict of guilty of conspiring to build an ammonium nitrate bomb on Lampley, Cecilia, and Baird. Lampley and Baird were also convicted of carrying firearms in relation to a crime, and Lampley was convicted of solicitation of a crime of violence. Lampley was sentenced to imprisonment of 11 years and six months, Baird was sentenced to 120 months, Cecilia was sentenced to 51 months. Crow as part of his plea deal plead guilty to misprision (concealment of a felony by one not a participant in the crime) received probation, a six-month stay in a halfway house, and was sentenced to 100 hours of community service.
