= Aryan Republican Army =

Group of neo-Nazi bank robbers

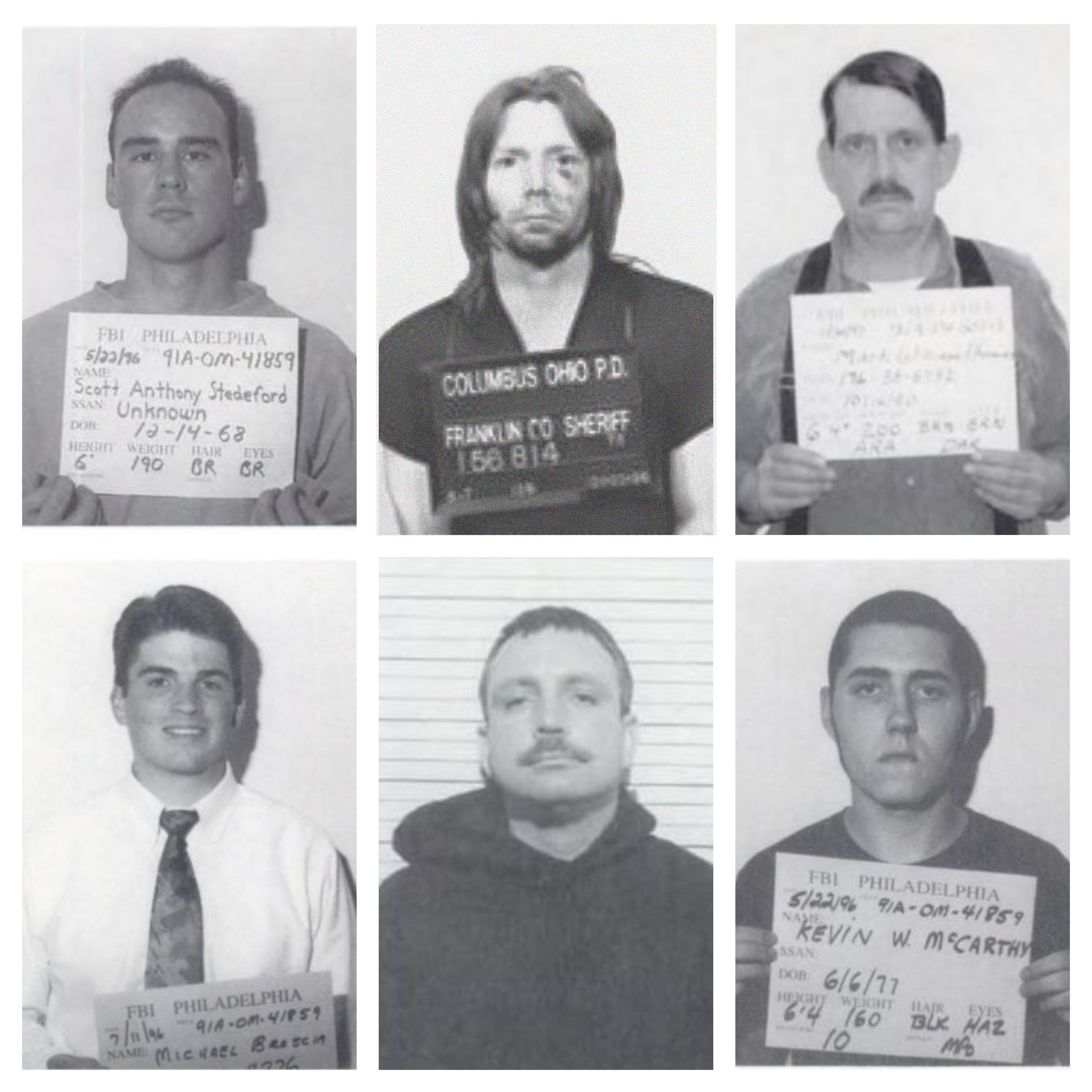
- Mugshots of the (known) members of the Aryan Republican Army. Top row, from left to right: Scott Stedeford, Donna Langan, (Note: Known at the time as Peter Kevin Langan) and Mark Thomas Bottom row, from left to right: Michael Brescia, Richard Lee Guthrie Jr., and Kevin McCarthy
- Leader: Donna Langan
- Founded: 1992
- Dates active: 1992–1996
- Country: United States (Midwest)
- Headquarters: Columbus, Ohio
- Ideology: Neo-Nazism; White supremacy; White separatism; White nationalism; Leaderless resistance; Christian Identity
- Political position: Far-right
- Size: At least 7

The Aryan Republican Army (ARA), also dubbed "The Midwest Bank bandits" by the FBI and law-enforcement, was a white nationalist terrorist gang which robbed 22 banks in the Midwest from 1994 to 1996. The bank robberies were spearheaded by Donna Langan. Members, who had links to Neo-Nazism and white supremacism, were alleged to have conspired with convicted terrorist Timothy McVeigh in the months before the Oklahoma City bombing terrorist attack. Although it has never been proven, many theorists believe the ARA funneled robbery money to help fund the bombing as a direct response to the Waco and Ruby Ridge sieges.

Inspired to rob banks in order to support white supremacist movements by Mark Thomas, the ARA, founded in 1992 by Langan and her best friend from school Richard Lee Guthrie Jr., considered itself a leaderless organization. Although the group was mainly a criminal enterprise, its agenda was terrorist like. After filming and producing right-wing propaganda videos, the group grew and recruited bank robber affiliates: Michael Brescia, Shawn Kenny, Kevin McCarthy, and Scott Stedeford. With the bank heist money, the gang began to stockpile weapons and ammunition in preparation for a future race war. At bank after bank, the bandits became infamous because they left their signature decoy grenades and their pipe bombs as calling cards, a strategy which was implemented to help the gang escape and delay the FBI's pursuit. The bandits used a strict time keeper who called out at elapsed intervals and made sure that they were in and out of the heists within 90 seconds. The time keeping, along with the members wearing of presidential masks, were moves which were believed to be lifted directly from the Kathryn Bigelow film Point Break. In addition to wearing Nixon, Reagan and Clinton masks, the ARA also wore jackets and hats emblazoned with "FBI," "ATF" or other law-enforcement acronyms.

The FBI was unaware of the existence of the ARA until one of its members was apprehended. In early 1996, the group began to fall apart as its members were arrested after former members of the group became informants as part of a plea bargain. Guthrie was arrested in Cincinnati on January 15, 1996, concluding a 2-hour chase by FBI agents. Soon after, Guthrie gave up his counterpart Langan. Three days later on January 18, 1996, the FBI arrested Langan after a 50-round shoot-out near a safe house in Columbus, Ohio.

== Activities ==
Members of the Aryan Republican Army were responsible for a series of 22 bank robberies in the American Midwest. They reportedly targeted banks in the Midwest due to their belief that the security measures which were taken there would be less thorough. The group often left fake explosive devices at the banks which they robbed in order to divert law enforcement officials who could potentially chase them. Known members of the ARA include Langan, Guthrie, Michael William Brescia, Mark William Thomas, Shawn Kenny, Kevin McCarthy, and Scott Stedeford. Subsequent to their arrest, Guthrie, Langan, McCarthy and Thomas became witnesses for the prosecution. Guthrie was found hanged while in custody, a day before he was to give a television interview about an alleged cover-up which was related to the death of Kenneth Michael Trentadue, who was also found hanged while he was in custody. Otherwise, all of the gang's members received prison sentences of varying lengths, on an array of state and/or federal charges.

== Connections to the Oklahoma City bombing ==
Several accounts have linked the ARA with Timothy McVeigh, convicted of the 1995 Oklahoma City bombing that killed 168 and injured hundreds more.

Brescia and Guthrie both resided for a time at Elohim City, Oklahoma, a private community made up of followers of Christian Identity pastor Robert G. Millar (d. 2001), and other people associated with right-wing extremist and white nationalist views. Other ARA members were also known to frequent Elohim City. Elohim City security director Andreas Strassmeir was a known associate of Timothy McVeigh, having met him at a Tulsa gun show, and federal investigators determined that McVeigh had made a phone call to Elohim City on April 5, 1995, just two weeks prior to the Oklahoma City bombing. However, no one at Elohim City claims to have spoken with him.

Additionally, five women from a nightclub in Tulsa have each identified Brescia as the man who was paying for McVeigh's drinks on April 8, 1995, just three days after McVeigh's suspicious phone call. Two more women in Kansas reported that McVeigh and Brescia were frequent associates, while Guthrie bore a distinct physical resemblance to "John Doe Number Two". McVeigh's sister, Jennifer, also claimed that he had been one of the participants in several, unspecified bank robberies.

David Paul Hammer, a convicted murderer who was imprisoned with McVeigh at the United States Penitentiary, Terre Haute, has alleged that McVeigh told him details of the Oklahoma City bombing that contradict the account related in court. According to Hammer, McVeigh claimed to have been working as a deep cover operative for the US Department of Defense, having infiltrated ARA and participated in several of the group's bank robberies. McVeigh is further alleged to have indicated Strassmeir and several others at Elohim City were similarly government agents involved in surveillance of extremist elements of the American far-right.

== Amtrak Sunset Limited ==
The ARA were reportedly suspects in the professional 1995 sabotage and derailment of the Amtrak Sunset limited, injuring 78 people and killing one. Files from the major case investigation, dubbed SPLITRAIL by the FBI, remain classified as of 2025. In the course of the investigation, the FBI conducted interviews with associates of McVeigh from his time living in Kingman and ARA associates from their time attempting to rob banks in Phoenix. As ARA members were largely prosecuted, dead, or in prison in the two years after the derailment, it may have been more expedient to have had the derailment case go unsolved, which simultaneously reassigned multiple agents from the OKC investigation. Per journalist Mark Hamm, the ARA had discussed plots to derail trains.

== Donna Langan ==
Langan was born Peter Kevin Langan in 1958 on Saipan in the South Pacific Islands. She grew up in Vietnam, where her father served in the military and the CIA, before they moved to the United States when Langan was 6 years old. In 1974, at age 16, Langan was sentenced to up to 20 years for robbing a man of $78 and fleeing police. Langan moved to Ohio in 1988, where she converted to Mormonism and became an ordained minister at what authorities describe as a Ku Klux Klan-affiliated church. During the early 1990s, Langan and her childhood friend Richard Guthrie formed the Aryan Republic Army, a white supremacist group with motives to overthrow the US government. The group turned to robbing banks in order to fund their movement. On January 18, 1996, the FBI arrested Langan. Langan, a transgender woman, who publicly renounced her political and racist views, served 18 years in a male prison before she was transferred to a female penitentiary after a legal fight in 2014 during the Obama administration. In 2017, Langan and 435 other transgender inmates who were incarcerated in federal prisons led an LGBT activist group in an effort to challenge the Trump administration's positions regarding transgender prisoners. In 2022, she underwent a gender-affirming surgery, becoming the first transgender inmate in Bureau of Prisons custody to do so. At the start of the second Trump administration in early 2025, she was notified of her impending transfer to a men's facility.

== Other members and associates ==
=== Richard Lee Guthrie Jr. ===
Nicknamed "Wild Bill", Richard Lee Guthrie Jr. grew up within blocks of Langan in Wheaton, Maryland, although they didn't become close until years later. After getting kicked out of the Navy in 1983 for painting a swastika on the side of a ship and threatening superiors, Guthrie attended gatherings of Aryan Nations and traveled the country distributing Christian Identity propaganda.

Guthrie pled guilty in 1996 to three bank robberies in Ohio, and to 16 more in seven states, as well as to weapons charges and credit card fraud. Following a plea agreement, he was to provide authorities with information about terrorist organizations similar to the Aryan Republican Army. On July 12 of that same year, prison officials found Guthrie hanging in his cell, an apparent suicide.

=== Michael William Brescia ===
A resident of Elohim City and a former student at LaSalle University in Philadelphia, Michael William Brescia was recruited for the ARA by Aryan Nations Pennsylvania state leader, Mark W. Thomas. Brescia was named in a lawsuit filed by the grandparents of a victim of the bombing as being "John Doe 2" seen with McVeigh in the days prior to the bombing. A female friend of McVeigh also identified Brescia as a friend of McVeigh's then known only as "Mike".

=== Shawn Kenny ===
A 1991 Oak Hills High School graduate and one-time Aryan Nations member from Cincinnati, Shawn Kenny already had a racist background prior to being befriended by Langan at a law seminar. Kenny, himself, says he had discussed recruiting robbers with Thomas in 1994.

Despite his criminal history and alleged relationship with Timothy McVeigh, he joined the U.S. Army sometime after the ARA was dissolved and an investigation into the Oklahoma City bombing had taken place.

=== Scott Anthony Stedeford ===
Growing up in a middle-class town in Pennsylvania, Stedeford was introduced to the Christian Identity Doctrine and then fell in with the revolutionary movement. During this time, he was also the founding member and frontman of the RAC band, Day of the Sword. Guthrie says to have met Stedeford through Berks County right-wing leader, Mark Thomas.

=== Mark William Thomas ===
A member of both Aryan Nations and Ku Klux Klan, Thomas was ordained an Identity Minister during a stay at Aryan Nations' Idaho headquarters in 1990.

After being indicted in January 1997, Thomas told reporters that at least one gang member was involved in the Oklahoma bombing, according to a newspaper clip in FBI files.

=== Kevin McCarthy ===
A native Pennsylvanian, Kevin "Blondie" McCarthy spent his adolescence experimenting with drugs before eventually becoming a resident of the Elohim City compound in the fall of 1994. McCarthy was also the bass player for Stedeford's group, Day of the Sword.

Under a plea agreement, McCarthy became a government witness and testified in a pre-trial hearing against Langan in Columbus, Ohio. McCarthy received a lengthy prison term for bank robbery, and was released from prison in 2007.

=== Chevie Kehoe ===
A fellow white supremacist and resident of the Elohim City compound, Chevie Kehoe was contracted by the Aryan Republican Army to assassinate the Mueller family. The Mueller family were brief residents of Elohim City that had been privy to information dealing with the alleged connection of the Aryan Republican Army to the Oklahoma City bombing. Prior to murdering the Mueller family (with his accomplice Daniel Lewis Lee), Chevie had sold guns to the ARA.

=== Dennis Mahon ===
While his exact connection to the Aryan Republican Army has not been revealed, white supremacist Dennis Mahon is known to have been a close friend of members of the group during his stay at Elohim City.

A handful of videos were produced in which Dennis Mahon is recorded while he is engaging in paramilitary training alongside Andreas Strassmeir and Carol Howe, as well as a few other individuals which have not been identified. The unidentified militants who appear in the footage may be some members of the Aryan Republican Army, since they lived at Elohim City around the time when the video was recorded. In addition to this, the anonymous persons are seen wearing balaclavas in some videos, while in others, they either sport camouflage face paint or they cannot be seen in detail because they are simply too far away from the camera.

== Sentences ==
Name	Hometown	Sentence
Donna Langan	Columbus, Ohio	Life in prison plus 35 years
Richard Lee Guthrie	Columbus, Ohio	Found dead in his prison cell after pleading guilty
Scott Anthony Stedeford	Ardmore, Pennsylvania	29.5 years
Mark William Thomas	Berks County, Pennsylvania	8 years
Kevin William McCarthy	Bustleton, Philadelphia, Pennsylvania	5 years
Michael William Brescia	Philadelphia, Pennsylvania	57 months

== Popular culture ==
In 2010, the Aryan Republican Army was the subject of episode 82 of the television series Gangland.
