= Carol Howe =

ATF informant (died 2025)

- Born: 1971 or 1972
- Died: January 6, 2025 (aged 53–54); Sparta, Tennessee
- Other names: Sarah Collins: Freya; Lady MacBeth; CI-183; Confidential Informant 53270-183
- Education: Tulsa Metro Christian Academy
- Known for: ATF informant, Oklahoma City bombing claims
- Parents: Robert "Bob" Howe (father); Aubyn Howe (mother)

Carol Elizabeth Howe (1971 or 1972 – January 6, 2025) was an informant for the Bureau of Alcohol, Tobacco, Firearms and Explosives (ATF). Howe became a key figure in Oklahoma City bombing claims when she said that she informed authorities of a right-wing extremist plan to blow up a federal building in Oklahoma a few months before the Oklahoma City bombing.

== Early life ==
Howe was adopted at birth by a wealthy family in Tulsa, Oklahoma. Her father, Bob Howe, was a former CEO of Mapco Incorporated, a Tulsa energy conglomerate. Her mother, Aubyn Howe, worked as a philanthropist. The family were members of Southern Hills Country Club.

After graduating from Tulsa Metro Christian Academy as an honor student, she lived in several places in the early 1990s, either taking college classes or working a variety of "non-career" type jobs.

=== Ties to Dennis Mahon ===
According to White Aryan Resistance member Dennis Mahon, Howe wrote to him in 1993 with an alleged interest in joining his group. Howe said she became involved with white supremacists in 1994 after allegedly being injured by a group of African-American men. According to Howe's lawyer, she then called Dial-A-Racist, a local hotline operated by Mahon. Her ex-husband disputed this account, saying she hurt herself jumping off part of the set for a Passion Play in Chandler Park.

During her time as a white separatist, she obtained a swastika tattoo on her shoulder and an iron cross on her leg.

== Time at Elohim City ==
In 1994, Mahon began taking 24-year-old Howe to the white-separatist enclave in Elohim City, Oklahoma. While living on the compound for some months, she appeared on German television with Mahon to advocate violence as a means to reach the goal of a racially pure, white society.

According to Robert Millar, the founder and spiritual leader of Elohim City, Howe stayed there approximately six weeks before the Oklahoma City bombing. Her relationship with Dennis Mahon had ended after he had apparently raped her, prompting Howe to flee to her grandfather's ranch in Texas.

In August 1994, Howe filed a restraining order against Mahon. This attracted the attention of the ATF, who were already investigating Mahon's radical paramilitary group, W.A.R., for suspected violation of federal firearms and conspiracy laws.

=== Before the Oklahoma City Bombing ===
From August 1994 through March 1995, Howe served as an ATF informant going by the code number CI-183. She was paid $120 a week to monitor the Elohim City compound and wrote monthly reports to her ATF handler, Agent Angela "Angie" Finley-Graham.

Howe described the residents of Elohim City as ultra-militant white separatists with anti-government beliefs. She noted that the community had been sympathetic towards David Koresh, even having a Branch Davidian flag hanging in their church.

Howe said she informed her agency handlers, prior to April 19, 1995, that various Elohim City residents were planning an attack on Federal Buildings, which included the Alfred P. Murrah Federal Building in Oklahoma City.

Agency officials claim that Howe was deactivated because of mental instability. Finely-Graham states that Howe was reinstated in the aftermath of the Oklahoma City bombing, but did no informant work after June 1995.

=== Post-OKC Bombing ===
After the Oklahoma City bombing had occurred, Howe was instructed by the Bureau of Alcohol Tobacco and Firearms to return to Elohim City compound in order to obtain information regarding any possible connection between the residents of the community and the bombing. Starting on May 1, 1995, she stayed on the compound for a total of three days before returning to her ATF handler to report her findings.

On May 18, 1995, Howe was apparently banned from entering Elohim City by Robert Millar due to speculation that she had been a government informant.

== Testimony ==
Howe was present at the Terry Nichols trial, where she testified that she saw Timothy McVeigh in Elohim City in July 1994 with Andreas Carl Strassmeir and Peter Ward. She also identified John Does #1 and #2 as brothers Pete and Tony Ward, both residents of the compound. She said that in the days following the bombing, ATF agents showed her a videotape of McVeigh, and she told the agents she had seen McVeigh at a Ku Klux Klan rally.

Judge Richard P. Matsch refused to allow Howe's testimony in Timothy McVeigh's trial in the Oklahoma City bombing case.

== National Socialist Alliance of Oklahoma ==
Sometime after the bombing, Howe (using the name "Freya"), along with her then-fiancé, James Dodson Viefhaus Jr., formed a white supremacy organization in Tulsa, known as the National Socialist Alliance of Oklahoma, of which they were the only members. The group advocated the destruction of blacks, Jews, homosexuals and federal law enforcement agents.

The alliance operated an Aryan Intelligence Network hotline on which Viefhaus had recorded a message sometime in December 1996 where he made a bomb threat. His message demanded so-called "white warriors" to take action against the U.S. Government and that failure to do so before December 15 (of that year) would result in bombs going off in 15 U.S. cities. Despite this, no bombs detonated. Viefhaus was arrested soon after he recorded this message on an answering machine at the Tulsa house he shared with Howe.

On December 13, 1996, a search warrant was executed at the house the two shared. During a raid by federal agents, various items were found, which, according to FBI bomb expert Robert Heckman, could have been assembled into a pipe bomb with lethal potential. In addition to bomb ingredients, federal agents found several guns, books on how to construct weapons, and lists of alleged targets. Also found in the house was a picture of the couple, holding weapons and wearing swastikas on their clothing.

=== Trial ===
Howe had not been charged previously in connection with the December raid on the home, but at a hearing for Viefhaus, prosecutors had said they considered her "almost an equal threat". She said that she had set up the white supremacist hot line in 1996 to enhance her cover after federal agents disclosed her identity. During her trial, she explained to the jury that her life as a white separatist was only done as a pose to gather information as an undercover government informer. She also testified that the capped pipe, black powder and length of fuse recovered from the home she shared with Viefhaus had been gathered during her work as an informant for the Bureau of Alcohol, Tobacco and Firearms.

Viefhaus was convicted of transmitting a bomb threat by a telephone answering machine and conspiracy to transmit the threat and was sentenced to 38 months in prison for conspiracy, making a bomb threat and possessing the components of a destructive device. Howe was found not guilty in a separate trial.

== Later ==
Howe later changed her name and is the subject of a Columbia Pictures movie project.

She was portrayed by Australian actress Abbey Lee in the 2023 crime drama series Waco: The Aftermath.

Howe was killed in a house fire in Sparta, Tennessee on January 6, 2025. Her death was confirmed by journalist Jon Ronson in his email newsletter in April 2025, also revealing that she was living under the name Sarah Collins.
