= Chevie Kehoe =

American white supremacist and murderer

- Born: Chevie O'Brien Kehoe; January 29, 1973 (age 53); Orange Park, Florida, U.S.
- Status: Incarcerated
- Motive: To finance the establishment of a white ethnostate
- Convictions: Murder in aid of racketeering (3 counts); Racketeering; Conspiracy to commit racketeering
- Penalty: Life imprisonment (June 25, 1999)
- Accomplice: Daniel Lewis Lee (executed in 2020)

Details
- Victims: Jeremy Scott, 23; William Mueller, 52; Nancy Mueller, 28; Sarah Powell, 8
- Date: January 11, 1996
- Country: United States
- States: Idaho and Arkansas
- Date apprehended: June 17, 1997
- Imprisoned at: USP Terre Haute

Chevie O'Brien Kehoe (born January 29, 1973) is an American white supremacist murderer. Between 1990 and 1997, Kehoe ran a white separatist group which engaged in robberies, burglaries, and arms trafficking, as part of a plot to establish a white ethnostate in the Pacific Northwest, known as the Northwest Territorial Imperative.

On January 11, 1996, Kehoe and an accomplice, Daniel Lewis Lee, kidnapped, robbed, tortured, and murdered gun dealer William Mueller, his wife Nancy, and their eight-year-old daughter Sarah. Kehoe was convicted of murder and racketeering, and sentenced to three consecutive life sentences. Daniel Lewis Lee was sentenced to death for the murders, and was executed on July 14, 2020.

== Early life and education ==
Kehoe was born in Orange Park, Florida, United States. He was the oldest of eight sons born to Kirby and Gloria Kehoe, and was named after his father's favorite brand of automobile (Chevrolet). His father had served in the Navy during the Vietnam War. When Kehoe was an infant, his father moved the family to Madison County, North Carolina.

In 1985, Kirby moved the family again, this time to a property near Deep Lake in Stevens County, Washington. Kehoe entered Colville Junior High School as a ninth grader in 1987 where he was an honor student. The Kehoe family were childhood friends with future serial killer and robber Israel Keyes. In 1988, Kehoe's parents pulled him and his younger brother, Cheyne, out of public school, and from then on they were home-schooled.

Raised with increasingly extreme anti-government and white supremacist beliefs, Kehoe formed a plan to bring down the United States government with his self-styled "Aryan People's Republic" (APR) militia. Kehoe married Karena Gumm and the couple had three children. Kehoe took a second wife, Angie Murray in 1993, but the relationship lasted only 54 days.

== Crimes ==
In June 1995, Kehoe and an accomplice kidnapped and robbed Malcolm and Jill Friedman, a couple believed to be Jewish, who owned a store at which Kehoe was once employed.

On July 15, 1995, Kehoe ordered that fellow white supremacist Jeremy Scott be beaten in his presence and then shot in the back of the head by an accomplice, Faron Lovelace, in Bonner County, Idaho. The murder was committed so that Scott's common-law wife, Kelli Kramer, could enter into a relationship with Kehoe. Scott was also suspected of being a government informant. Lovelace was convicted of first degree murder and first degree kidnapping in state court and sentenced to death after admitting his guilt and refusing to defend himself. However, Lovelace later changed his mind and sought to overturn his death sentence. In 2003, his death sentence was vacated under Ring v. Arizona, which required that juries and not judges consider whether aggravating factors in a case warranted a death sentence. In 2005, following an agreement with the Idaho Attorney General, Lovelace agreed to waive all of his appeals in exchange for being resentenced to life in prison without parole. Lovelace died in prison on December 20, 2019, at the age of 68.

On April 29, 1996, Kehoe's accomplice, Daniel Lewis Lee, transported and placed a pipe bomb made by Kehoe at the Spokane City Hall Building in Washington, which detonated and damaged the building. The bomb did not hurt or kill anyone since nobody was present.

=== Mueller family murders ===
In January 1996, Kehoe and Daniel Lewis Lee left the state of Washington and traveled to Arkansas. On January 11, 1996, they arrived at the home of 52-year-old William Frederick Mueller, a gun dealer who lived near Tilly, Arkansas, and who was in possession of a large collection of weapons, ammunition, and cash. Kehoe and his father had previously, in February 1995, robbed Mueller once already, and Kehoe expected to find valuable property at the house. Dressed as FBI agents, the two men tried to enter the home of the Muellers, but they were not at home. When the Muellers returned, Lee and Kehoe overpowered and incapacitated Mueller and his wife, 28-year-old Nancy Ann Mueller (née Branch). They then questioned Nancy Mueller's 8-year-old daughter, Sarah Elizabeth Powell, about where they could find the cash, guns, and ammunition, forcing her to talk by shocking her with an electric cattle prod.

After finding $50,000 in cash, guns, and ammunition, they shot each of the three victims with a stun gun, causing them to pass out. They then placed plastic bags over their heads, and sealed the bags with duct tape, suffocating them to death. There is some evidence that Lee was unwilling to kill Sarah, so Kehoe killed her. They took the victims in Kehoe's vehicle to the Illinois Bayou, where they taped rocks to them and threw each body into the water, a fast-moving stream, despite its status as a bayou. The bodies were discovered in Lake Dardanelle near Russellville, Arkansas, in late June 1996.

Kehoe and his family took the stolen property to a motel in Spokane, Washington, by way of the Christian Identity community of Elohim City, Oklahoma.

William Mueller had put some of the firearms into a Federal Firearms License registry as insurance against potential theft. The Bureau of Alcohol, Tobacco, Firearms and Explosives (ATF) used the ID numbers in the registry to trace the stolen firearms to several other men who confirmed they had purchased them in Spokane from Chevie Kehoe and his father Kirby.

=== 1997 shootout ===
On February 15, 1997, Kehoe and his brother Cheyne were involved in two shootouts with law enforcement officers in Wilmington, Ohio.

External videos
- Chevie and Cheyne Kehoe Shoot out with Ohio State Highway Patrol trooper and a deputy sheriff in Wilmington, Ohio

The first incident happened with John Harold Harker, an Ohio State Highway Patrol trooper, and Robert Gates, a Clinton County, Ohio Sheriff's Office deputy. The Highway Patrol trooper had stopped their vehicle, a blue Chevy Suburban, for driving too slowly and erratically on the road. Harker found the license plate and registration had expired; the brothers also failed to produce any driver's licenses. Chevie, the driver, complied with the officer's orders to get out of the car but warned him against touching him when Harker tried to search him. Gates noticed the trouble the state trooper was having with Chevie and stopped to help. As one of the officers called for a tow truck to impound the vehicle, Chevie suddenly began to dash back to the vehicle with the officers in pursuit. The officers had pinned Chevie to a patrol car and were trying to subdue him when Cheyne produced a handgun from his passenger seat and opened fire on the officers, allowing Chevie to jump back into the Suburban and escape. Cheyne himself fled into the nearby woods, where police searched unsuccessfully for him for the whole day.

Later that day, Chevie was involved in a shootout in an electrical supply company parking lot with two Wilmington police officers, Ofc. Richard "Rick" Wood and Sgt. Robert "Bob" Martin. During the second shootout, a passer-by motorist, 56-year-old Frank Marsden, was hit in the shoulder.

The two shootouts were recorded on both the trooper and the sergeant's dashboard camera in their patrol vehicle and was widely broadcast in the media at the time. Footage of the shootout was first aired in 1997 on FOX's World's Scariest Police Shootouts. It has since been shown on such television programs as Most Shocking and World's Most Amazing Videos, among others.

=== On the run and arrest ===
After fleeing from police, Chevie and Cheyne Kehoe traveled secretly with their families through different states before settling in a ranch in Utah. They worked for the local ranch owner for a time, but disputes between the brothers over Chevie's extremist ideology grew bitter and eventually violent, and ultimately Cheyne left, taking his family with him. He subsequently surrendered to local police and directed them and the FBI back to the Utah ranch, where Chevie Kehoe was arrested on June 17, 1997.

In federal court Kehoe was charged with:

- Racketeer Influenced and Corrupt Organizations (RICO) statute (18 U.S.C. §§ 1962(c) and (d))
- Murdering in aid of racketeering (18 U.S.C. § 1959)
- Robbery conspiracy (18 U.S.C. § 1951)

Kehoe denied the criminal accusations against him and filed appeals. His appeals have been denied.

== Sentencing ==
On February 20, 1998, Kehoe pleaded guilty in Ohio state court to felonious assault, attempted murder, and carrying a concealed weapon related to a February 15, 1997, shootout in Wilmington, Ohio, with an Ohio State Highway Patrol Trooper and a Clinton County sheriff's deputy during a traffic stop resulting from expired tags on his 1977 Chevrolet Suburban.

In 1999, Kehoe was convicted in federal court for the January 1996 murders of gun dealer William Mueller, his wife Nancy Mueller, and her 8-year-old daughter, Sarah Powell. He received three life terms without parole after the jury voted against a death sentence. Kehoe's mother Gloria and his younger brother Cheyne served as prosecution witnesses and testified against him at the trial. However, they both kept the secret until he got caught. Cheyne Kehoe received a 24-year prison sentence for attempted murder and weapons possession due to his role in the Ohio shootout, while Kirby Kehoe received 44 months after pleading guilty to federal racketeering charges.

Cheyne Kehoe's sentence was later reduced to 11 years, resulting in him being released from prison in 2008. On October 14, 2013, he and his father were arrested by federal officials in Arizona, after an ATF raid on an "off-grid compound." The government discovered a commercial-grade marijuana growing operation, as well as an arsenal of weapons, a set of body armor, three bulletproof vests, and explosive powder. They seized 17 firearms, 16,891 rounds of ammunition and about 15 pounds of marijuana. In 2014, Cheyne and Kirby pleaded guilty to being felons in possession of firearms and ammunition. Cheyne was sentenced to 41 months in prison, while Kirby was sentenced to 10 years in prison. Cheyne was released from prison on September 16, 2016, while Kirby was released from prison on January 18, 2022.

Kehoe was imprisoned at United States Penitentiary, Florence ADX in Fremont County, Colorado, under Federal Bureau of Prisons register number: #21300-009. In November 2019, he was transferred to United States Penitentiary, Florence High. On December 18, 2020, Kehoe was transferred to United States Penitentiary, McCreary in Kentucky. He was then held at United States Penitentiary, Big Sandy in Inez. As of 2022, he is held at United States Penitentiary, Terre Haute.

== Oklahoma City bombing allegations ==
Kehoe has been accused of being involved in, or having prior knowledge of, the Oklahoma City bombing on April 19, 1995.

Cheyne claimed to have knowledge of Chevie's involvement in the bombing shortly after he was sentenced for his role in the shootout. The manager of the Shadow motel in Spokane claimed to have seen Chevie with convicted bomber Timothy McVeigh at the motel, four to six months prior to the bombing. The manager also claimed that on the morning of the bombing, Chevie appeared at the motel office and asked the manager to put on CNN and became ecstatic when news of the bombing appeared. The manager also claimed that Chevie had told him in the days prior that something big would happen on April 19.

Kehoe denied the allegations and the FBI found no evidence McVeigh had ever travelled to Spokane.

== Media ==
The Discovery Channel's docudrama series The FBI Files reenacts the behavior of Kehoe and Lee while also showing the forensic science used by the FBI to arrest them in season 2, episode 16, "Deadly Mission", originally aired: 2000.

The A&E criminal justice series American Justice profiled Chevie Kehoe's white supremacist motivations on season 10, episode 14, "Raised on Hate", originally aired on August 8, 2001.
