= Andreas Strassmeir =

Oklahoma City Bombing figure

- Born: 17 May 1959 (age 67); Berlin, West Germany
- Other names: Andy the German; Mr. Red; Andy the Kraut; Andrew Strassmire; Andy Stassdmeir; Andy Strassdmeir
- Occupation: West German Infantry Officer (formerly)

Andreas Carl Strassmeir (born 17 May 1959) is a German former soldier who was the head-of-security for the white separatist community of Elohim City, Oklahoma. He gained media attention for his alleged connection to the Oklahoma City Bombing and has become an important figure in its conspiracy theories.

== Early life ==
Strassmeir was born in Berlin-Wilmersdorf, the son of Günter Straßmeir, leader of the Berlin branch of the Christian Democratic Union between 1989 and 1991, who served as the Chief of Staff to Chancellor Helmut Kohl.

Strassmeir studied at a military university in Hamburg, where he majored in museology and theology. After briefly joining a charismatic Christian commune in Berlin, he entered the German Army in 1979, training as a Panzergrenadier. His military service lasted for a total of five years, during which he reached the rank of lieutenant.

== Time in the U.S. ==
After resigning from his position as a liaison officer with the British Welsh Guard, Strassmeir moved to Washington, D.C. to pursue a career within the U.S. Department of Justice. According to Strassmeir himself, he had hoped to work for the operations section of the Drug Enforcement Administration. His efforts to obtain a career within the federal government were aided by Vincent Petruskie, a retired U.S. Air Force colonel who had apparently met Strassmeir's father while he (Petruskie) was stationed in Berlin. In interviews, Strassmeir has referred to Vincent Petruskie as "a former CIA guy my father had known". Petruskie confirms that he had assisted Andreas Strassmeir in finding such a job, but denies having any connection to the CIA.

After spending some time in a kibbutz in Israel, Strassmeir moved to Houston, Texas, in 1989 where he started working as a salesman for a computer company. Strassmeir was involved in the American Civil War reenactment scene due to having an interest in the American Confederacy. During this time, he became involved with the Texas Light Infantry militia before eventually getting expelled due to speculation from members that Strassmeir was a government agent. Afterwards, he became active in right wing and neo-Nazi circles, where he eventually met his future attorney, Kirk Lyons.

Andreas Strassmeir was also reported to have spent some time in Knoxville, Tennessee, where he obtained a state drivers license. According to Ray Woodruff, a landlord of Strassmeir's, he rented a 1,300-square-foot house located at 7613 Thorngrove Pike but never lived in it.

Strassmeir initially had a two-year tourist visa for his stay in the United States, which was never renewed, subsequently residing illegally in the country between 1991 and 1996.

== Elohim City ==
In 1991, Kirk Lyons introduced Andreas Strassmeir to Elohim City - a white separatist community in Oklahoma. A year later, Strassmeir moved there and became the chief of security and weapons training. According to Lyons, Strassmeir hoped to marry an Elohim City woman and gain permanent resident status in the United States.

During this time, he struck a friendship with Michael William Brescia, a member of the Aryan Republican Army. The two shared a room together on the compound.

While working as a confidential informant (CI) for the ATF, Elohim City resident, Carol Howe informed her agency handler about Andreas Strassmeir and how he would frequently talk about "blowing up federal buildings" and using "direct action against the U.S. Government". At the time, Carol Howe was unaware of Strassmeir's full name, and simply knew him as "Andy the German".

After the OKC Bombing, Strassmeir fled the compound with fellow Elohim City residents Pete and Tony Ward.

== Departure from the United States ==
Robert Millar, Elohim City's founder, quickly "expelled" Andreas Strassmeir soon after he became aware that the FBI was looking at Strassmeir for possible ties to McVeigh and the bombing. On May 2, 1996, the U.S. Department of Justice messaged the German government to question Strassmeir, on account of him still being registered in Berlin, in order to have him testify as a witness. The Federal Ministry of Justice and Consumer Protection denied the request unless Strassmeir was rendered ineligible for the death penalty in case of prosecution as an accomplice.

Notes from a 1997 FBI investigation state that sometime after the bombing, CIA pilot Dave Halloway flew Andreas Strassmeir out of the United States. While that same report records that Strassmeir was flown to Berlin, many have speculated that he was instead flown to Mexico. However, in a letter to the McCurtain Gazette from Strassmeir's attorney Kirk Lyons, he says his client's sudden departure from the U.S. was aided by members of Germany's elite counterterrorism unit, GSG 9.

In a 1997 interview with Der Spiegel, Strassmeir denied rumours of his involvement, stating that he had left due to the media frenzy around the case and because he did not want to testify at McVeigh's trial, as requested by McVeigh's lawyer. Strassmeir said that the FBI did not investigate him further after a phone call and while he did cross into Mexico before leaving the country, he stated he was never on the run from authorities. Strassmeir stated that his relationship with McVeigh amounted to a brief meeting at a gun show in Tulsa in 1993, where they talked for around ten minutes while selling McVeigh a combat knife. He acknowledged that McVeigh had phoned him two days before the bombing, but Strassmeir had not been home at the time and could not explain what McVeigh wanted from him.

Strassmeir had reportedly disavowed the right-wing extremist movement upon his return to Germany. After temporarily moving back in with his parents in Berlin, Strassmeir relocated to an "impoverished corner of Europe" with two friends, and by 2013, he ran a miniature model business based out of Berlin.
