= Molly Conger =

American activist and journalist

- Born: 1990 or 1991
- Occupations: Journalist and Podcaster
- Known for: Charlottesville reporting Far-right doxing

Molly Conger (born 1990 or 1991) is an American activist and journalist based in Charlottesville, Virginia. After the Unite the Right rally in 2017, Conger stopped working in project management, and started researching the far-right. She documents Charlottesville news and briefly worked as a columnist at a local newspaper.

She identified Teddy Joseph Von Nukem as a perpetrator in an assault during the rally and was first to break news of his death in 2023.

As of 2026 she hosts the podcast Weird Little Guys.

== Career and activism ==
Conger is an antifascist researcher and activist. She started live-tweeting government meetings in Charlottesville in 2017, after the Unite the Right rally. She identified Teddy Joseph Von Nukem as a participant in an assault of a counter-protester at the rally. She was also the first person to break the news of Von Nukem's death on February 14, 2023.

In 2017, Conger was hired by a local weekly newspaper to write political columns, her contract was cancelled in February 2019, after writing only six columns. In 2017, Conger began researching the far-right and doxing notable members. She uses fake social media profiles to infiltrate online far-right communities. She is part of Deplatform Hate, a collective of online activists who disrupt the online activities of far-right groups.

In 2021, she identified a Prince William County, Virginia police officer and Proud Boys member whose social media accounts advocated for violence against Supreme Court Chief Justice John Roberts as Aaron Hoffman. Hoffman's employment was terminated, and he claimed his social media accounts were hacked. In 2021, she attended the January 6 United States Capitol attack to document the events.

Prior to her activism, Conger worked as a project manager at an educational software company. Conger's work is funded by donations.

As of 2026 Conger is the host of the podcast Weird Little Guys under the podcast network Cool Zone Media. The podcast covers Conger's research of White Supremacist groups and individuals with focus on their crimes and court proceedings. She is also a frequent guest on the podcast series It Could Happen Here and was the guest co-host of the first four episodes of Knowledge Fight Country with Dan Friesen.

== See also ==
- Radical right (United States)
