= Elohim City, Oklahoma =

Private community in Adair County, Oklahoma, US

- Private community
- A sign warning the public

- Location within Oklahoma Location within the United States
- Coordinates: 35°38′34″N 94°30′54″W
- Country: United States
- State: Oklahoma
- County: Adair
- Founded: 1973
- Founder: Robert G. Millar

Government
  - Leader: John Millar

Area
  - Total: 400 acres (160 ha)
- Elevation: 1,270 ft (390 m)
- Time zone: UTC-6 (Central (CST))
  - Summer (DST): UTC-5 (CDT)
- ZIP Code: 74960
- Area codes: 918, 539
- GNIS feature ID: 2806997

Elohim City (Note: Elohim is a Hebrew word usually translated as "God", sometimes "Gods" because in Hebrew most plural masculine nouns end in –im.) (also known as Elohim City Inc. and Elohim Village) is a private community in Adair County, Oklahoma, United States. The 400-acre (160-hectare) rural retreat was founded in 1973 by Robert G. Millar, a Canadian immigrant, former Mennonite, and "one of the most important leaders" in America's Christian Identity movement, a theology common to an assortment of right-wing extremist groups. The community gained national attention for its ties to members of The Order in the 1980s, as well as with convicted Oklahoma City bomber Timothy McVeigh in the 1990s.

The enclave consists of approximately one dozen structures, some of them mobile homes and others modernistic dome houses. The center of activity is the church-community center, where residents meet for hour-long sessions each morning.

Robert G. Millar died on May 28, 2001. After his death, his second-oldest son, John Millar, became the leader of Elohim City. John Millar died on February 28, 2019.

== History ==
Robert G. Millar
- Born: Robert Grant Millar; August 16, 1925; Kitchener, Ontario, Canada
- Died: May 28, 2001 (aged 75); Elohim City, Oklahoma, U.S.
- Other names: Grandpa Millar; Rev. Millar
- Occupations: Religious leader; minister
- Children: 8

Robert G. Millar emigrated in the 1950s from Kitchener, Ontario to Oklahoma City, where he established a church. In the mid-1960s, Millar moved to Maryland, where he ran an evangelical camp near Ellicott City. This camp was located in Howard County on Frederick Road about one mile (1.6 km) west of US Route 29, at the former location of St. Charles College, a Catholic minor seminary destroyed by fire in 1911. (Note: The area, which was rural until the 1980s, has since been developed into a suburban housing community. The ruins of the seminary's recreation hall are now located in the middle of Terra Maria Way circle (39.287713°N 76.887635°W).)

In 1973, Millar returned to Oklahoma with around 18 followers, some of whom were related to him by birth or marriage, to found Elohim City.

=== Criminal events ===
In 1986, a Canadian woman and her children sought refuge in the city, contravening a court order awarding custody of the children to her husband. Officers attempting to arrest the woman were met by an armed man.

By the mid-1990s, four members of the Aryan Republican Army (Michael William Brescia, Kevin McCarthy, Scott Stedeford, and Mark Thomas) were residents of Elohim City. Brescia was engaged to Millar's step-granddaughter and stayed in the settlement for almost two years. Between 1994 and 1995, these four, together with other members of the ARA (known by the media as the Midwest Bank Robbers), were responsible for a series of 22 bank robberies totaling over $250,000 in the American Midwest, which they used to finance white supremacist causes. Millar denied any knowledge of the robberies.

According to researchers from the Terrorism Research Center of the University of Arkansas, the ARA may have recruited residents of Elohim City or sent ARA members there. In addition, Elohim City may have helped the ARA distribute funds to other white supremacist groups and may have provided the group with areas for training. The Mueller family, who were brief residents of Elohim City, reportedly left the compound in fear they would be assassinated by the ARA. The Muellers were supposedly privy to information connecting the ARA to the Oklahoma City bombing. Soon after, the Mueller family were tortured and assassinated by Chevie Kehoe and Daniel Lewis Lee under the direction of the ARA.

The remains of former Elohim City guest Richard Snell were released to Elohim City residents following his April 19, 1995 execution in Arkansas. Snell taunted jailers that something drastic would happen on the day of his execution. The Alfred P. Murrah Federal Building was destroyed by explosives in the hours before he died. Earlier criminal proceedings had produced evidence that Snell and other affiliates visited the Murrah Building in 1983 to examine it as a possible bombing target.

However, when Snell watched televised reports of the Oklahoma City bombing prior to his execution, according to Millar, who was with Snell at the time, Snell was appalled by what he saw. This contrasts with reports that he was seen nodding in agreement while watching the broadcast. McVeigh is known to have telephoned Elohim City two weeks before the bombing of the Murrah building.

In 2008 an Adair County man, who had been evicted from Elohim City, was charged with threatening to commit violence against several Elohim City residents. He was acquitted in 2009, following a two-day jury trial in which he represented himself.

By 2023, Elohim was seen locally as only a small religious town in spite of its past associations.

== Customs and ideology ==
The town is run by a board of directors whose members are called "elders". The residents believe in and advocate white supremacism. Polygamy was acceptable at one time.

In an interview with The Oklahoman, Millar asserted that if anyone, including government agents, were to come to Elohim City to commit criminal acts, the community would defend itself.

=== Religion ===
Elohim City's particular brand of faith draws heavily from the Old Testament. The community's residents attend daily religious services, and singing and dancing play a large role in the ceremonies. Religious services are held in a meeting center with a domed roof made of polyurethane. An estimated 60% of the community's residents attend these daily 1-2 hour meetings, where they also make announcements or discuss community and family business. Saturday is the community's day of rest.

Robert G. Miller declared that the CSA leader James Ellison was a "prophet full of vision" who would unite the attending groups so they could do battle with the so-called Zionist Occupied Government.

=== Education ===
Elohim City is located within the Belfonte Public School school district. There is a private school in the community, Bethel Christian School.

== Industry ==
According to Robert Millar, Elohim City operates a small sawmill and trucking enterprise on its property. Millar's son, Bruce, owns a fleet of motor-freight rigs that he leases to National Carriers Inc., a hauling company that transports general commodities and hazardous materials.

== Law enforcement investigations ==
The US government has monitored the private community since the 1980s due to its alliance with various white supremacist groups and members of the Aryan Nations.

Prior to July 1995, FBI informant Richard Schrum was sent to infiltrate Elohim City, but he was unable to find anything illegal on the compound.

Sometime before the Oklahoma City bombing, federal officials had planned to raid Elohim City. As a precaution, police scanners were monitored by the community and spotters were on the lookout to advise them of approaching suspect vehicular traffic. During this time, Millar also noted an increase in flights over Elohim City.

=== Alleged illegal activities ===
An unnamed source, disclosed in a 1995 FBI report, has stated that Elohim City received approximately 96 yards of concrete that had been transported via 122 truckloads from a local concrete company. While the anonymous individual was uncertain of what the purpose of the concrete was, additional unnamed sources have indicated the existence of bunkers and weapon storage facilities on the Elohim City compound.

This same FBI document noted that a number of unnamed sources alleged the community was generating income through the sale of illegal drugs, which were allegedly produced and grown on the compound. Similarly, author David Hoffman claims in his 1998 book The Oklahoma City Bombing and the Politics of Terror that at one time, law enforcement officials had received reports that the compound was believed to be generating income through the sale of illegal drugs. He adds that an unnamed source "familiar with the community" had told him about an incident when resident Bruce Millar (a son of Robert Millar) was supposedly "strung out" on methamphetamine.

== Population ==
=== 2020 census ===
As of the 2020 census, Elohim City had a population of 45. The median age was 30.3 years. 35.6% of residents were under the age of 18 and 8.9% of residents were 65 years of age or older. For every 100 females there were 275.0 males, and for every 100 females age 18 and over there were 222.2 males age 18 and over.

0.0% of residents lived in urban areas, while 100.0% lived in rural areas.

There were 17 households in Elohim City, of which 52.9% had children under the age of 18 living in them. Of all households, 64.7% were married-couple households, 0.0% were households with a male householder and no spouse or partner present, and 29.4% were households with a female householder and no spouse or partner present. About 23.5% of all households were made up of individuals and 0.0% had someone living alone who was 65 years of age or older.

There were 17 housing units, of which 0.0% were vacant. The homeowner vacancy rate was 0.0% and the rental vacancy rate was 0.0%.

Racial composition as of the 2020 census
Race	Number	Percent
White	24	53.3%
Black or African American	0	0.0%
American Indian and Alaska Native	6	13.3%
Asian	0	0.0%
Native Hawaiian and Other Pacific Islander	0	0.0%
Some other race	0	0.0%
Two or more races	15	33.3%
Hispanic or Latino (of any race)	7	15.6%

=== Millar family ===
Robert Millar had a total of eight children. His four sons all live at Elohim City.

- Dorcas Millar – The wife of John Millar.
- Lorraine Allen Millar – the late wife of Elohim City's founder, Robert Millar.

=== Other residents ===
Other individuals who either stayed or lived at Elohim City (some of whom later appeared in national news) include:

- Rokus den Hartog, Millar's protégé who (along with his wife and seven daughters) lived on the compound for a couple of years in the 1980s.
- George Eaton, founder of Present Truth Ministries and publisher/editor of a right-wing, anti-Semitic newsletter called The Patriot Report, of which Timothy McVeigh was a known subscriber.
- James Ellison, white supremacist leader of The Covenant, The Sword, and the Arm of the Lord.
- Michael J. Fortier, an army buddy of Timothy McVeigh's, who was imprisoned for failing to warn authorities of the Oklahoma City bombing.
- Carol Howe, ATF informant who worked undercover in Elohim City.
- Chevie Kehoe, a self-proclaimed white supremacist and convicted murderer.
- Willie Ray Lampley, a self-proclaimed prophet, leader of the now-defunct Oklahoma Constitutional Militia and the head of the Universal Church of God (Yahweh). For unknown reasons, Lampley had planned to test a homemade bomb at Elohim City, but was thwarted by the FBI. He was also friends with Robert Millar as the two were both firm believers of Christian Identity.
- Faron Earl Lovelace, convicted in a separate case of murdering a man he believed was a federal informant.
- Dennis Mahon, a former imperial dragon in the Oklahoma Ku Klux Klan and an organizer for White Aryan Resistance.
- Kerry Noble, the second-in-command of The Covenant, The Sword, and the Arm of the Lord. He was part of the plot to blow up the Murrah Federal Building in 1983.
- Zera Patterson IV
- Andreas Strassmeir, German immigrant, head of Elohim City security, phoned by Timothy McVeigh two weeks before the OKC bombing.
- Pete Ward Jr.

== See also ==
- Theodore Rinaldo
- Waco siege
