= David Paul Hammer =

American murderer (1958–2019)

David Paul Hammer (October 9, 1958 – June 7, 2019) was an American federal prisoner serving life without possibility of parole. He was sentenced to death on November 4, 1998, for the murder of his cellmate, Andrew Marti. Hammer's federal conviction was vacated in 2005 for the government's Brady violation (failure to disclose exculpatory or mitigating information it had). After 16 years in isolation on federal death row isolation at Terre Haute prison in Indiana, in 2014 the court resentenced him to life without parole. He was serving his sentence at the ADX Florence, Colorado until his death at Terre Haute in 2019.

== Early years ==
David Hammer, the oldest of three children, grew up in an abusive and impoverished family. Hammer's schooling was unstable; he attended 21 different schools before he dropped out of high school at the age of 15. ”

== Criminal history ==
Hammer developed a drug addiction after running away from his family's home. In 1978, at the age of 19, Hammer visited the emergency room at the local hospital. He was under the influence of phencyclidine. After a confrontation with a hospital security guard, Hammer took 3 people hostage using a handgun. He was apprehended by police after three hours of failed negotiations.

Hammer continued to commit criminal offenses following this event. The Oklahoma County prosecutors charged him with kidnapping, robbery using a firearm, and shooting with intent to kill. The judge convicted Hammer and sentenced him to 400 consecutive years on each count.

Hammer was placed into federal custody and remained in custody until his death.

== Death sentence ==
In September 1996, the United States Attorney for the Middle District of Pennsylvania charged Hammer with the April 1996 death of his cellmate, 27-year-old Andrew Hunt Marti. Hammer and Marti were both housed in the Special Housing Unit at the U.S. Penitentiary Allenwood. The government alleged Hammer strangled Marti using a piece of cell-made cord while both men were housed in the Special Housing Unit at U.S.P. Allenwood.

In June 1998, midway through his jury trial, Hammer pleaded guilty. On November 4, 1998, the Federal District Judge in the Middle District of Pennsylvania sentenced Hammer to death. On January 14, 1999 at 10:00 A.M., Hammer was scheduled to die by lethal injection.

Initially, Hammer resigned himself to his fate, finding no motivation to fight his conviction. He had no plans to fight his death sentence. Later he acquiesced and allowed an appeal to be filed. However, once a Notice of Appeal was filed, he vacillated on his decision to appeal. After arguing to dismiss his own appeal before the Third Circuit, the appeals court agreed.

During the next few years, Hammer had multiple execution dates set for January 14, 1999, November 16, 2000, February 2001, and June 8, 2004. Weeks before his first execution date, Hammer contacted Sister Camille D'Arienzo, a Sister of Mercy, asking for prayers for him and his victim. Sister Camille traveled from New York to USP Allenwood with a laicized priest to visit Hammer just 2 weeks from his scheduled execution. Sister Camille became Hammer's spiritual advisor. Once BOP transferred Hammer to USP Terre Haute, Sister Camille arranged for Sister Rita Clare Gerardot, a Sister of Providence from St. Mary's of the Woods, to visit him on a regular basis. With the support, encouragement and counseling of Sisters Camille and Rita Clare, Hammer devoted his time in prison to help others. Before the Christmas holidays, he created artwork which the Sisters used to create and print holiday cards for sale. The Sisters ensured, at Hammer's request, that the money raised was donated to organizations that helped abused or at-risk youth, and poor and needy children in Haiti and Jamaica. Over several years, Hammer helped to raise $92,000 to help impoverished children like himself. Sisters Camille and Rita Clare remained his spiritual advisors and friends.

On October 25, 2000, a Pennsylvania U.S. District Judge postponed Hammer's second execution date scheduled for November 16, 2000 to allow Hammer time to appeal. Had the execution gone forward, Hammer would have been the first prisoner executed by the federal government in 37 years.

Hammer credited the nine-year-old daughter of Juan Raul Garza, Brownsville drug boss and fellow death row inmate (executed in 2001), for his motivation to fight his conviction. The daughter, Elizabeth Ann Garza, reportedly told Hammer that ‘his life could make a difference for others.’

Elizabeth Ann's letter to President Bill Clinton appealing against her own father's sentence was also reported to have motivated Hammer to appeal his own death sentence. Hammer himself wrote to President Clinton, asking him to commute for Garza's sentence to life imprisonment, describing the death penalty as "plagued by systemic bias, disparity and arbitrariness." Clinton Era documents released in 2014 showed "former President Jimmy Carter and his wife, Rosalynn, weighed in on behalf of Juan Raul Garza and David Paul Hammer, arguing that Mr. Clinton should spare them because of problems with the application of capital punishment in America."

While housed at the ADX Florence, Hammer and Timothy McVeigh first became acquainted. They were in the first group of death-sentenced inmates to be housed in the newly refurbished death row at USP Terre Haute, eventually living in adjacent cells.

In 2004, during Hammer's time on death row at USP Terre Haute, he published his autobiography, The Final Escape. He wrote two books on the Oklahoma City bombing based on knowledge gleaned first-hand from Timothy McVeigh before McVeigh's execution: Secrets Worth Dying For: Timothy James McVeigh and the Oklahoma City Bombing (2004), co-authored with Jeffery William Paul.

Later in 2010, Hammer published Deadly Secrets: Timothy McVeigh and the Oklahoma City Bombing. In May 2010, shortly following Deadly Secrets’ publication, Hammer appeared on Alex Jones’ talk show for an extended interview, detailing his relationship with McVeigh and McVeigh's account of the US government's alleged involvement in the bombing.

On February 11, 2004, Hammer's third execution date was set for June 8, 2004. The Appellate Court stayed Hammer's execution only 4 days before June 8 to allow for review of his case. On December 27, 2005, the district court vacated Hammer's death sentence and set aside his conviction based upon the government hiding favorable evidence that supported Hammer's defenses.

Back in court, on July 17, 2014, U.S. District Judge Joel Slomsky resentenced Hammer to life imprisonment without possibility of parole. Judge Slomsky found multiple circumstances warranting a sentence less than death, including Hammer's acceptance of responsibility and remorsefulness, his extended family history of dysfunction, abuse and mental illness, his mental and emotional impairments, and his self-improvement. Slomsky also identified Hammer's medical diagnoses - "diabetes mellitus, type II [high blood sugar requiring insulin dependency], diabetic polyneuropathy [the gradual destruction of nerve sensations, especially in the extremities], diabetic retinopathy [scarring of the retina], and/or diabetic macular edema [release of retinal blood into the vitreous fluid in the eye, blocking vision to the point of legal blindness]" - and Hammer's charitable contributions during his 9 years on death row and his correspondence with at-risk children counseling them against engaging in criminal conduct.

== Life in prison ==
At the time of his resentencing, Hammer had long been classified as a BOP Medical Care Level 3 inmate. In early 2015, after 18 years in solitary confinement, BOP transferred Hammer directly to USP Tucson, one of the few BOP prisons able to accept Care Level 3 inmates. Within a few months, they hospitalized Hammer for a partial amputation of his right foot for osteomyelitis, a bone infection. The amputation did not cure his condition, and BOP reclassified him to a Care Level 4.

In early 2016, BOP transferred Hammer to MCFP Springfield, a medical prison. In 2017, a further right foot amputation removed the ulcerated area. He also suffered a minor stroke in August 2017. Hammer's blindness became almost total. In March 2018, BOP moved Hammer to ADX Florence, Colorado after he strangled an inmate. This is an administrative maximum or "supermax" federal prison in Florence, Colorado, also known as the "Alcatraz of the Rockies."

Except for two brief escapes during the 1980s, Hammer was continuously incarcerated for over 40 years. Hammer served 30 of those years in solitary confinement isolation, and 16 years on death row.
