= Timothy McVeigh =

American domestic terrorist (1968–2001)

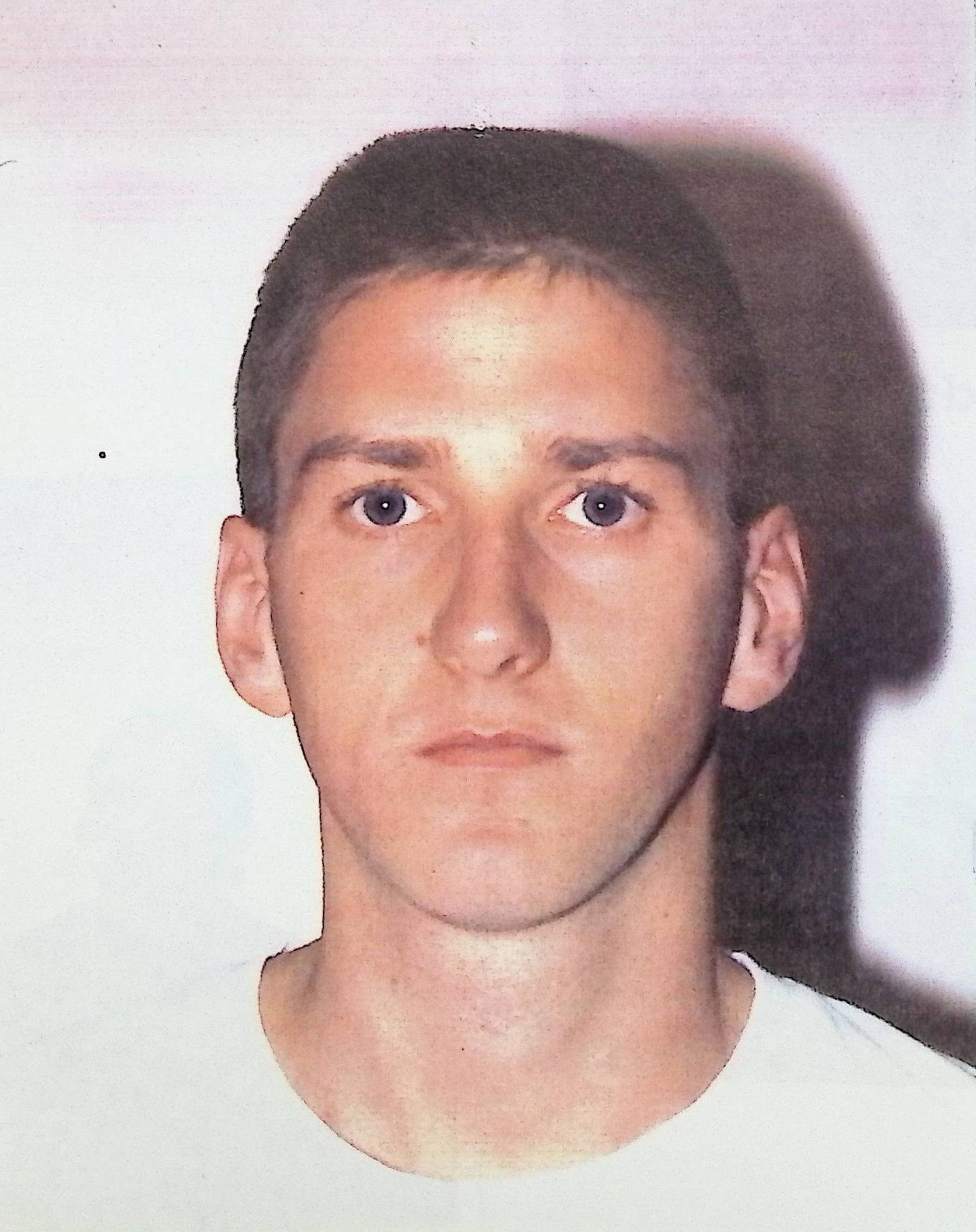
- FBI mug shot of McVeigh, 1995
- Born: Timothy James McVeigh; April 23, 1968; Lockport, New York, U.S.
- Died: June 11, 2001 (aged 33); Terre Haute, Indiana, U.S.
- Other names: Tim Tuttle; Daryl Bridges; Robert Kling
- Occupation: Soldier • security guard
- Known for: Perpetrator of the Oklahoma City bombing
- Status: Executed by lethal injection
- Motive: Anti-government sentiment; Retaliation for the Ruby Ridge, Waco siege, other government raids, U.S. foreign policy, Federal Assault Weapons Ban and civilian casualties from U.S. military attacks in foreign countries
- Convictions: First degree murder of a federal employee (18 u.s.c §§ 1111 and 1114) (8 counts); Use of a weapon of mass destruction resulting in death (18 u.s.c § 2332a); Conspiracy to use a weapon of mass destruction resulting in death (18 u.s.c § 2332a); Destruction by explosives resulting in death; (18 u.s.c § 844(f))
- Penalty: Death (August 14, 1997)
- Accomplices: Terry Nichols; Michael Fortier

Details
- Country: United States
- Location: Oklahoma City, Oklahoma
- Killed: 168–169: 167–168 direct; 1 indirect (Note: This figure does not include any people he may have killed while serving in the Gulf War.)
- Injured: 684
- Weapons: Ammonium nitrate and nitromethane truck bomb
- Military career
- Branch: U.S. Army
- Service years: 1988–1991
- Rank: Sergeant
- Conflicts: Gulf War

Timothy James McVeigh (April 23, 1968 – June 11, 2001) was an American mass murderer and domestic terrorist who masterminded and perpetrated the Oklahoma City bombing on April 19, 1995. The bombing itself killed 167 people (including 19 children), injured 684 people, and destroyed one-third of the Alfred P. Murrah Federal Building. A rescue worker was killed after the bombing when debris struck her head, bringing the total to 168 killed. It remains the deadliest act of domestic terrorism in U.S. history.

A Gulf War veteran, McVeigh became radicalized by antigovernment beliefs. He sought revenge against the United States federal government for the 1993 Waco siege, as well as the 1992 Ruby Ridge incident. McVeigh expressed particular disapproval of federal agencies such as the Bureau of Alcohol, Tobacco, and Firearms (ATF) and the Federal Bureau of Investigation (FBI) for their handling of issues regarding private citizens. He hoped to inspire a revolution against the federal government, and he defended the bombing as a legitimate tactic against what he saw as a tyrannical government. He was arrested shortly after the bombing and indicted on 160 state offenses and 11 federal offenses, including the use of a weapon of mass destruction. He was found guilty on all counts in 1997 and sentenced to death.

McVeigh was executed by lethal injection on June 11, 2001, at the Federal Correctional Complex in Terre Haute, Indiana. His execution, which took place just over six years after the offense and just under four years after his sentencing, was carried out in a considerably shorter time than for most inmates awaiting execution, due in part to his refusal to pursue appeals or stays of execution. McVeigh was the first inmate executed by the U.S. federal government since 1963.

== Early life ==
Timothy James McVeigh was born on April 23, 1968, in Lockport, New York, the only son and the second of three children of his Irish American parents, Noreen Mildred "Mickey" Hill and William McVeigh. In 1866, McVeigh's great-great-grandfather Edward McVeigh emigrated from Ireland and settled in Niagara County. After McVeigh's parents divorced when he was ten years old, he was raised by his father in Pendleton, New York.

Most who knew McVeigh remember him as being very shy and withdrawn while a few described him as an outgoing and playful child who withdrew as an adolescent. He is said to have had only one girlfriend as an adolescent; he later told journalists that when trying to impress women, he would always say the wrong thing.

While in high school McVeigh became interested in computers, and hacked into government computer systems on his Commodore 64 under the handle The Wanderer, taken from the song by Dion DiMucci. In his senior year he was named "most promising computer programmer" of Starpoint Central High School (as well as "Most Talkative" by his classmates as a joke as he did not speak much) but had relatively poor grades until his 1986 graduation.

He was introduced to firearms by his grandfather. McVeigh told people of his wish to become a gun shop owner and sometimes took firearms to school to impress his classmates. He became intensely interested in gun rights as well as the Second Amendment to the United States Constitution after he graduated from high school and read magazines such as Soldier of Fortune. He briefly attended Bryant & Stratton College before dropping out. After dropping out of college, McVeigh worked as an armored car guard and was noted by co-workers as being obsessed with guns. One co-worker recalled an instance when McVeigh came to work "looking like Pancho Villa" as he was wearing bandoliers.

== Military career ==
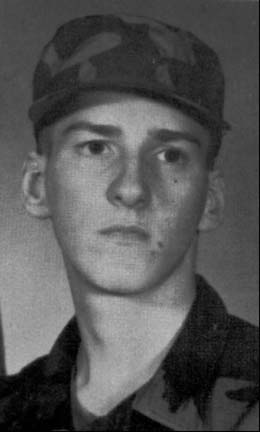
McVeigh's Army yearbook photo, 1988

In May 1988, at the age of 20, McVeigh enlisted in the United States Army and attended Basic Training and Advanced Individual Training at the U.S. Army Infantry School at Fort Benning, Georgia. While in the military, McVeigh used much of his spare time to read about firearms, sniper tactics, and explosives.

While in the military McVeigh sent $20 for a trial membership of the Ku Klux Klan, although he claimed he was not aware of most of their beliefs, and had been impressed with one of their pamphlets on gun rights. They offered a "White Power" T-shirt with membership, which McVeigh wanted because he felt there was a double-standard whereby black servicemen could wear "Black Power" T-shirts around a military installation. While he claimed to have never worn the shirt, he made no apologies for buying it. He later came to believe that the Klan was primarily racist rather than anti-government, and chose not to renew his membership at the end of the first year.

His future co-conspirator Terry Nichols was his platoon guide. He and Nichols quickly got along with their similar backgrounds as well as their views on gun collecting and survivalism. The two were later stationed together at Fort Riley in Junction City, Kansas, where they met and became friends with their future accomplice, Michael Fortier.

McVeigh was a top-scoring gunner with the M242 25mm cannon of the Bradley Fighting Vehicles used by the 1st Infantry Division and was promoted to sergeant. After being promoted, McVeigh earned a reputation for assigning undesirable work to black servicemen and using derogatory language, leading to talk around the base that he was a racist. He was stationed at Fort Riley before being deployed on Operation Desert Storm.

In an interview before his execution, McVeigh said that he hit an Iraqi tank more than 500 yards away on his first day in the war and then the Iraqis surrendered. He also decapitated an Iraqi soldier with cannon fire from 1,100 yards away. He said he was later shocked to see carnage on the road while leaving Kuwait City after U.S. troops routed the Iraqi Army. McVeigh received several service awards, including the Bronze Star Medal National Defense Service Medal, Southwest Asia Service Medal, Army Service Ribbon, and the Kuwaiti Liberation Medal.

McVeigh aspired to join the United States Army Special Forces (SF). After returning from the Gulf War, he entered the selection program, but withdrew on the second day of the 21-day assessment and selection course for the Special Forces, telling other recruits that he had injured an ankle. However, in a letter to his superiors, McVeigh wrote that he was not "physically ready". McVeigh decided to leave the Army and was honorably discharged in 1991.

== Post-military life ==
McVeigh wrote letters to local newspapers complaining about taxes. In 1992, he wrote to the Lockport Union-Sun & Journal:

Taxes are a joke. Regardless of what a political candidate "promises," they will increase. More taxes are always the answer to government mismanagement. They mess up. We suffer. Taxes are reaching cataclysmic levels, with no slowdown in sight. [...] Is a Civil War Imminent? Do we have to shed blood to reform the current system? I hope it doesn't come to that. But it might.

McVeigh also wrote to Representative John J. LaFalce (D–New York), complaining about the arrest of a woman for carrying mace:

It is a lie if we tell ourselves that the police can protect us everywhere at all times. Firearms restrictions are bad enough, but now a woman can't even carry Mace in her purse?

McVeigh later moved with Nichols to Nichols' brother James' farm around Decker, Michigan. While visiting friends, McVeigh reportedly complained that the Army had implanted a microchip into his buttocks so that the government could keep track of him. In a letter to Jennifer McVeigh, dated Oct. 20, 1993, he alleged that at Fort Bragg he and nine others were told they might be ordered to help the CIA "fly drugs into the U.S. to fund many covert operations" and to "work hand-in-hand with civilian police agencies" as "government-paid assassins," warning his sister "Do not spread this info, Jennifer, as you could (very honestly, seriously) endanger my life."

McVeigh worked long hours in a dead-end job and felt that he did not have a home. He sought romance, but his advances were rejected by a co-worker and he felt nervous around women. He believed that he brought too much pain to his loved ones. He grew angry and frustrated at his difficulties in finding a girlfriend. He took up obsessive gambling. Unable to pay gambling debts, he took a cash advance and then defaulted on his repayments. He began looking for a state with low taxes so that he could live without heavy government regulation or high taxes. He became enraged when the government told him that he had been overpaid $1,058 while in the Army and he had to pay back the money. He wrote an angry letter to the government, saying:

Go ahead, take everything I own; take my dignity. Feel good as you grow fat and rich at my expense; sucking my tax dollars and property.

McVeigh introduced his sister to antigovernment literature, but his father had little interest in these views. He moved out of his father's house and into an apartment that had no telephone. This made it impossible for his employer to contact him for overtime assignments. He quit the National Rifle Association of America (NRA), believing that it was too weak on gun rights.

=== 1993 Waco siege and gun shows ===
In 1993, McVeigh drove to Waco, Texas, during the Waco siege to show his support. At the scene, he distributed pro-gun rights literature and bumper stickers bearing slogans such as, "When guns are outlawed, I will become an outlaw." He told a student reporter:

The government is afraid of the guns people have because they have to have control of the people at all times. Once you take away the guns, you can do anything to the people. You give them an inch and they take a mile. I believe we are slowly turning into a socialist government. The government is continually growing bigger and more powerful, and the people need to prepare to defend themselves against government control.

For the five months following the Waco siege, McVeigh worked at gun shows and handed out free cards printed with the name and address of Lon Horiuchi, an FBI sniper, "in the hope that somebody in the Patriot movement would assassinate the sharpshooter." Horiuchi's actions while an FBI agent have drawn controversy, specifically his shooting and killing of Randy Weaver's wife while she held an infant child. McVeigh wrote hate mail to Horiuchi, suggesting that "what goes around, comes around". McVeigh later considered putting aside his plan to target the Murrah Building to target Horiuchi or a member of his family instead.

McVeigh became a fixture on the gun show circuit, traveling to forty states and visiting about eighty gun shows. He found that the further west he went, the more anti-government sentiment he encountered, at least until he got to what he called "The People's Socialist Republic of California." McVeigh sold survival items and copies of The Turner Diaries. One author said:

In the gun show culture, McVeigh found a home. Though he remained skeptical of some of the most extreme ideas being bandied around, he liked talking to people there about the United Nations, the federal government, and possible threats to American liberty.

=== Arizona with Fortier ===
McVeigh had a road atlas with hand-drawn designations of the most likely places for nuclear attacks and considered buying property in Seligman, Arizona, which he determined to be in a "nuclear-free zone." He lived with Michael Fortier in Kingman, Arizona, and the two became so close that he served as best man at Fortier's wedding. McVeigh experimented with cannabis and methamphetamine after first researching their effects in an encyclopedia. He was never as interested in drugs as Fortier was, and one of the reasons they parted ways was that McVeigh grew tired of Fortier's drug habits.

=== With Nichols, Waco siege, and radicalization ===
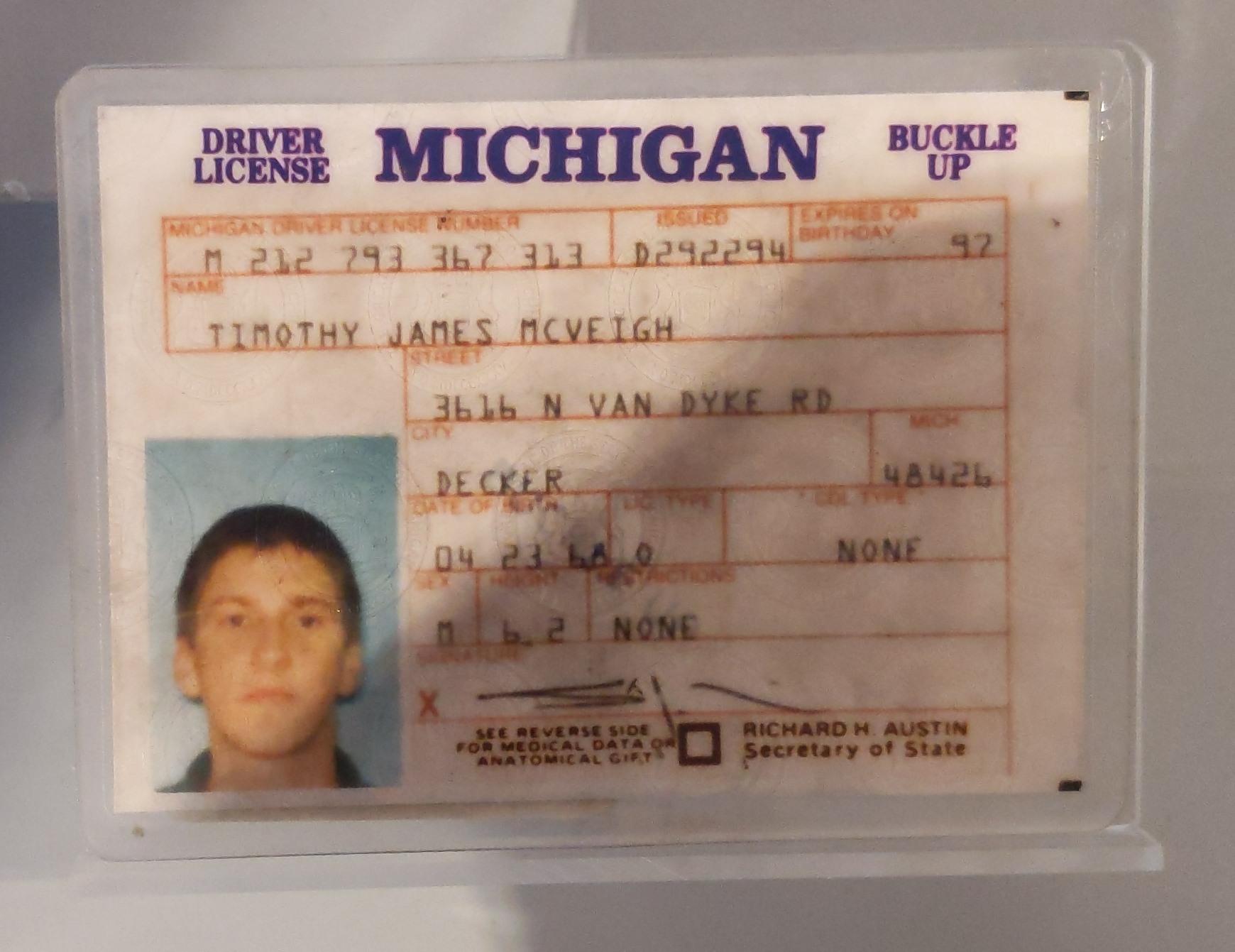
McVeigh's driver license in Michigan

In April 1993, McVeigh headed for a farm in Michigan where former roommate Terry Nichols lived. In between watching coverage of the Waco siege on TV, Nichols and his brother began teaching McVeigh how to make explosives by combining household chemicals in plastic jugs. The destruction of the Waco compound enraged McVeigh and convinced him that it was time to take action. He was particularly angered by the government's use of CS gas on women and children; he had been exposed to the gas as part of his military training and was familiar with its effects. The disappearance of certain evidence, such as the bullet-riddled steel-reinforced front door to the complex, led him to suspect a cover-up.

McVeigh's anti-government rhetoric became more radical. He began to sell Bureau of Alcohol, Tobacco, Firearms and Explosives (ATF) hats riddled with bullet holes, and a flare gun that he said could shoot down an "ATF helicopter". He produced videos detailing the government's actions at Waco and handed out pamphlets with titles such as "U.S. Government Initiates Open Warfare Against American People" and "Waco Shootout Evokes Memory of Warsaw '43." He began changing his answering machine greeting every couple of weeks to various quotes by Patrick Henry, such as "Give me liberty or give me death." He began experimenting with making pipe bombs and other small explosive devices. The government imposed new firearms restrictions in 1994 which McVeigh believed threatened his livelihood.

McVeigh dissociated himself from his boyhood friend Steve Hodge by sending him a 23-page farewell letter. He proclaimed his devotion to the United States Declaration of Independence, explaining in detail what each sentence meant to him. McVeigh declared that:

Those who betray or subvert the Constitution are guilty of sedition and/or treason, are domestic enemies and should and will be punished accordingly.

It also stands to reason that anyone who sympathizes with the enemy or gives aid or comfort to said enemy is likewise guilty. I have sworn to uphold and defend the Constitution against all enemies, foreign and domestic and I will. And I will because not only did I swear to, but I believe in what it stands for in every bit of my heart, soul and being.

I know in my heart that I am right in my struggle, Steve. I have come to peace with myself, my God and my cause. Blood will flow in the streets, Steve. Good vs. Evil. Free Men vs. Socialist Wannabe Slaves. Pray it is not your blood, my friend.

McVeigh felt the need to personally reconnoiter sites of rumored conspiracies. He visited Area 51 in order to defy government restrictions on photography and went to Gulfport, Mississippi, to determine the veracity of rumors about United Nations operations. These turned out to be false; the Russian vehicles on the site were being configured for use in U.N.-sponsored humanitarian aid efforts. Around this time, McVeigh and Nichols began making bulk purchases of ammonium nitrate, an agricultural fertilizer, for resale to survivalists, since rumors were circulating that the government was preparing to ban it.

== Plan against federal building or individuals ==
McVeigh told Fortier of his plans to blow up a federal building, but Fortier declined to participate. Fortier also told his wife about the plans. McVeigh composed two letters to the Bureau of Alcohol, Tobacco and Firearms, the first titled "Constitutional Defenders" and the second "ATF Read." He denounced government officials as "fascist tyrants" and "storm troopers," and warned:

ATF, all you tyrannical mother fuckers will swing in the wind one day for your treasonous actions against the Constitution of the United States. Remember the Nuremberg War Trials.

McVeigh also wrote a letter to recruit a customer named Steve Colbern:

A man with nothing left to lose is a very dangerous man and his energy/anger can be focused toward a common/righteous goal. What I'm asking you to do, then, is sit back and be honest with yourself. Do you have kids/wife? Would you back out at the last minute to care for the family? Are you interested in keeping your firearms for their current/future monetary value, or would you drag that '06 through rock, swamp and cactus... to get off the needed shot? In short, I'm not looking for talkers, I'm looking for fighters... And if you are a fed, think twice. Think twice about the Constitution you are supposedly enforcing (isn't "enforcing freedom" an oxymoron?) and think twice about catching us with our guard down – you will lose just like Degan did – and your family will lose.

McVeigh began announcing that he had progressed from the "propaganda" phase to the "action" phase. He wrote to his Michigan friend Gwenda Strider, "I have certain other 'militant' talents that are in short supply and greatly demanded."

McVeigh later said he considered "a campaign of individual assassination," with "eligible" targets including Attorney General Janet Reno, Judge Walter S. Smith Jr. of Federal District Court, who handled the Branch Davidian trial; and Lon Horiuchi, a member of the FBI hostage-rescue team, who shot and killed Vicki Weaver in a standoff at a remote cabin at Ruby Ridge, Idaho, in 1992. He said he wanted Reno to accept "full responsibility in deed, not just words." Such an assassination seemed too difficult, and he decided that since federal agents had become soldiers, he should strike at them at their command centers. According to McVeigh's authorized biography, he decided that he could make the loudest statement by bombing a federal building. After the bombing, he was ambivalent about his act and the deaths he caused; as he said in letters to his hometown newspaper, he sometimes wished that he had carried out a series of assassinations against police and government officials instead.

== Oklahoma City bombing ==
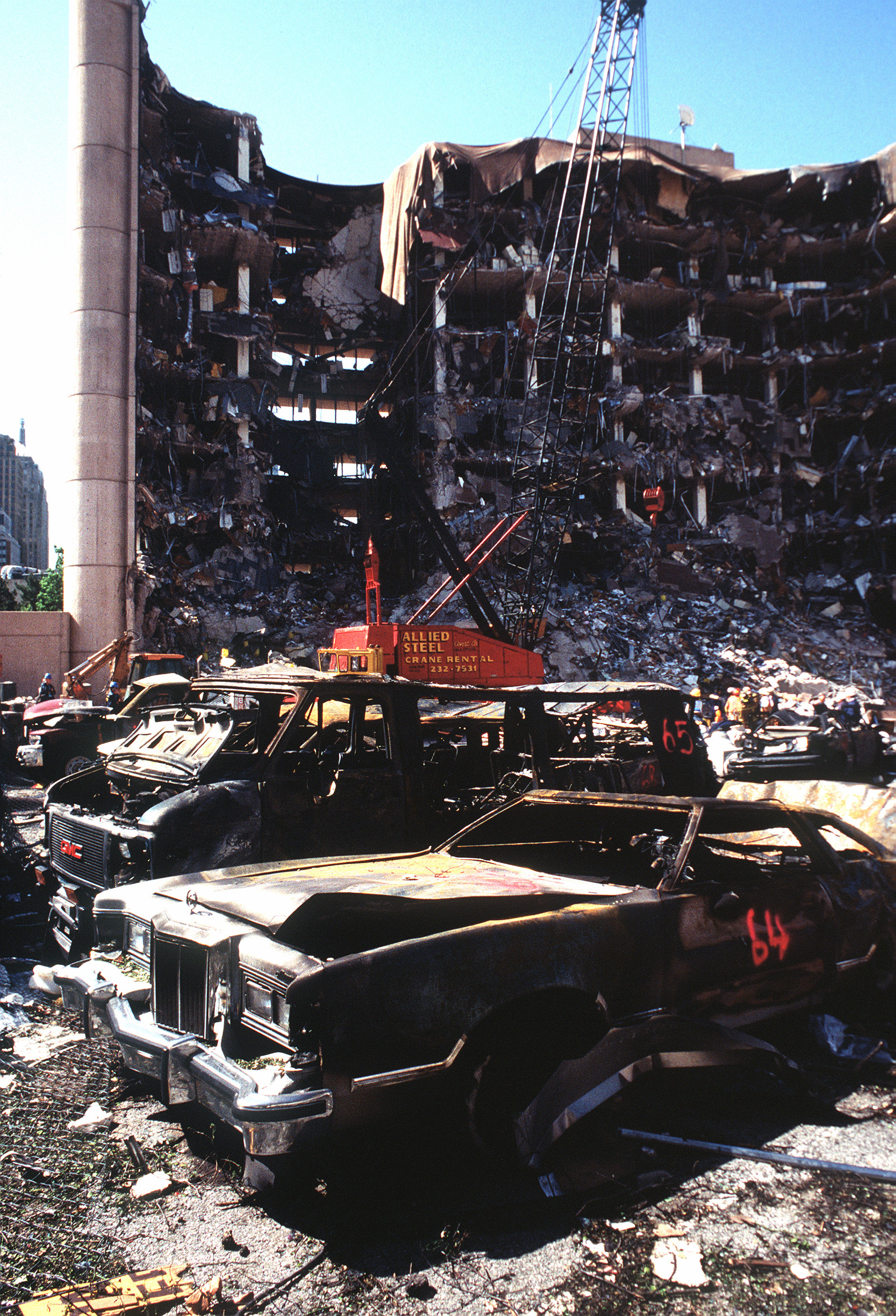
The Alfred P. Murrah Federal Building two days after the Oklahoma City bombing

Working at a lakeside campground near McVeigh's old Army post, he and Nichols constructed an ANFO explosive device mounted in the back of a rented Ryder truck. The bomb consisted of about 5,000 pounds (2,300 kg) of ammonium nitrate and nitromethane.

On April 19, 1995, McVeigh drove the truck to the front of the Alfred P. Murrah Federal Building just as its offices opened for the day. Before arriving, he stopped to light a two-minute fuse. At 09:02, a large explosion destroyed the north half of the building. It killed 168 people, including 19 children in the day care center on the second floor, and injured 684 others.

McVeigh said that he had not known that there was a daycare center on the second floor, and that he might have chosen a different target if he had known about it. Nichols said that he and McVeigh did know about the daycare center in the building, and that they did not care.

McVeigh's biographers, Lou Michel and Dan Herbeck, spoke with McVeigh in interviews totaling 75 hours. He said about the victims:

To these people in Oklahoma who have lost a loved one, I'm sorry but it happens every day. You're not the first mother to lose a kid, or the first grandparent to lose a grandson or a granddaughter. It happens every day, somewhere in the world. I'm not going to go into that courtroom, curl into a fetal ball and cry just because the victims want me to do that.

During an interview in 2000 with Ed Bradley for television news magazine 60 Minutes, Bradley asked McVeigh for his reaction to the deaths of the nineteen children. McVeigh said:

I thought it was terrible that there were children in the building.

According to the Oklahoma City Memorial Institute for the Prevention of Terrorism (MIPT), more than 300 buildings in the city were damaged. More than 12,000 volunteers and rescue workers took part in the rescue, recovery and support operations following the bombing. In reference to theories that McVeigh had assistance from others, he responded with a well-known line from the film A Few Good Men, "You can't handle the truth!" He added, "Because the truth is, I blew up the Murrah Building and isn't it kind of scary that one man could wreak this kind of hell?"

=== Arrest and trial ===
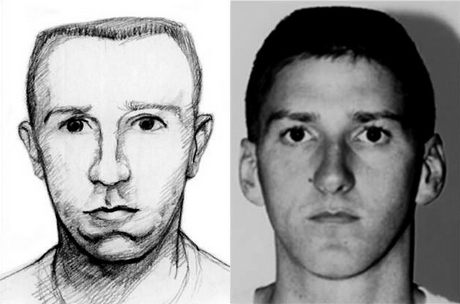
FBI forensic sketch compared to mug shot of McVeigh

By tracing the vehicle identification number of a rear axle found in the wreckage, the FBI identified the vehicle as a Ryder rental box truck rented from Junction City, Kansas. Workers at the agency assisted an FBI artist in creating a sketch of the renter, who had used the alias "Robert Kling". The sketch was shown in the area. Lea McGown, manager of the local Dreamland Motel, identified the sketch as Timothy McVeigh.

Shortly after the bombing, while driving on Interstate 35 in Noble County, near Perry, Oklahoma, McVeigh was stopped by State Trooper Charles J. Hanger. Hanger had passed McVeigh's yellow 1977 Mercury Marquis and noticed that it had no license plate. McVeigh admitted to the state trooper – who noticed a bulge under his jacket – that he had a gun; the trooper arrested him for driving without plates and possessing an illegal firearm. McVeigh's concealed weapon permit was not legal in Oklahoma. McVeigh was wearing a shirt at that time with a picture of Abraham Lincoln and the motto sic semper tyrannis ('Thus always to tyrants'), the supposed words shouted by John Wilkes Booth after he shot Lincoln. On the back, it had a tree with a picture of three blood droplets and the Thomas Jefferson quote, "The tree of liberty must be refreshed from time to time with the blood of patriots and tyrants." Three days later, McVeigh was identified as the subject of the nationwide manhunt.

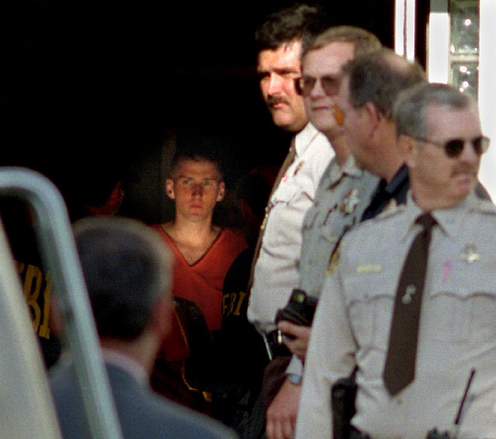
McVeigh about to be led out of a Perry, Oklahoma, courthouse two days after the bombing

On August 10, 1995, McVeigh was indicted on 11 federal counts, including conspiracy to use a weapon of mass destruction, use of a weapon of mass destruction, destruction with the use of explosives, and eight counts of first degree murder for the deaths of law enforcement officers. On February 20, 1996, the Court granted a change of venue and ordered that the case be transferred from Oklahoma City to the District Court in Denver, to be presided over by District Judge Richard Paul Matsch.

McVeigh instructed his lawyers to use a necessity defense, but they ended up not doing so. They would have had to prove that McVeigh was in "imminent danger" from the government. McVeigh argued that "imminent" did not necessarily mean "immediate". They would have argued that his bombing of the Murrah building was a justifiable response to what McVeigh believed were the crimes of the U.S. government at Waco, Texas, where the 51-day siege of the Branch Davidian complex resulted in the deaths of 76 Branch Davidians. As part of the defense, McVeigh's lawyers showed the jury the controversial video Waco, the Big Lie.

On June 2, 1997, McVeigh was found guilty on all 11 counts of the federal indictment. Although 168 people, including 19 children, were killed in the April 19, 1995, bombing, murder charges were brought against McVeigh for only the eight federal agents who were on duty when the bomb destroyed much of the Murrah Building. Along with the eight counts of murder, McVeigh was charged with conspiracy to use a weapon of mass destruction, and destroying a federal building. Oklahoma City District Attorney Bob Macy said he would file state charges in the other 160 murders after McVeigh's co-defendant, Terry Nichols, was tried. After the verdict, McVeigh tried to calm his mother by saying, "Think of it this way. When I was in the Army, you didn't see me for years. Think of me that way now, like I'm away in the Army again, on an assignment for the military."

On June 13, the jury recommended that McVeigh be sentenced to death. The U.S. Department of Justice brought federal charges against McVeigh for causing the deaths of eight federal officers leading to a possible death penalty for McVeigh; they could not bring charges against McVeigh for the remaining 160 deaths in federal court because those deaths fell under the jurisdiction of the State of Oklahoma. Because McVeigh was convicted and sentenced to death, the State of Oklahoma did not file murder charges against McVeigh for the other 160 deaths. Before the sentence was formally pronounced by Judge Matsch, McVeigh addressed the court for the first time and said: "If the Court please, I wish to use the words of Justice Louis Brandeis dissenting in Olmstead v. United States to speak for me. He wrote, 'Our Government is the potent, the omnipresent teacher. For good or for ill, it teaches the whole people by its example.' That's all I have."

=== Motivations for the bombing ===
McVeigh claimed that the bombing was revenge against the government for the sieges at Waco and Ruby Ridge. McVeigh visited Waco during the standoff. While there, he was interviewed by student reporter Michelle Rauch, a senior journalism major at Southern Methodist University who was writing for the school paper. McVeigh expressed his objections over what was happening there.

McVeigh frequently quoted and alluded to the white supremacist novel The Turner Diaries; he claimed to appreciate its interest in firearms. Photocopies of pages sixty-one and sixty-two of The Turner Diaries were found in an envelope inside McVeigh's car. These pages depicted a fictitious mortar attack upon the U.S. Capitol in Washington.

In a 1,200-word essay dated March 1998, from the federal maximum-security prison at Florence, Colorado, McVeigh claimed that the terrorist bombing was "morally equivalent" to U.S. military actions against Iraq and other foreign countries. The handwritten essay, submitted to and published by the alternative national news magazine Media Bypass, was distributed worldwide by the Associated Press on May 29, 1998. This was written in the midst of the 1998 Iraq disarmament crisis and a few months before Operation Desert Fox.

On April 26, 2001, McVeigh wrote a letter to Fox News, "I Explain Herein Why I Bombed the Murrah Federal Building in Oklahoma City", which explicitly laid out his reasons for the attack. McVeigh read the novel Unintended Consequences (1996), and said that if it had come out a few years earlier, he would have given serious consideration to using sniper attacks in a war of attrition against the government instead of bombing a federal building.

=== Accomplices ===
McVeigh's accomplice Terry Nichols was convicted and sentenced in federal court to life in prison for his role in the crime. At Nichols' trial, evidence was presented indicating that others may have been involved. Several residents of central Kansas, including real estate agent Georgia Rucker and a retired Army NCO, testified at Terry Nichols' federal trial that they had seen two trucks at Geary Lake State Park, where prosecutors alleged the bomb was assembled. The retired NCO said he visited the lake on April 18, 1995, but left after a group of surly men looked at him aggressively. The operator of the Dreamland Motel testified that two Ryder trucks had been parked outside her Grandview Plaza motel where McVeigh stayed in Room 26 the weekend before the bombing. Terry Nichols is incarcerated at ADX Florence in Florence, Colorado.

Michael and Lori Fortier were also considered accomplices, due to their foreknowledge of the bombing. In addition to Michael assisting McVeigh in scouting the federal building, Lori had helped McVeigh laminate a fake driver's license which was used to rent the Ryder truck. Michael agreed to testify against McVeigh and Nichols in exchange for a reduced sentence and immunity for his wife. He was sentenced on May 27, 1998, to twelve years in prison and fined $75,000 for failing to warn authorities about the bombing. On January 20, 2006, Fortier was released for good behavior into the Witness Protection Program and given a new identity.

An ATF informant, Carol Howe, told reporters that shortly before the bombing she had warned her handlers that guests of the private community of Elohim City, Oklahoma, were planning a major bombing attack. McVeigh was issued a speeding ticket there at the same time. Other than this speeding ticket, there is no evidence of a connection between McVeigh and members of the Midwest Bank Robbers at Elohim City.

Some witnesses claimed to have seen a second suspect, and there was a search for a "John Doe #2", but none was ever found.

=== Incarceration and execution ===
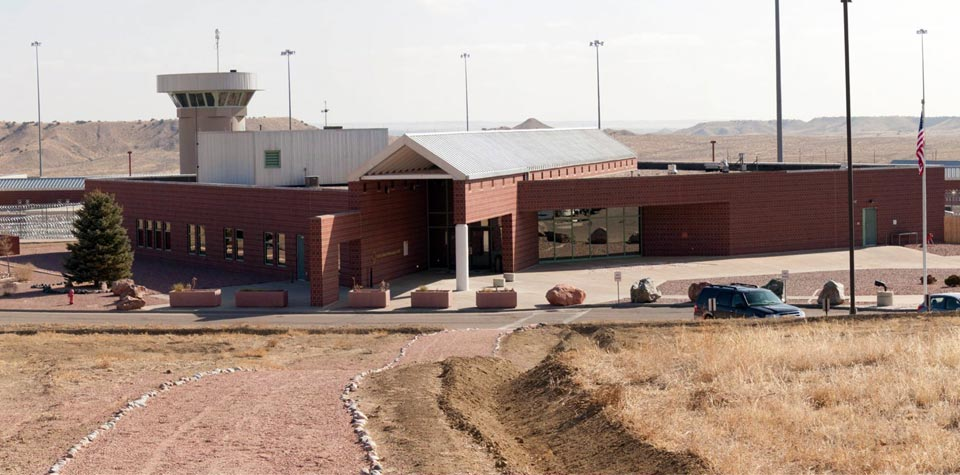
McVeigh was held at USP Florence ADMAX in Colorado until 1999.

McVeigh's death sentence was delayed pending an appeal. One of his appeals for certiorari, taken to the Supreme Court of the United States, was denied on March 8, 1999. McVeigh's request for a nationally televised execution was also denied. Entertainment Network Inc., an Internet company that produces adult-themed websites, unsuccessfully sued for the right to broadcast the execution. At USP Florence ADMAX, McVeigh and Nichols were housed in what was known as "bomber's row". Ted Kaczynski, Luis Felipe, and Ramzi Yousef were also housed in this cell block. Yousef made frequent, unsuccessful attempts to convert McVeigh to Islam.

The day before his execution, McVeigh said in a letter to The Buffalo News: "I am sorry these people had to lose their lives, but that's the nature of the beast. It's understood going in what the human toll will be." An agnostic, he said that if there turned out to be an afterlife, he would "improvise, adapt and overcome", noting: "If there is a hell, then I'll be in good company with a lot of fighter pilots who also had to bomb innocents to win the war." He also said: "I knew I wanted this before it happened. I knew my objective was state-assisted suicide and when it happens, it's in your face. You just did something you're trying to say should be illegal for medical personnel."

The Federal Bureau of Prisons (BOP) transferred McVeigh from USP Florence ADMAX to the federal death row at USP Terre Haute in Terre Haute, Indiana, in 1999. McVeigh dropped his remaining appeals, saying that he would rather die than spend the rest of his life in prison. On January 16, 2001, the BOP set May 16 as McVeigh's execution date. McVeigh said that his only regret was not completely destroying the federal building. Six days prior to his scheduled execution, the FBI turned over thousands of documents of evidence it had previously withheld to McVeigh's attorneys. As a result, U.S. attorney general John Ashcroft announced McVeigh's execution would be stayed for one month. The execution date was reset for June 11. McVeigh also requested a Catholic chaplain. His last meal consisted of two pints of mint chocolate chip ice cream.

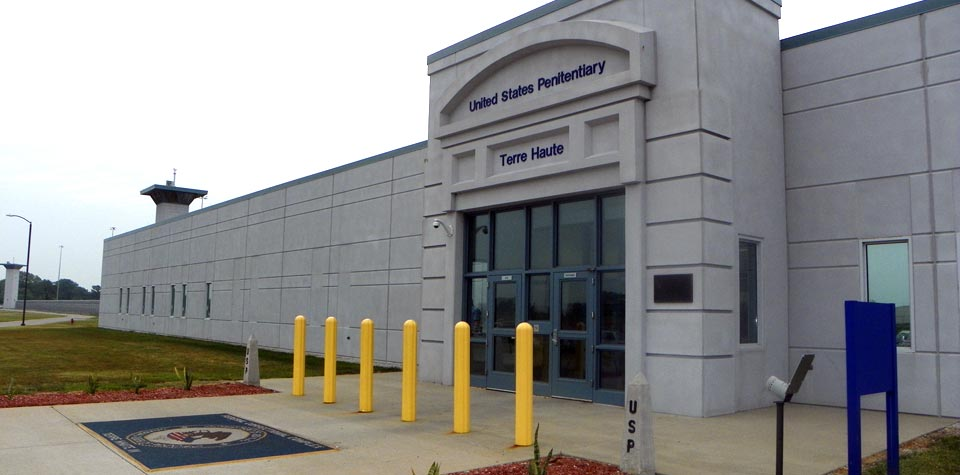
McVeigh was held on federal death row at USP Terre Haute in Indiana after 1999.

McVeigh chose William Ernest Henley's 1875 poem "Invictus" as his final written statement. Just before the execution, when he was asked if he had a final statement, he declined. Jay Sawyer, a relative of one of the victims, wrote, "Without saying a word, he got the final word." Larry Whicher, whose brother died in the attack, described McVeigh as having "a totally expressionless, blank stare. He had a look of defiance and that if he could, he'd do it all over again." McVeigh was executed by lethal injection at 7:14 a.m. on June 11, 2001, the first person to be executed by the United States federal government since Victor Feguer was executed in Iowa on March 15, 1963.

McVeigh stated that he had "religious, ethical and philosophical objections" to an autopsy. A letter to his hometown paper, The Buffalo News, reads "I was sentenced to death, not to death and disembowelment." The authorities granted him his wish.

On November 21, 1997, President Bill Clinton had signed S. 923, special legislation introduced by Senator Arlen Specter to bar McVeigh and other veterans convicted of capital crimes from being buried in any military cemetery. His body was cremated at Mattox Ryan Funeral Home in Terre Haute. His ashes were given to his lawyer, who said "the final destination of McVeigh's remains would remain privileged forever." McVeigh had written that he considered having them dropped at the site of the memorial where the building once stood, but decided that would be "too vengeful, too raw, too cold." He had expressed willingness to donate organs, but was prohibited from doing so by prison regulations. Psychiatrist John Smith concluded that McVeigh was "a decent person who had allowed rage to build up inside him to the point that he had lashed out in one terrible, violent act." McVeigh's IQ was assessed at 126.

After his execution, a decoy hearse was used as a security measure. A spokeswoman for the Terre Haute penitentiary in Indiana said they wanted to avoid a potential ambush of the motorcade.

== Associations ==
According to CNN, his only known associations were as a registered Republican while in Buffalo, New York, in the 1980s, and a membership in the National Rifle Association while in the Army.

While in the military, he signed up for a trial membership in the Ku Klux Klan, although he did not ultimately continue with the Klan. There is no conclusive evidence that he ever belonged to any other extremist groups.

== Religious beliefs ==
McVeigh was raised Roman Catholic. During his childhood, he and his father attended Mass regularly. McVeigh was confirmed at the Good Shepherd Church in Pendleton, New York, in 1985. In a 1996 interview, McVeigh professed belief in "a God", although he said he had "sort of lost touch with" Catholicism and "I never really picked it up, however I do maintain core beliefs." In McVeigh's biography American Terrorist, released in 2002, he stated that he did not believe in a hell and that science is his religion. In June 2001, a day before the execution, McVeigh wrote a letter to the Buffalo News identifying himself as agnostic. However, he took the last rites, administered by a priest, just before his execution. Father Charles Smith ministered to McVeigh in his last moments on death row.

== In popular culture ==
In the 2023 historical drama miniseries Waco: The Aftermath, McVeigh is portrayed by Alex Breaux.

In 2024, HBO produced the documentary An American Bombing: The Road to April 19.

In the 2024 film McVeigh, he is played by Alfie Allen.

== See also ==
- Capital punishment by the United States federal government
- Capital punishment in the United States
- List of people executed by the United States federal government
- List of people executed in the United States in 2001
- Volunteer (capital punishment)

Executions carried out by the United States federal government
| Preceded by Victor Feguer March 15, 1963 | Timothy McVeigh; June 11, 2001 | Succeeded by Juan Garza June 19, 2001 |
Executions carried out in the United States
| Preceded by Vincent Allen Johnson – Oklahoma May 29, 2001 | Timothy McVeigh – Federal government June 11, 2001 | Succeeded by John Leslie Wheat – Texas June 13, 2001 |
