= The Silent Brotherhood (book) =

1989 book by Kevin Flynn and Gary Gerhardt

- Cover of the first edition
- Author: Kevin Flynn and Gary Gerhardt
- Language: English
- Subject: The Order
- Published: The Free Press (1989); Signet (1990); Simon & Schuster (2024)
- Publication place: United States
- Media type: Print (hardcover and paperback)
- Pages: 419
- ISBN: 0-02-910312-6
- OCLC: 19554887
- Dewey Decimal: 322.4
- LC Class: HV6432.5.S57 F58 1989

The Silent Brotherhood: Inside America's Racist Underground is a 1989 book by Kevin Flynn and Gary Gerhardt about The Order, a neo-Nazi group led by Robert Jay Mathews, their crimes, and the resulting investigation. Both authors were journalists for the Denver newspaper Rocky Mountain News, and had started investigating the group in 1984, shortly after the Order's murder of the Jewish radio host Alan Berg. To research the book, the authors interviewed several members of the Order, law enforcement agents, and relatives and friends of those involved. It was first published in hardcover and paperback format in 1989 by The Free Press.

The book was a commercial success. It received a new paperback edition from Signet the next year under the title The Silent Brotherhood: The Chilling Inside Story of America's Violent, Anti-Government Militia Movement, which was reissued again after the Oklahoma City bombing in 1995. After two failed attempts to adapt the book into a film in the 1990s, The Silent Brotherhood was adapted into the 2024 film The Order. With the film's release, the book was republished in 2024 by Simon & Schuster as The Order: Inside America's Racist Underground.

The book received a generally positive reception, though some criticisms were levied about its writing style. It received praise from critics and academics for its information and research on the group, as well as its portrait of Mathews; several called it the most comprehensive or definitive book on the Order. Terrorism scholars Mark S. Hamm and Cécile Van de Voorde described it as "a book without peer" in the terrorism literature.

== Background ==
=== The Order ===
The Order was a neo-Nazi organization founded by Robert Jay Mathews. The group was called The Silent Brotherhood for most of its existence, but largely called another name they used, the Order, by the media; Flynn argued that this was because that name "fit better in a newspaper headline". The group committed a series of high-profile murders, robberies (stealing over $4 million), and bombings in an effort to eventually overthrow the American government, which they called the "Zionist Occupation Government". They gave money to other white racist groups, trying to convince them to move to the Pacific Northwest, where they aimed to establish a white ethnostate.

On June 18, 1984, the Order assassinated the controversial Denver radio talk show host Alan Berg. Berg was ethnically Jewish, known for ridiculing racists on his show, and had argued with a member of the Order, David Lane, on the air. Berg's assassination resulted in large amounts of media coverage, where before they had attracted little attention. A member of the order, Tom Martinez, became an informant, contributing to their downfall. The Order members went on the run. On December 8, 1984, Matthews died after a shootout with the Federal Bureau of Investigation, where they set the house he was hiding out in on fire. Other members of the group were hunted down, arrested, and sentenced.

=== The authors and investigation ===
The authors Kevin Flynn and Gary Gerhardt were both journalists for the Denver newspaper Rocky Mountain News. Gerhardt had graduated from Western State College. Flynn had previously been an editor for the Gloucester County Times, and had graduated from La Salle University with a philosophy degree. After Berg's assassination, the Rocky Mountain News sent a team of journalists to investigate, led by Flynn, Gerhardt, and John Accola, three of their most valued journalists. The trio traveled across the United States to investigate the case. As part of their investigation and in writing the book, they interviewed several far-right activists, including Richard Girnt Butler. They also interviewed the families of both Berg and Mathews.

As part of their research, the authors found it intriguing how average the people they were investigating could be, and that most of the members of the Order had no criminal background. Flynn said:

When we went to the Aryan Nation and talked to Richard Butler, everyone was very open to us because I think they sensed that we really wanted to know who these people were, and that we wanted to understand them. Because what intrigued us the most was that most of these folks, with a few exceptions, had no criminal records. They were simply people you might see walking down the street dealing with everyday stuff — like Bruce Pierce struggling with staying employed and feeding his family.

Most journalists largely ceased investigating after the February 1986 sentencing of Order members, but Flynn and his associates kept investigating for several years.

=== Textual history ===
By 1985, Flynn and Gerhardt were considering a book. However, having little more than the newspaper stories of the time, they were unsuccessful. Flynn attempted multiple times to offer the story as a book, receiving at least 19 rejection letters in response. They were later able to investigate and interview people close to the case, including members of the Order. When another writer mentioned to Flynn that a literary agent had suggested to him he write a book on it, but that he did not have the time, Flynn was referred to the literary agent instead. Gerhardt and Flynn received a US$15,000 advance for it from The Free Press, which they used to travel and continue their research; they also bought new computers and hired someone to transcribe for them. Accola was originally also involved in the book, but dropped out early on after losing interest in the project.

They were able to interview six members of the group, including Bruce Pierce and Richard Scutari, as well as Mathews' mother and his mistress. Pierce expressed no regrets. They also utilized court records to investigate for the book, as well as interviews with friends, FBI agents and law enforcement officials on the case, including Wayne Manis. Flynn called the process of researching for the book "a reality check"; he argued that had they not met Mathews, most of his followers would likely have led normal lives and would instead "be sitting in their living rooms complaining about communism".

Flynn said that the "most fun" part of writing the book was specifically answering the question of how Mathews became how he was and his personality. He also wrote that they had intended the book to be non-judgmental, but also not sympathetic; he said "it's not necessary to club readers over the head", and that they had aimed to "de-sensationalize" the Order. In an interview, he said "we're copying TV movies. We could have written an essay about racism in America, but we didn't want to. There was a story to be told about human beings. The point [...] was to display the various personalities."

Gerhardt retired from journalism in 2007, and died in 2015 aged 73. Flynn wrote another book, The Unmasking: Married to a Rapist, in 1993. Flynn became a city councilman of Denver in 2015.

== Contents ==
The Silent Brotherhood is dedicated to the authors' wives and families. In a prologue, "The Underground", they begin with a confrontation shortly prior to the death of Mathews between Wayne Manis, an FBI officer working on the case, and a member of the Order. They then give an overview on the history of the Order and the media and legal response to the group, and his memorialization by other white racist activists. The content of the book is factual, but some dialogue is hypothetical or fictionalized in nature. It is mostly presented in chronological order.

The book, especially its first half, largely focuses on Mathews; the main section begins with the origins and early life of Mathews. It covers Mathews's early upbringing, and how, at the age of 11, he joined the right-wing John Birch Society, and later became a Mormon and a member of the tax resistance movement; however, he did not express racist sentiments at the time. His parents did not agree with his political views and were not far-right extremists. After experiencing legal issues and dropping out of high school, Mathews moved to Idaho, with a promise to his parents to abandon extremism. The authors then discuss Richard Girnt Butler of the Aryan Nations, a preacher of a white supremacist branch of Christianity, Christian Identity. Mathews, meanwhile, became influenced by the white supremacist book Which Way Western Man? by William Gayley Simpson, and the neo-Nazi National Alliance. Mathews became a white supremacist, and a follower of Butler.

Mathews became frustrated with what he perceived as the unwillingness to "act" among other white supremacists, particularly Butler. He established the Order, though it went by several different names and was only ever called "the Order" for a short time; their tactics, name, and goals, were patterned off of the group of the same name in The Turner Diaries. The authors argue that Mathews was the driving, charismatic force of the Order. The second half of the book covers the crimes committed by the Order and the resulting investigation. They committed robberies and murders, committed to finance and instigate this Aryan revolution. They aimed to sabotage major cities. The authors argue that the members of the Order did not fit stereotypes of right-wing extremists, largely lacking criminal records and seeming fairly ordinary, and that the Order in generally was poorly organized and poorly orchestrated their crimes. The authors give biographical information on several members of the Order. The final confrontation between Mathews and the FBI killed Mathews, and most of the remaining members of the Order received extensive prison sentences. The book ends with the aftermath of the events for Mathews's family, and a list of the fates of all involved.

== Publication history ==
The Silent Brotherhood was first published in 1989 in hardcover and paperback format as The Silent Brotherhood: Inside America's Racist Underground by The Free Press in New York. This edition was 419 pages long. The book received a new paperback edition from Signet under the title The Silent Brotherhood: The Chilling Inside Story of America's Violent, Anti-Government Militia Movement. To promote the book, Flynn and Gerhardt went on two press tours, including to several cities in Idaho. Flynn also wrote to criminal justice departments at several colleges, encouraging them largely successfully to add his book to their reading lists on their courses. He was quoted as saying that he hoped the book shook up previously established stereotypes of the far-right.

The book was a commercial success, and initially sold about 20,000 copies; the authors found this satisfying, having aimed for a target audience of sociologists and criminologists rather than the general reader. In response to the 1995 Oklahoma City bombing, Signet reissued the book again that year in a paperback print run of 100,000 copies.

According to Flynn, the surviving members of the Order loved the book. The book was also utilized by some neo-Nazis and white supremacists. The Aryan Republican Army took influence from the book; according to scholar Mark S. Hamm, it served as a core text for them and was part of the textual basis of their organization. Multiple copies were found in the possession of a member of the Aryan Republican Army when they were raided by the FBI. Chevie Kehoe and Andreas Strassmeir also saw it as an influence; Timothy McVeigh, the perpetrator of the Oklahoma City bombing, had read the book, and gave his accomplice Michael Fortier a copy.

=== Adaptions ===
The book was a source for a 1992 play about the Order, God's Country. The film rights to The Silent Brotherhood were sold in 1993 to an independent filmmaker. However, the project failed to find funding. They sold the film rights again in the 1990s; this project also failed to be funded. In late 2017, for a third time, Flynn was contacted about the film rights by a movie producer. Gerhardt's widow and Flynn later agreed to a contract that would allow them to assemble a movie deal; after several years of renewals the film adaption secured funding in December 2022.

This became the 2024 film The Order, starring Nicholas Hoult as Mathews and Jude Law as a fictional FBI agent. Law also produced the film. It was released in theaters in the United States on December 6, 2024. With the film's release in 2024, the book was republished in a new edition as The Order: Inside America's Racist Underground. This edition is 419 pages and was published by Simon & Schuster. After the film's world premiere at the 81st Venice International Film Festival, Flynn buried a portion of Gerhardt's ashes outside the festival's grounds, as requested by his widow.

== Reception ==
The book received praise from reviewers for its information, research, and comprehensiveness, which reviewers said was thorough and with a high attention to detail. Several academics and reviewers described The Silent Brotherhood as the definitive or most comprehensive book on the Order. Academic George Michael noted it as such, while Mark S. Hamm called it "authoritative". Terrorism scholars Mark S. Hamm and Cécile Van de Voorde called it "a book without peer" in the terrorism literature, owing to "outstanding research". The Houston Chronicle said it was the "best account yet" of the Order, while Kennell Jackson Jr., writing for the San Francisco Chronicle, wrote it was "remarkable, both for the high quality of information and its driving narrative".

Praise was directed at its depiction of Matthews, who reviewers noted as the "central figure" of the narrative. Several reviewers commended the prologue. Jackson said the authors were "at their best when they take the reader into the internal logic of the Brotherhood, a universe of white supremacy ideas described in a paranoid vocabulary". The historian Leonard Dinnerstein said it was "a good cops-and-robbers chase"; he said the second half focusing on the crimes was much better than the section on Mathews. Bridgette M. Daniels said it failed to give insight on why members of the Order found Matthews to be so persuasive, while some reviewers felt it failed to address why the members of the Order had committed their crimes. Flynn noted that the book received positive from reviews from, simultaneously, "both a neo-Nazi group in Oregon and a communist organization in Atlanta".

The writing style received a more mixed reception than the information. Daniels was more critical, saying the book did not deliver on its prologue and was at times bland in terms of writing style, but called it necessary reading. Another reviewer called its style "blunt", or "dull" and "dry", though another called it occasionally overwritten in style. The Los Angeles Times called it a "page-turner" and "essential reading for every American", a reviewer for The Plain Dealer praised it as readable, while another reviewer complimented the writing as "riveting", saying that it "reads like the finest fiction, as suspenseful as it is insightful". They wrote the book had a kind of ironic humor permeating the story. Another reviewer complained that there were so many names and similar backgrounds it was difficult to remember and tell them apart. In an essay on the text, the scholar Vivian Wagner assessed the book as a novel in form; she noted it as thematically anxious about boundaries, especially in its focus of how someone like Mathews could become a fascist, and between fascists and non-fascists.

Several reviewers called the book disturbing, unsettling, or frightening, particularly in its portrayal of how seemingly normal men could commit such crimes. A reviewer for The Arizona Republic said reading it made one feel "uncomfortable and unsafe", while another said it generated a "subtle and lingering fear". Dan Popkey for Gannett wrote that it was an "enlightening and sometimes eerie read", while a reviewer for The Plain Dealer called it "morbidly entertaining".
