= Betrayed (1988 film) =

American spy thriller film by Costa-Gavras

- Theatrical release poster
- Directed by: Costa-Gavras
- Written by: Joe Eszterhas
- Produced by: Irwin Winkler
- Starring: Debra Winger; Tom Berenger; John Heard; John Mahoney
- Cinematography: Patrick Blossier
- Edited by: Joële Van Effenterre
- Music by: Bill Conti
- Production companies: CST Telecommunications Co.; Winkler Films; United Artists
- Distributed by: MGM/UA Communications Company
- Release date: August 26, 1988
- Running time: 127 minutes
- Country: United States
- Language: English
- Budget: $19 million
- Box office: $25.8 million

Betrayed is a 1988 American spy thriller film directed by Costa-Gavras, written by Joe Eszterhas, and starring Debra Winger and Tom Berenger. The plot is roughly based upon the terrorist activities of American neo-Nazi and white supremacist Robert Mathews and his group The Order.

== Plot ==
Set in the American Midwest, the film begins with the murder of a Jewish radio host in Chicago. FBI undercover agent Catherine Weaver, alias Katie Phillips, sets out to infiltrate a farming community, suspected of harboring those responsible.

After receiving a warm welcome from land-owner and farmer Gary Simmons, his two children and extended family, she begins to believe that the FBI lead is erroneous. Throwing caution to the wind, she falls in love with Simmons, a Vietnam War veteran who appears to command the respect of the local community. A short while later, her suspicions are aroused by talk of family secrets and as more chilling events unfold. One night Gary takes Katie hunting, where she meets with a huge group of white men and women who have brought a black shirtless man. They give the man a gun with 10 bullets and order him to run in the forest to save himself while they prey on him. When caught exhausted and unarmed, the group suggests Katie kill him but she does not. The man is killed and Katie informs the FBI, but is sent back to gather more evidence.

Gary's family goes on a picnic with other families where they are training everyone and schooling kids to harbor hate against Jews and people of color. The group's next plan is to rob a bank in Chicago where Katie accompanies them and during the robbery shoots a guard. The guard is saved but one member of the clan is shot and killed. Katie's next assignment is to identify the person whose campaign will be funded by the stolen money. While she tries to get that information out of Gary, he finds out her true identity yet takes her with him on his last assignment. Katie tries to inform the FBI but fails.

During the trip, Katie tries to stop Gary from shooting a political figure. Gary tells Katie he knows her true name and history. Katie pulls her gun from her purse and tells Gary he’s under arrest. As he aims at the political figure with his rifle, Katie warns him to drop his gun. He fails to do and Katie shoots and kills Gary. She quits the FBI and later visits Gary's family.

== Cast ==
- Debra Winger as FBI Agent Cathy Weaver / Katie Philips
- Tom Berenger as Gary Simmons
- John Heard as FBI Agent Mike Carnes
- Betsy Blair as Gladys Simmons
- John Mahoney as "Shorty"
- Ted Levine as Wesley "Wes" John Bond
- Jeffrey DeMunn as Bobby Flynn
- Albert Hall as FBI Agent Al Sanders
- David Clennon as Jack Carpenter
- Richard Libertini as Sam Kraus
- Timothy Hutton (cameo) as Juggler at the Fair
- Ralph Foody as Lyle
- Robert Swan as Dean
- Stephen E. Miller as Buster
- Maria Valdez as Rachel Simmons
- Brian Bosak as Joey Simmons
- Clifford A. Pellow as Reverend Russell Johnson

== Production notes ==
The opening sequence is loosely based on the 1984 murder of Denver talk radio host Alan Berg, which was carried out by white supremacist group known as The Order.

== Reception ==
=== Critical response ===
Betrayed received mostly mixed reviews. At Rotten Tomatoes, the film holds a 36% "Rotten" rating based on 14 reviews.

Sheila Benson in the Los Angeles Times in August 1988 believed Betrayed contained "a loosening of the trademark Costa-Gavras tension and the sogging of a relevant issue into overwrought pulp", which for all the efforts of the actors "the film begins at the implausible and works its way quickly downhill". It lurches "from the outrageous to the outright ludicrous".

Roger Ebert wrote: "a film that left me in turmoil, torn between the strong sympathies I felt for the characters and the fundamental doubts I had about the plot. Here were people I believed in, involved in a story that no one could believe in." Ebert thought there was a conflict between the thriller envisaged in the screenplay by Eszterhas and the presumed wish of Costa-Gavras to make a political film, but there still remains "two performances of such power that the characters become real, and sympathetic, despite everything", in reference to the central roles of Berenger and Winger. On Siskel & Ebert, Ebert recounted that one of its "racially-charged scenes was very offensive" and listed it among 1988's worst movies.

Janet Maslin in The New York Times itemized what she saw as the film's "story problems". She doubted there was a feasible way "to stage the sequence that has the amorous Gary dragging his new sweetheart along on a racist hunting expedition, insisting 'You'll like this' when she protests? Is it possible, after this, that she can still find him attractive? Is the F.B.I. really apt to send a brand-new female agent on such a dangerous mission, to deny her adequate backup and to bully her when she complains? John Heard, who is good as an F.B.I. colleague who's in love with Cathy, is meant to provide the element of sexual jealousy that explains this. But like too much of Betrayed, it just doesn't make sense."

In a 1996 interview, Berenger named Betrayed as his favorite film, shrugging off any media criticism with the retort "It was exactly what it was meant to be".

=== Box office ===
The film debuted at number 2 at the US box office, grossing $5,534,787 and coming in behind the second weekend of A Nightmare on Elm Street 4: The Dream Master. The film would go on to gross $25,816,139 in the United States and Canada.

== See also ==
- Talk Radio
- The Order
- American History X
- Green Room
- Imperium
- BlacKkKlansman
- White supremacist terrorism in the United States
