= Wotansvolk =

White nationalist neopagan movement

Wotanism
Founder
- David Lane, Ron McVan, Katja Lane

Regions with significant populations
- American Mountain States, Europe

Religions
- Heathenry (Nordic racial paganism)

Scriptures
- Temple of Wotan: Holy Book of the Aryan Tribes, Creed of Iron: Wotansvolk Wisdom, the "Fourteen Words", "88 Precepts", Hávamál

Wotansvolk (English: "Odin's Folk") promulgates a white nationalist variant of Neo-Paganism—founded in the early 1990s by Ron McVan, Katja Lane and David Lane (1938–2007) while Lane was serving a 190-year prison sentence for his actions in connection with the white supremacist revolutionary domestic terrorist organization The Order. After the founding of 14 Word Press by David Lane and his wife Katja to disseminate her husband's writings, Ron McVan joined the press in 1995 and founded Temple of Wotan (co-writing a book by that name). 14 Word Press – Wotansvolk proceeded to publish several books for the practice of Wotanism before becoming defunct in the early 2000s.

== History ==
Wotansvolk was launched following the publication by David Lane of a 1995 article titled "Wotan's Folk", which gave the group its name. Wotan is the Germanic name for Odin, a central figure in Norse faith and other Germanic mythologies. Lane had been publishing white supremacist and neopagan work under the name "14 Word Press", along with his wife Katja Lane and Ron McVan, an artist who had become involved in the white supremacist movement from the 1970s after reading the works of Ben Klassen. Headquartered at a mountain outside St. Maries, Idaho, Wotansvolk rapidly evolved into "a dynamic propaganda center that spread its message throughout the United States and abroad".

Established at a time when Internet was beginning to revolutionize communication means, the group set up a website in 1995, and got its own domain in 1997, "14words.com". In 2001, an online chat was created, in order to link Heathens around the world in a common white power culture. The first European Wotansvolk group was established in spring 1996 in London. According to Mattias Gardell, Wotansvolk was not founded as a membership organization but rather as a propaganda center, providing "a philosophical foundation for independent kindreds and fraternities" with a large number of individual supporters helping disseminate Wotansvolk materials in their local communities. Besides illustrating the group's publications, McVan extended Odinism to a business by selling artifacts such as rune-staffs, Thor's hammers or ceremonial drinking horns.

A number of pagan white-power bands have referenced Wotansvolk in their lyrics, including Darken's Creed of Iron album and Dissident's album A Cog in the Wheel. The original group eventually split in 2002, when administration of Wotansvolk was transferred to John Post in Napa, California. In March of the same year, Post announced the formation of the National Prison Kindred Alliance, as a joint effort of Wotansvolk and a number of independent Asatrú/Odinist tribal networks seeking to improve their religious rights in penitentiaries.

=== Presence in US prisons ===
Wotansvolk operated a successful prison outreach program. Research by Mattias Gardell indicated "a pagan revival among the white prison population, including the conversion of whole prison gangs to the ancestral religion [...] partly due to the reputation of Lane and its association with the legendary Brüders Schweigen, Wotansvolk's name-recognition is high among the Aryan prison population". As of January 2001, Wotansvolk catered to more than 5,000 prisoners, including several members of The Order like David Lane and Richard Scutari. There were fewer than a hundred prison kindreds by the fall of 1996; more than three hundred of them were present by the year 2000. Prison authorities however often break groups by disseminating their members to various establishments. Lane's campaigning has contributed to the fact that all states now allow any prisoner to wear a Thor's hammer as a religious medallion.

If there are many white supremacist groups active in prison, the organization seemed according to Gardell "more successful in its outreach efforts than other Asatrú/Odinist programs". Non-racist versions of Asatrú and Odinism are protected in the US under freedoms of speech and of religion, but violent and racist religious materials, such as Wotanism, may be banned or restricted from prisons. While the movement is primarily associated to prison culture in the media, Wotansvolk co-founder Katja Lane asserted in a 1999 interview that prisoners constituted only an estimated 20 percent of Wotansvolkers in the United States.

== Beliefs ==
Wotansvolk is based on a combination of white separatism, Jungian psychology, the neo-völkisch movement, Western esotericism and syncreticism from other far-right subcultures and religious movements, notably the Church of the Creator. Lane was an early proponent of the Zionist Occupation Government conspiracy theory, a belief that the U.S. government and the Western world is dominated by "traitors and Jews working towards the establishment of a New World Order". Convinced the white race was on the verge of extinction, Lane popularized the "Fourteen Words" slogan as a rallying point in the White pride movement. The group praises a mythologized version of the Viking Age, with Odinism as a religious component. Wotansvolkers also cite as influential the works of ariosophist Guido von List and philosopher Friedrich Nietzsche.

=== Race ===
Wotansvolk promotes "white racialism" derived from a white identity. They attribute various wars occurring in Northern Ireland and Yugoslavia as consequences of artificial borders imposed by the enemies of the white race to divide and conquer. Wotansvolk followers have defended Hitler and the Nazis as "prisoners" of these artificial boundaries.

Followers of the movement often selectively cite Carl Jung's theories of an "Aryan" collective subconscious, which they equate with the "race-soul" of Nazism. Wotansvolk followers specifically cite Jung's 1936 essay "Wotan".

=== White revolution ===
Desiring a "white revolution", Wotansvolk endorsed the "leaderless resistance" strategy originally developed by Louis Beam. Their own version involved the tactical separation between an open propaganda arm and a paramilitary underground. The mission of the overt part was to "counter system-sponsored propaganda", "educate the Folk", and "provide a man pool from which the covert or military arm can be [recruited]." Predicting that the openly racist propaganda arm would be "under scrutiny", Lane emphasized by 1994 the need for members to "operate within the [legal] parameters" and keep themselves "rigidly separated" from the military underground. The paramilitary wing would have to "operate in small, autonomous cells, the smaller the better, even one man alone", in order for its members to primarily target "weak points in the infrastructure" of industrialized societies with "fire, bombs, guns, terror, disruption, and destruction". Lane added that "whatever and whoever perform valuable service for the system are targets, human or otherwise", and that "special attention and merciless terror are visited upon those White men who commit race treason".

Lane considered loyalty to the United States "race treason", as he viewed the United States as actively committing genocide against white people.

While Wotansvolk followers have endorsed the white separatist project of the Northwest Territorial Imperative, they mostly dismissed the constitution of the white ethnostate proposed by Aryan Nations in April 1996 on the ground that it restricted liberties, especially the freedom of religion.

=== Anti-Christianity ===
David Lane attributed the current weakness of the "Aryan man" to Christianity, a creed "diametrically opposed to the natural order" and part of a Jewish conspiracy to rule the world. "God is not love", he said, "God the Creator made lions to eat lambs; he made hawks to eat sparrows. Compassion between species is against the law of nature. Life is struggle and the absence of struggle is death."

Despite Lane's contempt for Christianity, he described the Bible as containing secret codes hidden by pre-Christian, non-Jewish Aryan masters. Lane stated that this Bible code was carried over into the King James Version, which he believed Sir Francis Bacon had translated. Lane also taught something which he called "Pyramid Prophecy" which, according to him, said his name and birthdate were prophesied in the Bible as being connected to the coming of the Antichrist and embodying the spirits of Mars, Thor, and King David while being described as "the Man of prophecy", the "666 Man", and the "Joseph Smith of Wotanism". Ron McVan dismissed the African-Americans who "zealously emphasize the rigors of 200 years of slavery in this country" and Jews who "rant hysterically and endlessly about an alleged holocaust", while highlighting the "freethinking Aryan pagans, alchemists, and scientists [who] suffered under the Christian pogroms and Inquisition. This was a deliberate, religious slaughter of the innocents unparalleled in the Western world".

McVan argued that the main cause of the fall and degeneration of Aryan golden age was the spiritual advent of Jewish Christianity. According to him, the folk then began to gradually lose consciousness of itself as a race: "If ever there were a birth of tragedy, it was when Aryan man turned his back on the indigenous Gods of his race," McVan wrote in 1999.

=== Wotanism ===
Ron McVan developed Wotansvolk ariosophy in two books titled Creed of Iron (1997) and Temple of Wotan (2000), with the project to get the lost "folk consciousness" to re-emerge, and reconnect white people to their "roots [in] the Aryan race". Wotanism is presented by McVan as "the inner voice of the Aryan soul, which links the infinite past with the infinite future". To McVan, Wotan—a Germanic name for Odin—symbolizes "the essential soul and spirit of the Aryan folk made manifest" as an iron-willed warrior god. The name "Wotan" was also chosen instead of "Odin" because it was also used as an acronym for "will of the Aryan nations". According to James R. Lewis and Jesper A. Petersen, "there is no ontological distinction separating Aryan man and Aryan gods. They are conceived of as kin, differing in power rather than nature". McVan cultivated the "mystery of the blood", the belief that unmixed Aryan blood carries a genetic memory of the racial lineage with all its gods, demigods, and heroes of the aboriginal golden age. Given that the Aryan can reconnect to the archetypal gods of the blood, "man is able", in the words of McVan, "to awaken to a divinity which flows within him". "A race without its mythos and religion of the blood", McVan followed, "shifts aimlessly through history".

Wotanism, contrary to a self-denying Christianity, is seen by Wotansvolkers as a "natural religion", preaching "war, plunder, and sex". Lane's followers, who regard him as a folk hero, see Lane's writing, such as the "14 Words" and the "88 Precepts" manifesto, as holy scriptures and foundational texts. They primarily consider the gods through a "soft polytheistic" lens as Jungian archetypes, although Lane said one could be a deist, a pantheist, or an atheist and still be Wotansvolk. McVan and Lane have described many rituals and practices, none of which are required of practitioners. Lane often used "Odinist" and "Wotanist" as synonymous in his writings, and the Southern Poverty Law Center regards Lane's Wotanism as a form of Odinism, whereas Ron McVan labelled it "Heathen".

Universalist Asatruars—notably The Troth—along with some non-folkish Odinists, have rejected what they perceive as an attempt to appropriate the revival of the ancient native faith of northern Europe for political and racial ends. Folkish Heathens on their side, such as Stephen McNallen of the Asatru Folk Assembly, generally support Lane's Fourteen Words, although they are not generally in favor of domestic terrorism to establish a white ethnostate.

== See also ==
- Ariosophy – Esoteric philosophy
- Christian Identity – White supremacist interpretation of Christianity
- Creativity (religion) – White supremacist new religious movement
- Irminism – Esoteric philosophy
- National Socialist Kindred – Neo-Nazi and racial paganism organization
- Neopaganism – Religions shaped by historical paganism
- New religious movement – Religious community or spiritual group of modern origin
- White Separatism – Belief in the superiority of white people
- Ynglism – Branch of Rodnovery
