= PATCON =

FBI program targeting the Patriot movement

PATCON, short for Patriot Conspiracy, was an FBI program active from 1991 to 1993 targeting the Patriot movement and antigovernment organizations. Three undercover agents posed as members of the fictive Texas-based Veterans Aryan Movement (VAM) in order to infiltrate elements of three groups: Civilian Materiel Assistance, the Texas Light Infantry/Texas Reserve Militia, and the American Pistol and Rifle Association.

The pretext for PATCON was The Order, a white supremacist group active from 1983 to 1984. Undercurrents within the disjointed antigovernment movement called for proposed alliances or a restoration of The Order. FBI sources believed leadership of the Texas Light Infantry was connected to the original Order. In 1990, a TLI member and Aryan Nations figure threatened the murder of two agents at the FBI's Austin field office. The investigation in response to this threat would expand into PATCON.

Veterans Aryan Movement's supposed fundraising methods, bank heists and armored car robberies, intentionally echoed that of The Order.

Investigations focused on the theft of night-vision goggles from Fort Hood and the attempted purchase of Stinger missiles.

PATCON ceased operations three months after the Waco siege and 2 years before the Oklahoma City bombing.

The existence of PATCON was disclosed in 2007.

== See also ==
- COINTELPRO
