= Alan Berg =

American talk radio show host (1934–1984)

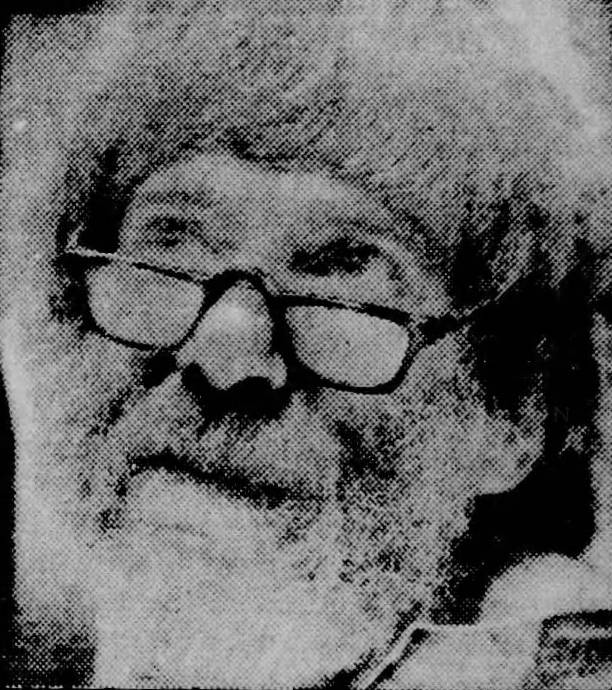
- Born: January 1934; Chicago, Illinois, U.S.
- Died: June 18, 1984 (aged 50); Denver, Colorado, U.S.
- Cause of death: Assassination by shooting
- Resting place: Waldheim Jewish Cemetery, Forest Park, Illinois
- Education: University of Denver (JD)
- Occupations: Lawyer; radio show host
- Spouses: Judith Lee Halpern (m. 1951; ann. 1951); (m. 1958; div. 1978)

Alan Harrison Berg (January 1934 – June 18, 1984) was an American talk radio show host in Denver, Colorado. He had outspoken atheistic and liberal views and a confrontational interview style.

Berg was assassinated by members of the white supremacist group The Order, which believed in killing all Jews and sending all Black people to Africa. Those involved in the killing were part of a group planning to kill those they perceived as Jews such as Berg. Two of Berg's killers, David Lane and Bruce Pierce, were convicted on charges of federal civil rights violations for killing him. They were sentenced to 190 years and 252 years in prison, respectively.

== Early life ==
Berg was a native of Chicago, Illinois. There are conflicting reports on his exact birthdate, typically being reported as January 1 or January 18, while Berg's birth record gives the date as January 9. He was the elder of two children to Joseph Berg (1897–1983), an English-born dentist, and Ruth Kanter (1909–1994), a clothing shop owner from St. Louis. The family was Jewish, but according to Berg, his father hid their faith from clients and neighbors. Berg graduated high school at 17 and married Judith Lee Berg (née Halpern) in 1951. They annulled the marriage after 30 days, but remarried in 1958. The couple had no children and divorced in 1978.

He attended the University of Colorado Denver before transferring to the University of Denver. At age 22, Berg was one of the youngest people to pass the Illinois state bar examination and he went into practice in Chicago. However, he began to experience neuromuscular seizures and had become an alcoholic. His wife convinced him to quit his practice to seek help. They moved to Denver, her hometown, and he entered rehabilitation voluntarily. Although he completed his treatment, he continued to be plagued by seizures. He was ultimately diagnosed with a brain tumor. After it was surgically removed, he made a full recovery. For the rest of his life, Berg wore long bangs to hide the surgical scars.

== Radio career ==
Berg worked at a shoe store and later opened a clothing store in Denver where he met KGMC talk show host Laurence Gross. Impressed with Berg, Gross made him a guest on several occasions. When Gross left KGMC to take a job in San Diego, California, he requested that Alan Berg be named his successor.

From KGMC, which changed its call sign to KWBZ, Berg moved to KHOW, also in Denver. After being fired from KHOW, Berg went back to KWBZ before it changed to an all-music format and he again lost his job. The unemployed Berg was courted by both KTOK in Oklahoma City, Oklahoma and a station in Detroit, Michigan. He was hired by KOA (AM) and debuted on February 23, 1981. He worked at KOA until his death.

His program could be received in more than 30 states. Berg, who held liberal social and political views, became known for upsetting some callers to the point they began sputtering, whereupon he would berate them. Clarissa Pinkola Estés of the Moderate Voice website wrote in 2007: "He didn't pick on the poor, the frail, the undefended: He chose Roderick Elliot and Frank "Bud" Farell, who wrote The Death of the White Race and Open Letter to the Gentiles, and other people from the white supremacist groups... the groups who openly espoused hatred of blacks, Jews, leftists, homosexuals, Hispanics, other minorities and religious groups".

On March 5, 1982, Berg tried to interview Ellen Kaplan, a member of the LaRouche movement, about an incident that had happened on February 7, 1982, at Newark International Airport. Kaplan had recognized Henry Kissinger, who was on his way to Boston to undergo a coronary artery bypass operation, and shouted an abusive question at him ("Is it true that you sleep with young boys at The Carlyle Hotel?"), whereupon his wife Nancy attacked Kaplan.

During his program, Berg called Kaplan on the phone. When she answered, he introduced her as "a vile human being" and praised Nancy Kissinger's attack on her. After Kaplan hung up, Berg continued to ridicule Kaplan and abuse her verbally for the remainder of the program. Afterwards, KOA received complaints from listeners and Kaplan's boyfriend, and on suggestion of the lawyers of the station owners General Electric, the station management suspended Berg from work for a few days. After returning to work, Berg toned down his methods somewhat.

== Assassination and aftermath ==
At about 9:30 p.m. on June 18, 1984, Berg returned to his Adams Street townhouse after a dinner date with Judith, with whom he was attempting reconciliation. Berg stepped out of his black Volkswagen Beetle and gunfire erupted with Berg being shot twelve times, including five shots that entered and exited his head. Berg was officially pronounced dead at the scene at 9:45 p.m. The murder weapon, a semi-automatic Ingram MAC-10, which had been illegally converted to an automatic weapon, was later traced to the home of one of The Order's members by the Federal Bureau of Investigation's Hostage Rescue Team.

A former producer of Berg's believed that he was on a "death list" both because members of his family were Jewish and because he had challenged on air the beliefs of the Christian Identity movement that Jews are descended from Satan. At the trial for his murder, prosecutors contended that he was singled out for assassination because he was a Jew and because his personality incurred the anger of white supremacists. At the conspiracy trial of members of The Order, the white supremacist organization responsible for organizing the assassination, a founding member of the group, Denver Daw Parmenter, was asked why Berg was targeted. Parmenter responded that Berg, "was mainly thought to be anti-white and he was Jewish." Berg's remains were buried at the Waldheim Jewish Cemetery in Forest Park, Illinois.

Four members of The Order, Jean Craig, David Lane, Bruce Pierce, and Richard Scutari, were indicted on federal charges for killing Berg. However, only Lane and Pierce were convicted. They were found guilty of racketeering, conspiracy, and violating Berg's civil rights. Lane was sentenced to 190 years and Pierce was sentenced to 252 years. Although Jean Craig and Richard Scutari were acquitted of killing Berg, they continued to serve 40-year and 60-year sentences, respectively, on separate federal racketeering convictions. Craig died in prison on April 18, 2001, while Scutari was released in January 2025. According to the Southern Poverty Law Center, Scutari is revered as a martyr and a "prisoner of war" by the far-right, and continued to write articles for white supremacist publications and websites from prison.

Lane was a former Klansman who later joined the neo-Nazi Christian Identity group Aryan Nation. He steadfastly denied any involvement in Berg's murder, but neither did he regret that Berg was dead. In an interview presented as part of the History Channel documentary Nazi America: A Secret History, Lane admitted to calling the show and goading Berg into an exchange and stated: "The only thing I have to say about Alan Berg is, regardless of who did it, he has not mouthed his hate-whitey propaganda from his 50,000-watt zionist pulpit for quite a few years".

Lane, incarcerated at the Federal Correctional Complex in Terre Haute, Indiana, died of an epileptic seizure at age 68 on May 28, 2007. Bruce Pierce, who was incarcerated at the Federal Correctional Complex in Union County, Pennsylvania, died of natural causes at age 56 on August 16, 2010. Craig and Scutari were convicted of unrelated crimes. The leader of The Order, Robert Jay Mathews, who was believed to have been a lookout in Berg's murder, albeit it was never proven, was burned to death during a standoff with federal authorities on December 8, 1984, at his home in Coupeville, Washington.

=== In popular culture ===
Steven Dietz's 1988 play God's Country and the 1988 film Betrayed were based on the incident, as was the 1999 film Brotherhood of Murder. Director Oliver Stone's 1988 film adaptation of Eric Bogosian's play Talk Radio also drew inspiration from Berg's death. His life and death were chronicled in the book, Talked to Death: The Life and Murder of Alan Berg by Stephen Singular. Marc Maron portrays Berg in the 2024 film The Order.

== See also ==
- List of journalists killed in the United States
- List of antisemitic incidents in the United States
