= Northwest Territorial Imperative =

White separatist ethno-state project

Flag of the Northwest Imperative idea. The flag is listed by the ADL as a hate symbol. The flag is a vertical tricolor, consisting of "Navy blue for the skies, emerald green for the trees and white for the people who live in between."

The Northwest Territorial Imperative (often shortened to the Northwest Imperative) is a white separatist idea put forward in the 1970s–1980s by white nationalist, white supremacist, white separatist, and neo-Nazi groups within the United States. According to it, members of these groups are encouraged to relocate to a region of the Northwestern United States with the intention to eventually turn the region into a white ethnostate. The formation of such a "White homeland" entails the expulsion of all non-White people from the territory. White supremacist leaders Robert E. Miles, Robert Jay Mathews and Richard Butler were originally the main promoters of the idea. In the 2000–2010s, Northwest Front's founder Harold Covington was a prominent supporter of the project.

Boundaries advanced by far-right supporters generally include the US states of Oregon, Washington, and Idaho, and sometimes also Montana, Wyoming, and Northern California. This territory partially overlaps with the bioregion proposed by the Cascadia independence movement. The two movements share similar flags; however, they have no ties to each other as the Cascadia movement is not based on racist premises.

== Name ==
The project is variously called by far-right promoters the "Northwest Imperative", "Northwest American Republic", "White American Bastion", "White Aryan Republic", "White Aryan Bastion", "White Christian Republic", or the "10% solution" (in reference a territory encompassing 10% of the contiguous United States).

== History ==
=== Background ===
The Oregon black exclusion laws of 1844, an attempt to expel all African Americans from the state, are cited as an early example of such a racist project in the region. White supremacist journalist Derek Stenzel, the Portland-based editor of Northwestern Initiative, emphasized that the 1859 constitution of Oregon explicitly stated that "no free negro, mulatto or Chinaman" could reside, vote, hold contract, or make business in the state. In his view, the Northwest Imperative project would be in line with the "high racist ideals" of the original settlers.

=== Early proposals ===
The primary proponents of a separatist white homeland in America were Richard Butler (1918–2004), the leader of the Idaho-based Aryan Nations, and Robert E. Miles (1925–1992), a white supremacist theologian from Michigan. In the early 1980s, the latter introduced the idea of a territorial separation in the Northwest in his seminar Birth of a Nation, where he urged whites to leave the American multicultural areas and "go in peace" to this region where they would remain a majority. In July 1986, the Aryan Nations Congress was organized around the theme of the "Northwest Territorial Imperative", and was attended by over 200 Ku Klux Klan and Neo-Nazi leaders, as well as 4,000–5,000 racist activists. During the Congress, Miles declared that the project could be achieved "by White nationalists moving to the area, buying land together or adjacent to each other and having families consisting of five or ten children [...] We will win the Northwest by out-breeding our opponents and keeping our children away from the insane and destructive values of the Establishment." His solution of setting aside the northwestern states (10% of the contiguous US territory) for a white nation was endorsed by the Knights of the KKK from Tuscumbia and key activists moved to the area. Different from fighting within a homeland like in the Deep South though, the imperative required a large migration of white supremacists from throughout the country, and it was generally rejected by Southern extremists. The project was also advertised by the Aryan Nations Church under the name "White Aryan Bastion".

A secondary supporter was Robert Jay Mathews (1953–1984), who lived in Metaline Falls, Washington, and advocated further colonization of the area. Fearing the extinction of the white race, he endorsed the creation of a "White American Bastion" in the Pacific Northwest. In 1983, he delivered a speech before the National Alliance, a white supremacist organization which was led by William Luther Pierce, calling the "yeoman farmers and independent truckers" to rally behind his project. Mathews received the only standing ovation at the conference.

=== Northwest Front ===
Founded by Harold Covington in November 2008, the Northwest Front seeks to bring about an independent white ethnostate in the Pacific Northwest consisting of Oregon, Washington, Idaho, and Western Montana. Covington described the proposed Northwest Territorial Imperative as "kind of like the white version of Israel", adding: "I don’t see why the Jews are the only people on Earth that get their own country and everyone else has to be diverse". Shortly after, Covington started Radio Free Northwest, an online radio show to try to convince his followers to move to the region and join the Northwest Front. Covington's strategy was that of a guerilla colonial war inspired by the Irish Republican Army to compensate for dwindling numbers and to set a concrete negotiating baseline with the United States of allowing the secession of a few states being persuaded by the cost of putting down the rebellion being too high. The organization also popularized the Vertical Blue, White, and Green Tricolor flag.

The Butler Plan was a political strategy with origins in the 1980s and formalized by Harold Covington's Northwest Front in the late 2000s. Adherents pointed out a declining white population, and small white nationalist movement as reasons to focus on a smaller land area. The Pacific Northwest was chosen because of its perceived high white population, defensible terrain, and resource nodes making it able to be economically self sufficient. It involved phases consisting of build up from initial migration to concentrate radical white populations in Idaho, Montana, Oregon, and Washington, followed by political organization and propaganda to try and convert the white population via community participation. Phase Three of the plan involved forming a "revolutionary vanguard" through the establishment of cells and units designed for resistance including guerrilla tactics modeled on historical insurgencies. He explicitly rejected "lone wolf" terrorism advocating instead for networked operations similar to the Irish Republican Army.

Harold Covington died at the age of 68 on July 14, 2018, and his death threw into question the continued existence of the Northwest Front. According to the Anti-Defamation League, "the Northwest Front has continued to be active, at least on-line, announcing in a July 2019 podcast that it was "here to stay." As of July 2026, the Northwest Front remains active and runs the "Northwest Underground" website.

== Motivation and support ==
Several reasons have been given as to why activists have chosen to turn this area into a future white homeland: it is farther removed from Black, Jewish and other minority communities than other areas of the United States are; it is geographically remote, making it harder for the federal government to uproot activists; its "wide open spaces" appeal to those who believe in the right to hunt and fish without any government regulations; it has the potential to be economically self sufficient; it has a small population, making it easier for racist migrants to "colonize" the territory; and it would also give them access to seaports and Canada. The formation of such a "White homeland" also involves the expulsion, euphemized as the "repatriation", of all non-Whites from the territory.

The idea has been endorsed by various organizations including White Aryan Resistance, Wotansvolk, the White Order of Thule, Aryan Nations and Northwestern Imperative. The defunct Oregon-based white power skinhead organization Volksfront advocated for the Imperative, and Harold Covington founded the Northwest Front to promote white migration to the region. The Northwest Territorial Imperative was the motivation for Randy Weaver and his family to move to Idaho in the early 1980s; they were later involved in the Ruby Ridge incident. The plan was also the motivation for Chevie Kehoe and Daniel Lewis Lee torturing, robbing, and murdering a family of three in Arkansas in 1997.

Neo-Nazi terrorist David Lane believed that the terrain of the Pacific Northwest was similar to Vietnam, such that a white separatist movement could successfully wage a guerilla war against the US government, comparable to the Vietnam War. Rinaldo Nazzaro, the founder of The Base, is a supporter of the Northwest Territorial Imperative.

== See also ==
- American Redoubt – a political migration movement that covers a similar geographic area
- The Base – a paramilitary group that wants to, among other goals, establish a white ethnostate in the Pacific Northwest
- The Order – a paramilitary group that engaged in domestic terrorism to establish a white territorial imperative in the Pacific Northwest
- Volkstaat – proposal for self-determination for Afrikaner/Boer minority in South Africa
- Return to the Land – a white separatist private membership organization in northern Arkansas
