= The Order (2024 film) =

Film by Justin Kurzel

- American theatrical release poster
- Directed by: Justin Kurzel
- Screenplay by: Zach Baylin
- Based on: The Silent Brotherhood by: Kevin Flynn; Gary Gerhardt
- Produced by: Bryan Haas; Stuart Ford; Justin Kurzel; Jude Law
- Starring: Jude Law; Nicholas Hoult; Tye Sheridan; Jurnee Smollett; Alison Oliver; Marc Maron
- Cinematography: Adam Arkapaw
- Edited by: Nick Fenton
- Music by: Jed Kurzel
- Production companies: AGC Studios; Chasing Epic Pictures; Riff Raff Entertainment; Arcana Studio
- Distributed by: Amazon MGM Studios (under Prime Video; Canada); Vertical (United States)
- Release dates: August 31, 2024 (Venice); December 6, 2024 (United States); December 23, 2024 (United Kingdom)
- Running time: 116 minutes
- Countries: Canada; United States; United Kingdom
- Language: English
- Box office: $2.3 million

The Order is a 2024 crime thriller film directed by Justin Kurzel and written by Zach Baylin, based on the 1989 non-fiction book The Silent Brotherhood by Kevin Flynn and Gary Gerhardt. The film revolves around FBI agent Terry Husk (Jude Law) who goes after a white supremacist terrorist group known as the Order, led by Robert Jay Mathews (Nicholas Hoult), that was active in the United States in the early 1980s. Tye Sheridan, Jurnee Smollett, Alison Oliver, and Marc Maron appear in supporting roles.

The film had its world premiere at the 81st Venice International Film Festival on August 31, 2024, where it competed for the Golden Lion. It received a limited theatrical release in the United States on December 6, 2024, and was released worldwide on the streaming platform Amazon Prime Video. It received generally positive reviews from critics.

== Plot ==
In 1983, Bruce Pierce and Gary Yarbrough lure Walter West out into the woods at night under the ruse of a hunting trip, and murder him.

Veteran FBI agent Terry Husk reopens the long-vacant field office in Coeur d'Alene, Idaho, looking for an easier caseload after working on investigations of the Ku Klux Klan and Cosa Nostra, and hoping he can persuade his estranged wife and daughter to reconnect with him. In Spokane, Washington, Bob Mathews, Pierce, Yarbrough, and David Lane rob a Washington Mutual branch.

After reviewing a case file on Aryan Nations and its founder Richard Butler, Husk introduces himself to the local sheriff's department and meets Deputy Jamie Bowen, who offers to show him to Butler's compound in Hayden Lake, Idaho. Bowen tells Husk that West, now missing for several weeks, is a member of Aryan Nations who told him the group is counterfeiting money. Bowen suspects that the group is also responsible for a recent synagogue bombing, as well as a string of robberies, including the one in Spokane. Husk meets with fellow FBI agent Joanne Carney, who tells him that a failed bomb was found in a pornography shop in Spokane around the same time as the robbery. West's wife points Husk and Bowen to where Pierce and Yarbrough took him hunting, and they discover his body in a shallow grave.

Husk and Bowen visit Butler at his compound, who tells them that he ejected Pierce and Yarbrough from Aryan Nations for using the group's printing press to counterfeit, and denies knowledge of their subsequent activities. As they leave, Husk notices a book on display in the compound's church, a copy of which was also found at the scene of West's murder. Butler identifies it as the white supremacist novel The Turner Diaries. Afterwards, Butler confronts Mathews about his splinter group's activities. While Butler seeks to work within the law and elect white supremacists to public office, Mathews aims to promote white separatism through domestic terrorism. Butler has his assistant deliver a copy of The Turner Diaries to Bowen's home with a note hinting about the group's next move.

Yarbrough bombs a pornographic theater as a distraction for Mathews to lead the robbery of an armored truck. Refusing to wait for backup, Husk attempts to stop the robbery but is outnumbered, while Bowen freezes and does not engage, angering Husk.

Bowen studies The Turner Diaries, and explains to Husk that he believes the splinter group, now calling itself the Order, is using the novel as a blueprint for overthrowing the federal government and igniting a race war. Mathews sends Pierce to Denver to assassinate Alan Berg, a Jewish talk radio host who frequently spars on-air with antisemites that call into his show. The group then holds up an armoured car on a remote California highway, getting away with millions in cash. A gun dropped at the crime scene leads police to Tony Torres, a new recruit who straw purchased guns for Mathews. Torres turns informant and leads police to a meeting with Mathews. Husk once again does not wait for backup and attempts to arrest Mathews, triggering a shootout; this time Bowen springs into action and provides covering fire. Yarbrough is apprehended, while Mathews shoots and kills Bowen as he makes his escape.

Mathews retreats with Pierce and Lane to his safe house on Whidbey Island, Washington, planning to "declare war" on the federal government and stage a major terrorist attack. Pierce and Lane try to escape and are immediately apprehended, while Mathews makes a stand, repelling the FBI as they attempt to storm the house. The FBI tactical team orders the house to be burned to force Mathews out. When Matthews fails to emerge, Husk enters alone, hoping to persuade Mathews to surrender. Husk is forced to retreat when the fire detonates a large cache of ammunition, killing Mathews.

== Cast ==
- Jude Law as Terry Husk, an FBI agent (based on Wayne Manis)
- Nicholas Hoult as Bob Mathews, leader of The Order
- Tye Sheridan as Jamie Bowen, a young police officer who assists Terry
- Jurnee Smollett as Joanne Carney, an FBI agent and friend of Terry
- Alison Oliver as Debbie Mathews, Bob's wife
- Odessa Young as Zillah Craig, Bob's lover
- Sebastian Pigott as Bruce Pierce, a perpetrator
- George Tchortov as Gary Yarbrough, a perpetrator
- Victor Slezak as Richard Butler, a prominent white supremacist minister whose power is threatened by Robert
- Phillip Forest Lewitski as David Lane, a perpetrator
- Matias Lucas as Tony Torres, (Note: Name alteration of Tom Martinez, a real member of the Order who wrote an autobiography after turning FBI informant—which itself was adapted into a 1999 television film, Brotherhood of Murder.) a perpetrator
- Bradley Stryker as Sam Stinson, a perpetrator with access to guns and ammunition
- Morgan Holmstrom as Kimmy Bowen, Jamie's wife
- Marc Maron as Alan Berg, a Jewish radio host
- Daniel Doheny as Walter West, a perpetrator who is murdered by Gary and Bruce for talking too much
- Philip Granger as Sheriff Loftlin
- Huxley Fisher as Clinton Mathews, Bob's son
- Chantal Perron as Jean Craig, a perpetrator
- Sean Tyler Foley as Tony Bentley, Richard's right-hand man
- Geena Meszaros as Bonnie Sue West, Walter's wife

== Production ==
In February 2023, it was announced that Jude Law and Nicholas Hoult would star in The Order, directed by Justin Kurzel from a screenplay by Zach Baylin based on The Silent Brotherhood, a 1989 non-fiction book by Kevin Flynn and Gary Gerhardt. Law would also produce with Kurzel, while Baylin would executive produce. Kurzel (an Australian) became particularly interested in the project after the January 6 United States Capitol attack in 2021, as the events bore a similarity to the "Day of the Rope" described as the final stage of the plan in The Turner Diaries, the Order's guiding text. Hoult was cast because Kurzel believed he could effectively portray Matthews' violent tendencies as well as the compassionate, empathetic facade that allowed him to build a following.

In May 2023, Tye Sheridan, Jurnee Smollett, Odessa Young, Alison Oliver and Marc Maron joined the cast. Maron was enthusiastic to play Alan Berg, who he saw as a trailblazer.

In preparation for filming, Kurzel wrote "manifestos" for each of the main characters, detailing their motivations and daily routines. For example, he encouraged Hoult to not smoke or drink and live as cleanly as possible to mirror Bob Matthews' known habits. As part of his own research for his role, Law contacted a number of FBI agents who had been active in the 1980s to ask them about their lives and motivations. At Kurzel's request, Law and Hoult also each spent a day surreptitiously tailing the other to get a feel for the discipline of surveillance.

Filming began in May 2023, in Alberta, Canada. Kurzel arranged for Hoult and Law to rarely interact outside of shooting to create a sense of distance between them, while encouraging Law to interact regularly off-set with Sheridan and Smollett to build a sense of camarederie appropriate for their characters.

== Release ==
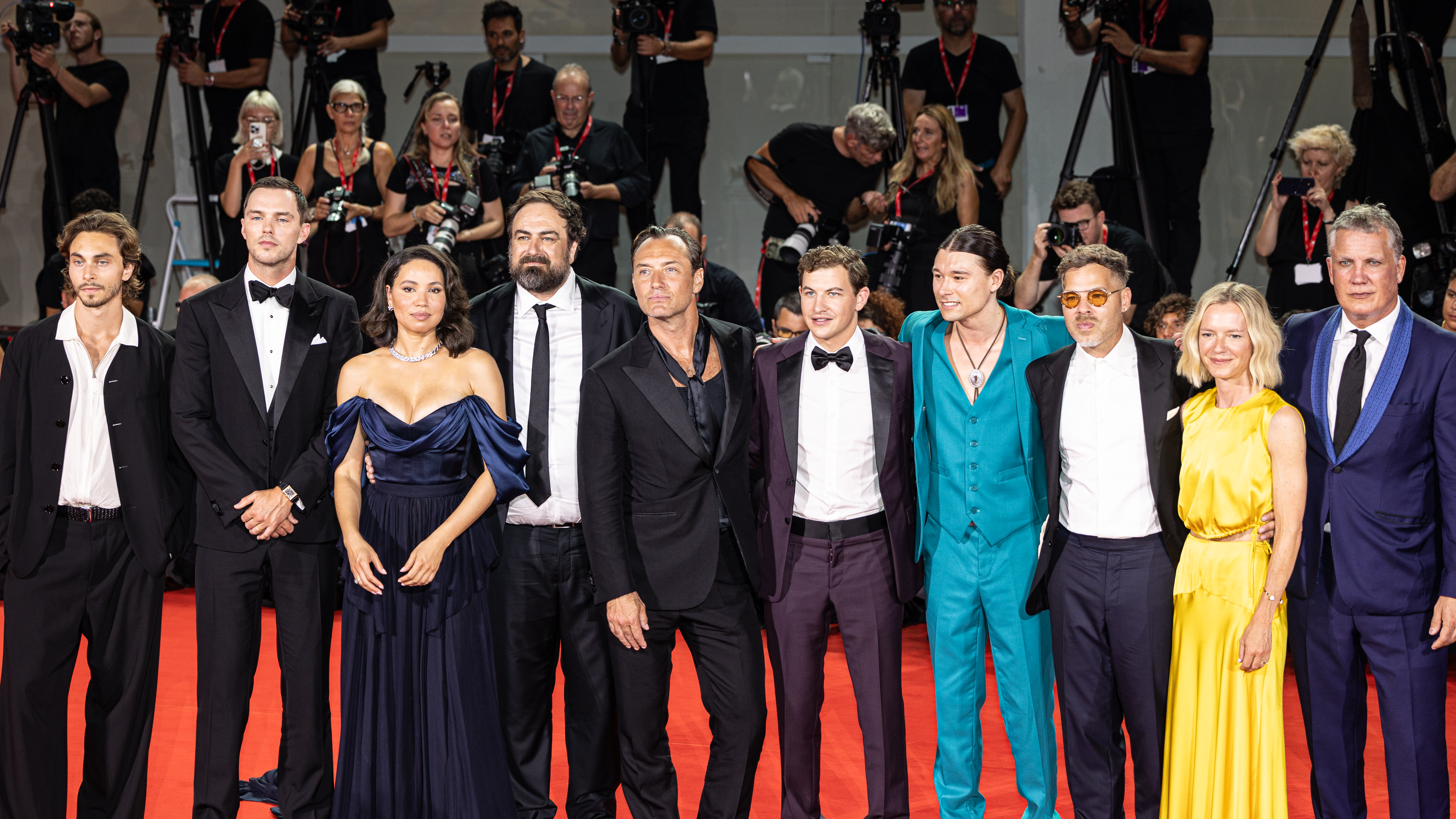
Cast and crew of the movie "The Order" at the 81st Venice International Film Festival, 2024.

The Order had its world premiere at the 81st Venice International Film Festival on August 31, 2024, where it competed for the Golden Lion.

In May 2024, Vertical acquired U.S. distribution rights to the film, and released it on December 6, 2024, in a limited theatrical release in 600–700 theaters.

Distributors were nervous about streaming the film in the US because of the political context, in the lead-up to the 2024 US elections. Amazon Prime Video acquired the rights to stream in multiple international territories excluding the United States, and it premiered on Amazon in the UK on December 27, 2024.

== Reception ==
On the review aggregator website Rotten Tomatoes, 93% of 162 critics' reviews are positive, with an average rating of 7.6/10. The website's consensus reads: "A stoic Jude Law and diabolically good Nicholas Hoult turn the tides of history in this grippingly intense thrill ride." Metacritic, which uses a weighted average, assigned the film a score of 75 out of 100, based on 37 critics, indicating "generally favorable" reviews.

Tim Grierson of Screen International wrote that the film was "always skillfully choreographed but never showy". Stephanie Bunbury of Deadline Hollywood characterized the film as a "sweeping slice of political Americana". Jordan Mintzer of The Hollywood Reporter described the film as "a gripping true story of American violence".

== See also ==
- Brotherhood of Murder
