= Federal Correctional Institution, Terre Haute =

Medium-security prison in Indiana, US

Coordinates: 39°24′44″N 87°27′12″W

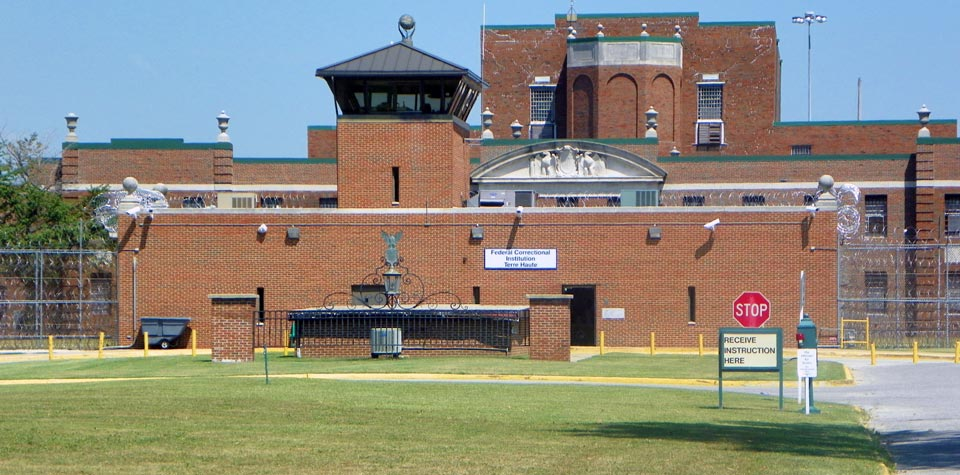
- Federal Correctional Institute, Terre Haute in May 2023
- Interactive map of Federal Correctional Institution, Terre Haute
- Location: Terre Haute, Vigo County, Indiana
- Status: Operational
- Security class: Medium-security (with minimum-security prison camp)
- Population: 1,190 (455 in prison camp)
- Opened: 1940 (as the United States Penitentiary, Terre Haute)
- Managed by: Federal Bureau of Prisons

The Federal Correctional Institution, Terre Haute (FCI Terre Haute) is a medium-security United States federal prison for male inmates in Indiana. It is part of the Federal Correctional Complex, Terre Haute (FCC Terre Haute) and is operated by the Federal Bureau of Prisons, a division of the United States Department of Justice. The facility also has an adjacent satellite prison camp for minimum-security male offenders.

FCC Terre Haute is located 2 miles (3 kilometers) south of the City of Terre Haute and 70 miles (110 kilometers) west of Indianapolis.

== Communication Management Unit ==
FCI Terre Haute has a high-security wing known as the communications management unit (CMU). According to the Bureau of Prisons, "The purpose of CMUs is to provide an inmate housing unit environment that enables staff to more effectively monitor communication between CMU inmates and persons in the community."

According to The Washington Post, the CMU population has included men convicted in high-profile post-September 11 cases, as well as defendants from the 1993 World Trade Center bombing, the 1999 "millennium" plot to bomb the Los Angeles airport, and airline hijacking cases from 1976, 1985 and 1996. Other CMUs are men who have threatened officials from behind bars, ordered murders using contraband cellphones, or engaged in other communications that officials deem threatening.

== Minimum-security prison camp ==
The minimum-security prison camp at FCI Terre Haute was built in 1960 for the purpose of housing non-violent felons to perform farm and maintenance duties. The camp has two, eight, and twelve-person rooms. Programs provided for inmates in this facility include GED, ESL, and drug education classes. Sports, cards, golf, and crafts are all different recreational activities in which the inmates may take part within the camp. A selected group of inmates at the camp take part in a community talk tour called, "Choices," where these inmates visit schools and speak to children that are already involved in meth. The Federal Bureau of Prisons National Bus Center is operated through this camp.

== Notable inmates (current and former) ==
=== Domestic terrorists ===
- American citizens who committed or attempted to commit terrorist attacks against United States citizens and interests.

Inmate Name	Register Number	Photo	Status	Details
Brandon Russell	14777-104		Released August 2021.	Terrorist organization Atomwaffen Division founder; Convicted in January 2018 in federal court of possessing an unregistered destructive device and illegally storing explosives.
Dennis Mahon	30289-424		Serving a 40-year sentence; scheduled for release in 2043.	White supremacist; convicted of conspiracy to damage buildings and property by means of explosive in 2012 for sending a mail bomb to the Office of Diversity and Dialogue in Scottsdale, Arizona in 2004, which injured two people.
John Cameron Denton	13957-579		Was serving 41 months; released from custody on December 20, 2022.	Denton called in a large amount of death and bomb threats against journalists, politicians, predominantly African-American churches and even a member of the cabinet. According to the court documents the calls by Denton impacted 134 different law enforcement agencies.
Ahmed Omar Abu Ali	70250-083		Serving a life sentence.	Convicted in 2009 of plotting to assassinate then-President George W. Bush.
John Walker Lindh	45426-083		Served a 20-year sentence; Released May 23, 2019.	Enemy combatant captured in Afghanistan; convicted of supplying services to the Taliban and carrying an explosive during the commission of a felony.
David Lane	12873-057		Died on May 28, 2007, while serving a 190-year sentence.	Member of the Neo-Nazi group The Order who was convicted of racketeering and conspiracy charges.

=== Foreign terrorists ===
- Foreign citizens who committed or attempted to commit terrorist attacks against United States citizens and interests.

Inmate Name	Register Number	Photo	Status	Details
Mohammed A. Salameh	34338-054		Serving an 86-year and 11-month sentence. Currently at USP Marion.	Palestinian terrorist, convicted perpetrator of the 1993 World Trade Center bombing.
Khalid Aldawsari	42771-177		Serving a life sentence. Now at USP Pollock	Saudi Arabian citizen and former Texas resident; convicted in 2012 of attempted use of a weapon of mass destruction for collecting bomb-making materials and researching possible targets, including the Dallas home of former president George W. Bush.
Adis Medunjanin	65114-053		Serving a 95-year sentence with an official release date of January 15, 2091.	Al-Qaeda operative; convicted in 2012 of plotting to conduct coordinated suicide bombings in the New York City subway system in September 2009; co-conspirators Najibullah Zazi and Zarein Ahmedzay pleaded guilty. Transferred to the Communications Management Unit from ADX Florence in 2021.
Oussama Kassir	05151-748		Serving a life sentence.	Originally convicted in Sweden for drug-related charges before being tried in America due to attempting to create a training camp in Oregon for al-Qaeda members to use.
Wali Khan Amin Shah	42799-054		Released from custody in September 2021.	Participant in the foiled Bojinka plot.
Hysen Sherifi	51768-056		Serving a life sentence; now at USP Coleman I	Member of the Raleigh jihad group; convicted in 2011 of terrorism conspiracy; convicted in 2013 plotting to kill six witnesses who had testified against him at his 2011 trial.
Hosam Smadi	39482-177		Scheduled release in 2031; now at USP Allenwood.	Pleaded guilty in 2010 to the attempted use of a weapon of mass destruction for plotting to destroy the 60-story Fountain Place office building in Dallas, Texas with a truck bomb in 2009.
Dritan Duka	61285-066		Serving life plus 30 years.	One of the six men that conspired to attack an Army Base in Fort Dix, New Jersey. His brothers Eljvir Duka and Shain Duka are being held USP Hazelton and ADX Florence, respectively.

=== Others ===
Inmate Name	Register Number	Photo	Status	Details
Aldrich Ames	40087-083		Deceased. Died in FCI Cumberland while serving a life sentence.	Former CIA counterintelligence operative; pleaded guilty in 1994 to espionage for passing classified information to the Soviet Union and later to Russia over a 9-year period; compromised more American spies than anyone in US history prior to Robert Hanssen.
George Ryan	16627-424		Released from custody in July 2013; served 5 years.	Governor of Illinois from 1999 to 2003; convicted in 2006 of racketeering and fraud for awarding state contracts, including a $25 million IBM computer deal, to his political allies in exchange for hundreds of thousands of dollars' worth of money and gifts.
Stewart Nozette	25004-016		Released from custody on November 13, 2020.	Planetary scientist and consultant to NASA and the US Department of Defense; pleaded guilty to attempted espionage for selling classified information to an FBI Agent posing as an Israeli Mossad operative.
James Ford Seale	09193-043		Died in custody in 2011 while serving a life sentence.	Former Ku Klux Klan member; convicted in 2007 of conspiracy and kidnapping charges for his role in the 1964 abduction and murder of two 19-year-old African-Americans, Henry Dee and Charles Moore.
Mufid Abdulqader	32590-177		Released from custody in December 2024 to a halfway house.	Former Chief Fundraiser for the Holy Land Foundation, once the largest Islamic charity in the US; convicted in 2008 of providing material support for terrorism for funneling money to the terrorist organization Hamas. Four co-conspirators were also sentenced to prison.
Brian Patrick Regan	41051-083		Serving a life sentence.	Convicted of trying to sell classified information to foreign governments.
Oscar Lopez Rivera	87651-024		Released from custody in May 2017 after President Barack Obama commuted his 70-year sentence.	Leader of the Fuerzas Armadas de Liberación Nacional Puertorriqueña (FALN), a Puerto Rican militant group which carried out bombings in Chicago, Washington, DC, Newark, and Miami between 1974 and 1980.
Russell Wasendorf	12191-029		Serving a 50-year sentence; scheduled for release in 2054. Currently at FCI Jesup.	Peregrine Financial Group founder; pleaded guilty in 2012 to mail fraud, embezzlement and making false statements for stealing over $100 million from the clients over a 20-year period and falsifying documents to cover up the fraud.
Ronald Isley	31215-112		Released April 13, 2010; served a 3-year sentence	Lead singer and founder of The Isley Brothers convicted in 2006 for tax evasion.
Shaun Bridges	20436-111		Released from custody on October 19, 2021.	Former Secret Service Agent arrested for money laundering and obstruction of justice in relation to the Silk Road investigation. Later rearrested for another bitcoin heist and had two years added to his sentencing.
Matthew F. Hale	15177-424		Scheduled release in 2036; now at USP Marion.	Soliciting an undercover FBI informant to kill Judge Joan Lefkow. Initially held at USP Florence ADMAX, Hale was transferred to FCI Terre Haute in 2016 but by late 2017 he was back in USP Florence ADMAX. In July 2020, Hale was transferred to USP Marion in Illinois.
Rajinder Sachdeva	47889-424		Released from custody on January 8, 2020.	Receiving nearly $300,000 in kickbacks from IT contractors while working as a department manager at Pace.
Abduwali Muse	70636-054		Serving a 33-year sentence; scheduled for release in 2038.	Somali pirate leader; pleaded guilty to hijacking in 2010 for leading a group who seized the Merchant Vessel Maersk Alabama and took the captain hostage in 2009; US Navy SEALs killed the three other pirates involved in the hijacking and rescued the captain. Transferred back to the CMU in Terre Haute after spending time at FCI Edgefield.
Walter Bond	37096-013		Released April 2021.	Sentenced to serve 60 months (five years) in federal prison for use of fire to destroy Sheepskin Factory in 2011. After the fire, Bond posted a message on the Internet taking responsibility for the Sheepskin Factory fire. At the end of that message he used the nickname “ALF Lone Wolf.” In 2011 he was sentenced to another 87 months for additional attacks to be served consecutively.
Howard Marks	41526-004		Served a 7-year sentence; released in 1995	Marks was convicted of drug smuggling in 1990.

== In popular culture ==
FCI Terre Haute was referenced in the film The Blues Brothers by Matt "Guitar" Murphy, who said that the prison served cabbage rolls for dinner.

The song "1st Day Out the Feds" by rapper Gucci Mane is a reference to Terre Haute Federal Correctional Institution, where he served out most of a 3-year 3-month sentence for firearm possession. His radically altered appearance, mannerisms, and demeanor upon exiting the prison in May 2016 led many to speculate that he was subjected to an experimental government program at Terre Haute and possibly even cloned by the Central Intelligence Agency. A spokesperson for the CIA dismissed these theories as mere internet rumors and refused to comment on them.

== See also ==
- List of U.S. federal prisons
- Federal Bureau of Prisons
- Incarceration in the United States
