= The Order (white supremacist group) =

American white supremacist terrorist group

- Motto: "Thou art my battle axe and weapons of war: for with thee will I break in pieces the nations, and with thee will I destroy kingdoms" (Jeremiah 51:20, KJV)
- Formation: September 1983; 43 years ago
- Dissolved: December 1984; 41 years ago
- Type: Paramilitary, White supremacist, neo-Nazi
- Purpose: Foment a white supremacist revolution against the "Zionist Occupation Government", establish an all-white homeland in the Pacific Northwest
- Location: United States
- Key people: Robert Jay Mathews (leader); David Eden Lane
- Affiliations: Aryan Nations

The Order, also known as the Silent Brotherhood, was a neo-Nazi organization active in the United States between September 1983 and December 1984. The group raised funds via armed robbery. Ten members were tried and convicted for racketeering, and two members were tried and convicted for their role in the 1984 murder of radio talk show host Alan Berg.

Inspired by The Turner Diaries, the organization declared war on the federal government of the United States under Ronald Reagan, which it called the "Zionist occupied government". The Order drew up a hit list of enemies, and on June 18, 1984, radio talk show host Alan Berg was murdered in front of his home by Bruce Pierce, assisted by other members of the Order. Berg was number two on the Order's list.

In December 1984, authorities were able to track down Robert Jay Mathews, the organization's leader, to a house on Whidbey Island in Washington State, where he refused to surrender. Mathews was suspected of wounding an FBI agent in a previous shooting in Oregon. During a shootout, the house was ignited by incendiary flares and became engulfed in flames, with Mathews being killed.

== History ==
The Order was founded by Robert Jay Mathews in late September 1983 at his farm near Metaline, Washington. Reportedly, Mathews's farm was where the members trained. Mathews had previously formed the Sons of Liberty, an anti-communist militia mostly made up of Mormon survivalists, fundamentalists and associates of John Singer that had no connection to the historical American organization of the same name.

A fundamental goal of the Order was revolution against the American government, which its members, and those of other white supremacist groups, believed to be controlled by a cabal of Jews with internationalist and Jewish-racial loyalties, rather than loyalty to the American nation. The Order was named after, and partly modeled on, a fictional terrorist group in William Luther Pierce's novel The Turner Diaries. The Order's goals included the establishment of a homeland (now the Northwest Territorial Imperative) from which Jews and non-whites would be barred. They often referred to the United States federal government as ZOG, an acronym for Zionist occupied government. Members of the Order included Randy Evans, Gary Yarborough, Bruce Pierce, Denver Parmenter, Frank DeSilva (also known as Frank Silva), Richard Scutari, David Lane, Randy Duey, and David Tate.

=== Funding ===
Next, the group discussed how to fund actions of the Order, considering bidding on lumber-jacking and timber contracts, counterfeiting money, diaspora funding from overseas oil countries, and robberies. Though timber contracts were legal, counterfeiting money appealed to the ideals of the group in that it undermined the government by devaluing US currency. Robbery was first denied as an option due to its perceived sinful nature, until someone suggested they could rob pimps and drug dealers, which would raise money for the organization as well as set back street criminals in their businesses.

The organization won a bid on a timber trimming contract for a trail in the Salmo-Priest Wilderness. After five hours of grueling work, Mathews decided to call off the work and head home. Headed back to the trucks, David Lane muttered, "Well, we're going to have to be better thinkers than our fathers were, because we're sure not the men they were," while Mathews mentions that the pay off from the job "would not fund the right wing for a week anyway." The Order decided to try their hand at robberies, attempting to target pimps and drug dealers. After weeks of trailing black men in flashy cars, they realized they had no idea what a pimp or drug dealer looked like, and decided to switch to other crimes for funding.

The Order raised money through robbery. This began with the robbery of a pornographic video store, which netted them $369.10. Their later robberies were more effective, including a bank robbery, followed by a series of three armored car robberies. In the armored car robberies, they took a total of $4.1 million, including their final armored car robbery near Ukiah, California that netted them $3.8 million. The Order detonated a timed firebomb in a movie theater in Seattle (causing no deaths or injuries), in order to occupy the police during their second planned armored car robbery that took place the next day. They also detonated a bomb at the only synagogue in Boise, Idaho. Proceeds from these robberies were distributed to leaders of sympathetic organizations such as William Pierce (National Alliance) and Frazier Glenn Miller, Jr. (White Patriot Party).

The Order also ran a counterfeiting operation, but their bills were of poor quality, especially early on, and they led to Bruce Pierce being jailed early on, which later precipitated the group's downfall.

=== Downfall ===
The Order was ultimately brought down when a member, Tom Martinez, approached the FBI and offered to turn informant. His role in the organisation had been to pass counterfeit money and he had been arrested on June 29, 1984, for passing counterfeit ten dollar bills to buy liquor. After he was released on his own recognizance Mathews convinced him to go underground and during this period Martinez learned that Mathews intended to kill the liquor store owner in order to prevent him from testifying. When he learned of Mathews's plan, Martinez approached the FBI and offered to turn informant.

On December 8, 1984, Mathews was cornered in a rented waterfront house off Smugglers Cove Rd near Greenbank, Washington on Whidbey Island. After a two-hour shoot-out, involving the use of machine-guns, tear gas and a helicopter to illuminate the target with flares, Mathews's house was engulfed by flames and, according to FBI officials, exploded in "a huge fireball". Mathews had been wanted for the shooting of an FBI agent in Oregon two weeks before.

=== Convictions ===
Ten members of the Order were tried and convicted under Racketeer Influenced and Corrupt Organizations Act (RICO) statutes with the help of the testimony of Frazier Glenn Miller, Jr., who testified against Order members in order to have his own sentence reduced. In a separate trial, three other members of the Order were tried and convicted of violating the civil rights of Alan Berg. No one has been charged in the murder of Berg. David Lane, the getaway driver for Berg's assailants, was sentenced to 190 consecutive years on the charges of racketeering, conspiracy, and violating Berg's civil rights. He died in prison in 2007. Order member Bruce Pierce was sentenced to 252 years in prison for his involvement in the Berg murder, and died of natural causes at the Allenwood Federal Correctional Complex on August 16, 2010 at the age of 56. Like Mathews, Lane and Pierce are regarded by many white-supremacists as heroes, political prisoners, and martyrs. In another trial, 14 men were charged with sedition, conspiracy, and civil rights violations. Thirteen of them were acquitted, and the judge dismissed the charges against the fourteenth man for lack of evidence.

A 2011 NPR report claimed that some of the people associated with this group were imprisoned in a highly restrictive communication management unit. Richard Scutari, a member of the Order, was sentenced to a 60-year prison term in 1986, and was transferred to USP Marion CMU in July 2008.

== Members ==
Name	Associated Group(s)	Sentence	Status	Ref.
David Charles Tate	Church of Israel and Aryan Nations	Life imprisonment without parole	Incarcerated at Southeast Correctional Center	
Richard Joseph Scutari	The Covenant, the Sword, and the Arm of the Lord	60 years	Incarcerated at FCI Mendota Released January 21, 2025	
Thomas Allen Martinez	National Alliance	3 years probation		
Andrew Virgil Barnhill	The Covenant, the Sword, and the Arm of the Lord	40 years	Released on April 24, 2008	
Ardie McBrearty	Posse Comitatus	40 years	Released on July 3, 1995	
David Eden Lane	Aryan Nations	190 years	Died while incarcerated at FCI Terre Haute on May 28, 2007	
Bruce Carroll Pierce	Aryan Nations	252 years	Died while incarcerated at USP Allenwood on August 16, 2010	
Sharon Merki	LaPorte Church of Christ	25 years		
Jean Margaret Craig		40 years	Died in prison on April 18, 2001	
Denver Daw Parmenter II	Church of Jesus Christ–Christian	20 years		
Randolph George Duey	Aryan Nations	100 years	Incarcerated at FCI Butner Medium	
Frank Lee Silva	Ku Klux Klan	40 years	Released on August 18, 1998	
Gary Lee Yarbrough	Aryan Nations	60 years	Died while incarcerated at ADX Florence in 2018	
Zillah Craig				
Jackie Lee Norton	The Covenant, the Sword, and the Arm of the Lord	6 months plus 5 years probation		
James Sherman Dye		20 years		
Robert E. Merki	LaPorte Church of Christ	30 years		

== The Order II (Bruder Schweigen Strike Force II) ==
The Order II, which is also known as the Bruder Schweigen Strike Force II, was an attempt to perpetuate the activities of the first Order by David and Deborah Dorr, both of whom were previously members of Aryan Nations, but their activities were confined to the state of Idaho. The group launched its first attack on March 6, 1986, when it sent a packaged bomb to Gary Solomon, a local Jewish businessman who owned the Solomon Trucking company in Hayden Lake, Idaho. No casualties resulted from the incident and it is unknown whether or not the explosion caused any property damage. The bomb was sent by David Dorr, the leader of Order II, a group that grew out of the original Order, which had previously collapsed. Order II (Bruder Schweigen Strike Force II) was also anti-government and antisemitic.

On August 7 of the same year, a 12-inch tube bomb exploded at Fred Bower's auto repair shop in Hayden, Idaho, causing about $2,000 in damage. No casualties resulted from the incident. The two perpetrators, David and Deborah Dorr, and an alleged third perpetrator, Edward W. Hawley, were members of the Bruder Schweigen Strike Force II.

On September 16, 1986, an explosion was reported in front of the house of a Catholic priest who lived in the city of Coeur d'Alene, in Idaho. The explosion caused no injuries. It only caused property damage. On September 29, 1986, his latest attack targeted a federal building, a telephone and luggage store, and a restaurant parking lot in Coeur d'Alene, without causing any injuries.

The ATF and local, state and federal security forces collected evidence from the scene of the blast and executed a federal search warrant at Dorr's residence three days later. Special agents discovered a shelter that housed AR-15s converted to select-fire assault rifles in violation of federal firearms laws. Thirty other firearms, large amounts of ammunition, and counterfeit money were also found. They also discovered bomb-making components that were used in the September 29 explosion, as well as in previous bombings. The militants received federal sentences which ranged from 6 to 30 years and state sentences which ranged from 5 years to life in prison.

== In popular culture ==
Several projects premiered during 1988, which drew inspiration from—albeit seldom direct depictions of—the events that unfolded during The Order's brief reign: The Oliver Stone-directed film Talk Radio, starring Eric Bogosian (who adapted his own play) as a fictional radio DJ similar to Alan Berg, drew inspiration from his assassination. That same year, the film Betrayed—directed by Costa-Gavras and starring Debra Winger as an undercover FBI agent, tasked with infiltrating Tom Berenger's clandestine "family"—also drew inspiration from The Order and its activities. In addition, a play from playwright Steven Dietz titled God's Country documented the real-life events in a triptych, utilizing several key individuals as characters. It premiered at Seattle's ACT Theatre on August 18, 1988.

In 1989, the non-fiction book The Silent Brotherhood, written by investigative journalists Kevin Flynn and Gary Gerhardt, was published detailing The Order's history of events.

A 1999 television film called Brotherhood of Murder, based upon the autobiography written by group member-turned-FBI informant Tom Martinez (along with co-writer John Guinther), aired on Showtime. It starred William Baldwin as Martinez; Kelly Lynch as his wife, Susan; and Peter Gallagher as The Order's leader Robert Jay Mathews.

The crime drama-thriller film The Order, loosely based on the aforementioned Flynn & Gerhardt book The Silent Brotherhood, was released in 2024. The film was directed by Justin Kurzel, with a screenplay written by Zach Baylin.

== See also ==
- Aryan Nations
- Aryan Republican Army
- Atomwaffen Division, another far-right American neo-Nazi terrorist militia group
- The Base (hate group)
- Elohim City, Oklahoma
- Far-right politics § United States
- Far-right subcultures
- Fascism in North America § United States
- Fascism in the United States
- Fort Smith sedition trial
- Nazism in the Americas
- Phineas Priesthood, a radical ideological faction of the far-right Christian Identity movement which was also founded in the Pacific Northwest
- Radical right (United States)
- Right-wing terrorism § United States

== Further reading and listening ==
- Dees, Morris. Gathering Storm: America's Militia Threat. Harper Perennial, 1997. ISBN 0-06-092789-5
- Flynn, Kevin J.; Gerhardt, Gary (1990). The Silent Brotherhood: Inside America's Racist Underground (Reprint ed.). New York: Signet Books. ISBN 9780451167866.
- Söderman, Magnus; Holappa, Henrik. Unbroken Warrior: The Richard Scutari Letters. Nationellt Motstånd Förlag, 2011. ISBN 978-91-85737-04-8
- Josh Mattison. "The Order of Death". Apple Podcasts Preview (Podcast). Apple Inc.
