= Brotherhood of Murder =

1999 American crime drama television film

- Poster
- Genre: Crime drama
- Based on: Brotherhood of Murder by: Thomas Martinez; John Guinther
- Teleplay by: Robert J. Avrech
- Directed by: Martin Bell
- Starring: William Baldwin; Peter Gallagher; Kelly Lynch
- Music by: Laura Karpman
- Country of origin: United States
- Original language: English

Production
- Executive producers: Nelson I. Korchak; Thomas DeWolfe
- Production location: Vancouver
- Cinematography: James Bagdonas
- Editor: Nancy Baker
- Running time: 90 minutes
- Production company: Showtime Networks

Original release
- Network: Showtime
- Release: December 12, 1999

Brotherhood of Murder is a 1999 American crime drama television film directed by Martin Bell and written by Robert J. Avrech, based on the 1988 autobiography by Tom Martinez and John Guinther. The film stars William Baldwin, Peter Gallagher, and Kelly Lynch, and tells the true story of the white supremacist group The Order, its founder Robert Jay Mathews, and the largest cash robbery in US history. It centers around group member-turned-FBI-informant Martinez and his involvement in the group. It aired on Showtime on December 12, 1999.

== Synopsis ==
Following his military discharge, Tom Martinez returns home to Philadelphia and learns his wife Susan is pregnant. He struggles to find work to support his family. After losing a job at a bakery, he begins working as a janitor where he is taunted by some black kids. He meets Walter West in a bar, who invites Tom to a meeting of The Order. There, he is introduced to Bob Mathews, leader of the white supremacist group.

The Order funds its activities by robbing video stores and armored cars. But their real source of income turns out to be counterfeiting. After Walter is killed as a traitor, Tom is apprehended by the FBI and used as an informant and witness in their case against The Order.

== Cast ==
- William Baldwin as Tom Martinez
- Peter Gallagher as Bob Mathews
- Kelly Lynch as Susan Martinez
- Stephen E. Miller as Walter West

== Background ==
The film is based on the book Brotherhood of Murder by Tom Martinez and John Guinther about Martinez's recruitment into The Order, and subsequent involvement in the group. The book was published by McGraw-Hill in 1988. The film is only a loose adaptation of the book. Filming took place in Vancouver.

== Reception ==
Reviewer Mark Dawidziak for The Plain Dealer was critical, saying that despite lofty aims it "misfires –badly", despite some memorable elements, lacking depth and a critical exploration of such dark topics. Writing for Variety, Laura Fries described Baldwin's portrayal of Tom Martinez as "sympathetic instead of believable", Lynch's performance as "listless", Laura Karpman's music as "uneven", and Nancy Baker's editing as "entirely random". Fries described the passage of time in the film as "inexplicable".

Several reviewers praised Gallagher's performance as Mathews. Speaking of Baldwin's performance, Fries was more mixed than negative, writing that: "It would have been interesting to see what Baldwin could have done in the role of Bob, using his wry smile and natural charisma to win over new converts. Instead it’s Gallagher doing his interpretation of an evil Mr. Rogers."

== See also ==
- The Order (2024 film)
