= David Lane (white supremacist) =

American neo-Nazi (1938–2007)

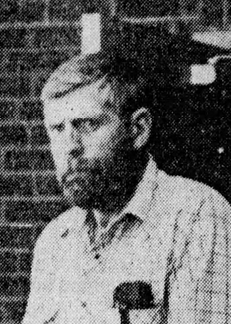
- Lane after his 1985 arrest
- Born: Vernon David Eden; November 2, 1938; Woden, Iowa, U.S.
- Died: May 28, 2007 (aged 68); FCI Terre Haute, Terre Haute, Indiana, U.S.
- Other name: Wodensson
- Organization(s): Ku Klux Klan, Aryan Nations, The Order, Wotansvolk
- Known for: Fourteen Words, murder of Alan Berg
- Spouses: Katja Maddox (m. 1994)
- Criminal information
- Convictions: Violation of civil rights; Racketeering; Conspiracy to engage in racketeering
- Penalty: De facto life imprisonment (190 years in prison) (Note: Served consecutively: 150-year federal prison term (violation of civil rights); 20-year federal prison term (racketeering); 20-year federal prison term (conspiracy))

Details
- Victims: Alan Berg, 50

David Eden Lane (born Vernon David Eden; November 2, 1938 – May 28, 2007) was an American neo-Nazi and a co-founder of the white supremacist organization The Order. A previous member of a number of white supremacist groups, including the Ku Klux Klan, the White American Political Association, and Aryan Nations, Lane helped found the Order after meeting its founder, Robert Jay Mathews, in 1983. The Order committed several murders, robberies, and other crimes.

As part of the Order, Lane engaged in widespread counterfeiting of money and helped orchestrate the assassination of Alan Berg, a Jewish Denver-based radio talk show host; he had previously argued with Berg on his radio show. For his actions as part of The Order, Lane was convicted and sentenced to 190 years in prison for racketeering, conspiracy, and the violation of the civil rights of Alan Berg, who prosecutors claimed was murdered by a member of the group via a drive-by shooting with Lane acting as driver. Lane died while incarcerated at the FCI Terre Haute in Terre Haute, Indiana.

While in prison, Lane wrote many white supremacist materials and coined the "Fourteen Words", a well known white supremacist slogan. Initially an adherent of Christian Identity, he later rejected Christianity and formulated a white supremacist pagan faith called Wotansvolk. He has been described by the Southern Poverty Law Center as "one of the most important ideologues of contemporary white supremacy".

== Early life ==
David Lane was born Vernon David Eden on November 2, 1938 in Woden, Iowa. The town was then largely populated by German immigrants. He was born to Geerd and Evelyn Eden (née Johnson). His father was 30 years old, while his mother was 15. Lane was the third of four siblings, with a brother and two sisters.

His father, Geerd, was an alcoholic itinerant worker who was physically abusive toward his wife and children. Lane described him as "a truly despicable creature" and said he would prostitute his wife for money for alcohol. His father once beat Lane's older brother so severely that he was rendered deaf. In 1942, when Lane was four years old, his father abandoned the family, and the siblings were placed for adoption. His biological father then served in World War II and received the Purple Heart after being wounded fighting in Germany. Geerd died in 1955; according to Lane, Geerd was killed by his next wife's brother after he abused her.

After being placed in state care he was separated from and lost contact with his biological family; he and all of his siblings were adopted to different families and given new names. He was adopted in 1943 by a traveling Lutheran minister, surnamed Lane. He disliked his adoptive father and considered him a "buffoon". His adoptive family was strictly Christian, which contributed to Lane's distaste for Christianity. Lane claimed that he first became attracted to women of the "Caucasian race" after befriending a blonde-haired girl in first grade.

He traveled across the Midwestern United States with his adoptive family, moving frequently, before finally settled in Aurora, Colorado. He attended Aurora High School. Shortly after graduating, he married to Mary Lou and attended community college in Denver, but left after only one semester.

== White supremacy ==
Lane (right) at an Aryan Nations meeting in 1981 with Richard Girnt Butler, the leader of the Aryan Nations

Originally aspiring to become a golf professional, Lane worked as a real estate broker starting in 1973. He became increasingly involved in white supremacist politics, and as a result his real estate license was revoked because he "wouldn't sell homes to coloreds in white neighborhoods", which he freely admitted. Lane was briefly a member of the John Birch Society before joining the Ku Klux Klan, becoming the organizer of the Denver unit of the Knights of the Ku Klux Klan in 1979.

In 1977, his other three biological siblings managed to reunite after not seeing each other for 35 years. They were unable to find Lane; his sister said to the news at the time that he seemed to have "evaporated". The reunion received a large amount of national press coverage, which the siblings allowed in the hopes that it would lead to them finding Lane and potentially their mother. In 1979, his biological sister Jane tracked him down, and Lane regained contact with his biological family for the first time in several decades. As an adult he added the "Eden" back into his name. He became close again with his brother. His other sister did not share his views, but Jane also became a white supremacist and was married to the leader of the Pennsylvania branch of Aryan Nations, Carl Franklin. This contact with Jane and her husband led to Lane making contact with Aryan Nations. In late 1981, Lane became Colorado State Organizer of Aryan Nations.

In 1981, Lane distributed a pamphlet he had authored, "The Death of the White Race", in the Denver area, leading to publicity and attention from the Anti-Defamation League (ADL). He afterwards claimed that the Denver police attempted to assassinate him by order of the ADL. The resulting publicity made it difficult for Lane to hold a job and led to his wife leaving him. The next year, he left Denver for the Aryan Nations compound in Hayden Lake, Iowa, working as their "propaganda minister".

By 1983, he had returned to Denver, where he led the Colorado chapter of the white supremacist White American Political Association group, led by Tom Metzger. He worked selling ads for a Colorado-based far-right paper, The Primrose and Cattleman's Gazette, and also made money hustling golf games. That year, he called in to the talk show of local Jewish Denver radio host Alan Berg. In a heated interview, Lane discussed his views with Berg. As a result of the interview, his advertisements were boycotted, and he lost his advertising job; facing issues finding a job, he moved back to Idaho.

== The Order ==
In 1983, Lane met Robert Jay Mathews, a fellow white supremacist. At the Aryan Nations world congress in July 1983, they met again; Mathews was then developing a plan to launch a clandestine white supremacist organization. On September 22, 1983, Lane was among the nine founding members to be sworn into The Order, a white supremacist group led by Mathews whose mission was to "deliver our people from the Jew and bring total victory to the Aryan race". Within the Order, Lane was known for being a solitary figure, leading to him being nicknamed the "Lone Wolf" by other members of the group.

The Order went on a large crime spree; they were accused of stealing over $4.1 million during armored car hijackings, killing four people, detonating bombs, counterfeiting money, organizing militaristic training camps and carrying out numerous other crimes with the ultimate goal of overthrowing the "Zionist Occupation Government" they deemed in control of the United States and to "liberate the Pacific Northwest as a homeland for whites" in the process. In early 1984 Lane and several other members of the Order printed $500,000 in counterfeit money.

The Order had several figures they intended to assassinate, including cultural and political figures. At Lane's insistence, however, they selected as their target Alan Berg, the radio host with whom Lane had previously argued, as a result of his on air argument with Lane. On June 18, 1984, a group of Order members followed Berg home. Berg was shot and killed in the driveway of his Denver home by three members of The Order; Bruce Pierce shot him, and Lane was said to be the getaway driver.

Lane was an initial suspect from the media in the Berg murder due to the past argument and his involvement in white supremacy; Lane denied any involvement, and in July wrote an open letter to the news denying he was involved in the murder. Several days after the Berg murder, Lane and Thomas Martinez travelled to Philadelphia to distribute the counterfeit money; Martinez ignored Lane's instruction to distribute the money in New Jersey, and was arrested. As a result, Martinez became an FBI informant and played a large part in taking down the Order. The organization became the focus of an intensive FBI investigation; in a final confrontation in December, Mathews burned to death after a confrontation with the FBI.

After Mathews's death, the FBI connected Lane to the Order's counterfeiting scheme. Another member of the Order, Ken Loff, started informing for the FBI and gave them information that led to Lane. Lane was arrested on the evening of March 31, 1985, in Winston-Salem, North Carolina.

== Legal proceedings and imprisonment ==
In 1985, for his role in The Order's crimes, Lane was sentenced in a federal court in Seattle alongside other members of the Order for racketeering and conspiracy. He received a 40 year sentence. On April 24, 1987, he was indicted alongside 10 other defendants for seditious conspiracy for plotting to overthrow the government in Fort Smith, Arkansas. The same day, new indictments were brought in Denver for his role in Alan Berg's death; he was a defendant alongside Pierce, Richard Scutari, and Jean Craig. In November, Lane and Pierce were both convicted for their role in the murders, and received 150 year sentences. Scutari and Craig were acquitted. While he did not pull the trigger, prosecutors said Lane drove the getaway car and played a large role in the planning of Berg's assassination. Lane was sentenced to consecutive sentences totaling 190 years, including 20 years for racketeering, 20 years for conspiracy, both under the Racketeer Influenced and Corrupt Organizations Act (RICO), and 150 years for violating the civil rights of Berg. During the legal proceedings, his brother died, which Lane blamed on federal agents.

In the Fort Smith sedition trial, Lane and fourteen others were put on trial for allegedly conspiring to overthrow the American government. During the trial, Lane spoke of his views in his closing arguments, claiming that the government's goal was white genocide and that the Order had been acting in resistance to tyranny. Lane, and all fourteen others, were found not guilty.

Lane was originally placed in FCI Terre Haute, a medium-security prison. He was transferred to the maximum security prison United States Penitentiary, Marion after his sentencing in 1986, before being transferred to Federal Correctional Institution, Leavenworth in 1991 and finally moved to ADX Florence in Florence, Colorado in 1994. While incarcerated, he had the Federal Bureau of Prisons ID # 12873–057.

While imprisoned, Lane began studying philosophy and history, particularly mystery religions. He wrote a number of tracts that began to circulate within the white supremacist movement, and contributed to white supremacist periodicals from inside prison. He rejected Christian Identity and moved to Odinism in this period. He wrote books and articles about gematria and the demographic and sociopolitical status of the white race for white nationalist periodicals and websites.

In 1994, Katja Maddox, a recently divorced woman who Lane had known prior to his imprisonment, began writing Lane from prison. They married in October 1994. Katja was also a longtime white supremacist activist and had spent decades in the white supremacist movement. Lane and Katja established a publishing company called 14 Word Press in Idaho to disseminate his writings; soon after, Lane's friend Ron McVan, also an Odinist, joined to assist them. They operated a newsletter, Focus Fourteen, and in 1995 the trio founded Wotansvolk, an Odinist faith. In 1999, many of his writings were compiled into a book, Deceived, Damned, and Defiant: The Revolutionary Writings of David Lane. Katja divorced him in the early 2000s; Lane and Katja remained on good terms.

He was featured in Nazi Pop Twins, a documentary aired on July 19, 2007, on Channel 4 in the UK. In it, he was shown speaking by phone with Prussian Blue (the music act from the documentary) and termed them "fantasy sweethearts" and that he viewed them like daughters.

Lane's earliest possible release date from prison would have been on March 29, 2035 (at age 96). He died on May 28, 2007, in FCI Terre Haute due to an epileptic seizure. On June 30, 2007, white supremacists held memorial demonstrations for Lane in cities across the United States, the United Kingdom, Germany, Russia, and Ukraine.

== Beliefs ==
Lane was described by the Southern Poverty Law Center as "one of the most important ideologues of contemporary white supremacy". According to scholar George Michael, Lane "cast his struggle in apocalyptic and Manichean terms. The embattled white race is locked in an existential struggle against the forces of evil orchestrated by the Jews." Michael argued that Lane's ideology and shifts demonstrated the "porous membrane among the various extreme Right religious orientations"; he said that the popularity of his writings among white supremacists internationally "demonstrates how the Internet can enable a seemingly obscure figure to attain international stature, albeit in a marginalised subculture".

He was originally an adherent to Christian Identity, a white supremacist interpretation of Christianity, but later rejected this in favor of Odinism. Lane claims that he rejected Christianity early in life, finding the faith boring. He accused Christianity of being a Jewish plot against the white race. Lane later favored pagan beliefs as a more authentic ancestral "white" religion, as opposed to what he viewed as Jewish-influenced Christianity. However, he believed that both Odinism and Christian Identity could be reconciled in that they were both based in ancient "mystery schools". He advocated polygamy among white people.

Lane rejected nationalism, considering it as divisive, and advocated a pan-white identity. In defining white, Lane rejected purely genealogical approaches, and based it mostly on physical appearance and one's "determination to fight for his race". Lane was anti-American, describing the United States as "the most vile political entity on Earth" and as a "red-white-and-blue nasty murder machine". Lane viewed the United States government as part of a Zionist conspiracy. Lane also issued a declaration called "Moral Authority", which calls the United States a "Red, White, and Blue travelling mass murder machine" intent on committing genocide against white people. According to the declaration, "true moral authority belongs to those who resist" this purported genocide. He argued the United States was, from its conception, based on a Masonic and Jewish conspiracy, and that American identity and white identity were fundamentally at odds, writing that "You can no more be both White and American than you can stop the motion of the planets. The singular intent of America in all facets is to mix, overrun and exterminate the White race. How can you be what destroys you?"

Lane looked at race from an esoteric angle and heavily focused on numerology, historical conspiracies stretching back millennia, and numerical codes. Portraying Francis Bacon and Shakespeare as being "adept in ancient divine wisdom" and believing that the Egyptian pyramids were built by "Aryan architects", Lane taught a belief called the "Pyramid Prophecy 666", which included the concept that a Bible code was inserted by "Aryan adepts" within the King James Version of the Christian Bible. Lane's alleged deciphered code described him as being the "man" who is described in the Book of Revelation, with America being the Beast, but that belief was censored by Ron McVan and other strategists who believed that Lane's Messianic / Antichrist claims would be counterproductive by "turning off potential converts". Lane claimed that was the "666 Sun Man" and that America was the "Beast", and that "14-88" was an integral part of coding in his "Pyramid Prophecy" and was fundamental Wotanism (with "88 Lines and 14 Words" being a supplement to 88 Precepts). 1488 is a combination of 14 as in Lane's Fourteen Words and 88, a white nationalist/supremacist abbreviation for "Heil Hitler."

Lane stated that his beliefs can be best summarized by a slogan he called the "Fourteen Words": "We must secure the existence of our people and a future for White children." He also coined a second 14-word slogan: "because the beauty of the White Aryan woman must not perish from the earth." He wrote a novel elaborating on his views, KD Rebel. The scholar George Michael compared it to The Turner Diaries in its intention and focus on revolution.

=== 88 Precepts ===
While he was in prison, Lane wrote the 88 Precepts as a treatise on his views on race, politics, and philosophy (88 is a common alpha numeric code to praise Adolf Hitler, as "Heil Hitler" uses the eighth letter of the English alphabet, H, for the start of both words). Lane viewed these as the principles behind the two "Fourteen Words" slogans. The 88 Precepts are critical of democracy and oppose government under the claim of taxation as theft. They also promoted servant leadership, a Deistic theological view, and rejected racial integration, calling it a "euphemism" for "White genocide." Lane's writing also sought to establish a white ethnostate in North America and in Eastern Europe.

"88 Precepts" is one of several key texts, printed and distributed through 14 Word Press, including the "White Genocide Manifesto" (which contained 14 key points). As in his other writings, Lane repeats the claim that white people are threatened by a lack of exclusive territorial hegemony and "forced racial mixing".

Consistent with the restrictive gender roles which were practiced within Aryan Nations, precept 35 of "88 Precepts" regards homosexuality as unnatural and also views sex as an act of reproduction which should be performed for the sole purpose of increasing the size of the white population. Lane also considers sex as a motivation for male subjugation of women, who are expected to be subservient. Lane advises men to subjugate women via power and control of territory, and he also advises white men to take up arms for this purpose. According to its web site, the United Klans of America viewed the 88 Precepts as "a source for which we can ascertain lasting truths".

=== Wotansvolk ===
Lane was one of the founders of the Wotansvolk movement, a white supremacist form of Odinism which he formed with his wife Katja in 1995 in order to promote his ideology which pursued a program of concerted outreach to prisoners. Wotansvolk combines an "Aryan call to arms" with an esoteric teaching, partially based on Jungian psychology, völkish philosophy, and National Socialism. Lane distanced himself from universalist Odinists (including "folkish Asatru") who did not embrace "survival of the Aryan race" as a core part of the movement. Lane argued with Stephen McNallen, then leader of the Asatru Folk Assembly when Lane was alive. By 2017, McNallen came out with support for Lane's 14 Words, quoting them verbatim. Aiming to foment a white revolution, Wotansvolk endorsed "leaderless resistance," a strategy which was popularized by Louis Beam, a Klan veteran and a longtime friend of the Lane family.
