= Talk Radio (film) =

1988 film by Oliver Stone

- Theatrical release poster
- Directed by: Oliver Stone
- Screenplay by: Eric Bogosian; Oliver Stone
- Based on: Talk Radio by Eric Bogosian; Ted Savinar Talked to Death: The Life and Murder of Alan Berg by Stephen Singular
- Produced by: Edward R. Pressman; A. Kitman Ho
- Starring: Eric Bogosian; Alec Baldwin; Ellen Greene; Leslie Hope; John C. McGinley; John Pankow; Michael Wincott
- Cinematography: Robert Richardson
- Edited by: David Brenner; Joe Hutshing
- Music by: Stewart Copeland
- Production company: Cineplex Odeon Films
- Distributed by: Universal Pictures
- Release date: December 21, 1988 (U.S.)
- Running time: 110 minutes
- Country: United States
- Language: English
- Budget: $4,000,000 (estimated)
- Box office: $3,468,572

Talk Radio is a 1988 American drama thriller film directed by Oliver Stone and starring Eric Bogosian, Alec Baldwin, Ellen Greene, and Leslie Hope. The film was based on the play of the same name by Bogosian and Tad Savinar. Portions of the film and play were based on the assassination of Denver radio host Alan Berg in 1984 and the book Talked to Death: The Life and Murder of Alan Berg by Stephen Singular. The film was entered into the 39th Berlin International Film Festival, where it won the Silver Bear.

== Plot ==
Barry Champlain, a sharp-tongued Jewish radio host in Dallas, is known for his provocative political views and condescending attitude toward his callers. On the night his show is being considered for national syndication, a move that would make him rich and famous, Barry wrestles with self-doubt, arrogance, and self-loathing.

Flashbacks reveal Barry's humble beginnings as a menswear salesman who impresses a customer, local radio host Jeff Fisher, with his conversational flair. Invited on Jeff's show as a guest, Barry quickly outshines him and lands his own show, rising to the top of the ratings as a confrontational “shock jock.” As he becomes more successful, Barry is targeted by far-right militants and receives threatening fan mail. While he reaches new success in his professional life, his personal life deteriorates as his marriage falls apart.

In the present, Barry invites his ex-wife Ellen, whom he still loves, to the studio for advice on the syndication deal. Worried about his state of mind and trying to reach him in his comfort zone, Ellen calls into the show live and professes her love and concern. Though Barry shares her feelings, he masks his vulnerability by cruelly attacking Ellen on-air as the production staff look on in shock.

In a climactic monologue, Barry spirals out of control and confesses his cynicism to his audience, admitting he exploits them and is terrified of what they represent. Yet rather than repel them, Barry is informed that his meltdown is now the highest-rated segment in the show's history, and the syndication deal is approved.

After the broadcast, Barry heads to his car, where a fan asks for an autograph. As he signs, the "fan" pulls a gun and fatally shoots him. The film ends with voices from Barry's life, now callers to his show, playing over images of the Dallas skyline.

== Cast ==
- Eric Bogosian - Barry
- Alec Baldwin - Dan
- Ellen Greene - Ellen
- Leslie Hope - Laura
- John C. McGinley - Stu
- John Pankow - Dietz
- Michael Wincott - Kent
- Zach Grenier - Sid Greenberg
- Anna Levine - Woman at the Basketball Game
- Robert Trebor - Jeffrey Fisher
- Linda Atkinson - Sheila Fleming
- Allan Corduner - Vince

In addition, a plethora of actors provides the voices of one or more "on-air callers" heard during the film, including Rockets Redglare, who appears briefly at the end of the film as the person who murders Barry. Wincott, Levine, Trebor, and Corduner, each credited above for on-screen characters, also provided voices for callers.

== Production ==
Eric Bogosian wrote the screenplay with help from director Oliver Stone. The script was almost entirely based on Bogosian's Pulitzer Prize-nominated original play with some biographical information about Alan Berg, a talk show host in Denver who was murdered in 1984 by white supremacists. In his research for the film version, Bogosian often watched the on-air production of Tom Leykis' talk show, then originating from Los Angeles station KFI. Bogosian's fictional character shares many speech patterns and mannerisms with Leykis. Alan Berg's former producer Anath White was a technical advisor on the film.

Filming took place mainly in Dallas, Texas and Irving, Texas. Unlike the film, the original play takes place entirely during the on-air broadcast, and there are no scenes outside the radio station. Pre-production began in January 1988 but was briefly delayed after Stone and his wife suffered the stillbirth of their second child. According to biographer James Riordan, Stone kept his loss private from the cast and crew, channeling his grief into the film's production. That emotional pain also influenced the screenplay, prompting Stone to introduce darker elements not present in the original play.

Universal Pictures distributed the film solely in the United States, while Cineplex Odeon Films directly distributed it in Canada and independent distributors released the film in other countries. 20th Century Fox distributed the film in the United Kingdom.

== Reception ==
=== Box office ===
The film was a box office bomb, making $3.4 million on an estimated $4 million budget.

=== Critics' reviews ===
Talk Radio received mostly positive reviews from critics. On Rotten Tomatoes, the film has an approval rating of 85% based on 52 reviews. The consensus summarizes: "The gripping union of a director and star at the peak of their respective powers, Talk Radio offers the viewer a singularly unlikable character and dares you to look away." Metacritic, which uses a weighted average, assigned the film a score of 66 out of 100, based on 21 critics, indicating "generally favorable" reviews.

== See also ==
- List of American films of 1988

== Bibliography ==
- Rossi, Umberto. “Acousmatic Presences: From DJs to Talk-Radio Hosts in American Fiction, Cinema, and Drama”, Mosaic, 42:1, March 2009, pp. 83–98.
