= Talk Radio (play) =

1987 play written by Eric Bogosian

- Written by: Eric Bogosian
- Characters: Barry Champlain
- Genre: Drama
- Setting: Cleveland, Ohio

Premiere
- Date: May 28, 1987
- Place: The Public Theater

Talk Radio is a 1987 Pulitzer Prize-nominated play written by Eric Bogosian, based on a concept by Bogosian and Tad Savinar. The play centering around a shock jock originated off-Broadway at The Public Theater in 1987 where it became a finalist for the Pulitzer Prize for Drama. It made its Broadway debut in 2007 which earned two Tony Award nominations for Best Revival of a Play and Best Actor in a Play for Liev Schreiber. The play was adapted into a 1988 film of the same name directed by Oliver Stone.

== Plot ==
The story follows Barry Champlain, a Cleveland-area shock jock, on the eve of his radio show's national syndication.

== Cast and characters ==
Characters	Off-Broadway debut (1987)	Film adaptation (1988)	Broadway debut (2007)
Barry Champlain	Eric Bogosian	Eric Bogosian	Liev Schreiber
Dan Woodruff	Mark Metcalf	Alec Baldwin	Peter Hermann
Ellen		Ellen Greene	
Laura		Leslie Hope	
Stu Noonan	John C. McGinley	John C. McGinley	Michael Laurence
Dietz		John Pankow	
Kent	Michael Wincott	Michael Wincott	Sebastian Stan
Sid Greenberg	Zach Grenier	Zach Grenier	Adam Sietz

== Production history ==
The play, with Bogosian in the lead role, premiered off-Broadway at The Public Theater on May 28, 1987, in a production directed by Frederick Zollo. The production also featured John C. McGinley, Zach Grenier, Mark Metcalf, and Peter Onorati. A production was staged at the Edinburgh Festival Fringe in 2006, directed by Stewart Lee, featuring Mike McShane, Phil Nichol, and Stephen K. Amos.

Talk Radio made its Broadway premiere on March 11, 2007, in a production starring Liev Schreiber, and featuring Stephanie March and Peter Hermann (Law & Order: SVU), and Sebastian Stan (Captain America: The Winter Soldier). The opening night cast also included Christine Pedi, Barbara Rosenblat, Adam Seitz, Marc Thompson, Kit Williamson, Cornell Womack and Christy Pusz. The show made its final Broadway performance at the Longacre Theater on June 24, 2007.

== 1988 film adaptation ==
A film adaptation of Talk Radio, directed by Oliver Stone, was released one year later. Bogosian reprised the title role; however the setting was changed from Cleveland to Dallas. It also starred Alec Baldwin and one of the play's co-stars, John C. McGinley.

== Awards and nominations ==
=== 1987 Off-Broadway production ===
Year	Award ceremony	Category	Nominee	Result	Ref.
1987	Pulitzer Prize	Pulitzer Prize for Drama	Eric Bogosian	Finalist	

=== 2007 Broadway production ===
Year	Award ceremony	Category	Nominee	Result	Ref.
2007	Tony Award	Best Revival of a Play	Eric Bogosian	Nominated	
2007	Tony Award	Best Actor in a Play	Liev Schreiber	Nominated	
2007	Drama Desk Award	Outstanding Revival of a Play		Nominated	
2007	Drama Desk Award	Outstanding Actor in a Play	Liev Schreiber	Nominated	
2007	Drama Desk Award	Outstanding Sound Design	Richard Woodbury	Nominated	
2007	Drama League Award	Distinguished Revival of a Play		Nominated	
2007	Outer Critics Circle	Outstanding Revival of a Play		Nominated	
2007	Outer Critics Circle	Outstanding Lead Actor in a Play	Liev Schreiber	Nominated	

== Bibliography ==
- Rossi, Umberto. “Acousmatic Presences: From DJs to Talk-Radio Hosts in American Fiction, Cinema, and Drama”, Mosaic, 42:1, March 2009, pp. 83–98.
