= Zionist Occupation Government conspiracy theory =

Antisemitic conspiracy theory

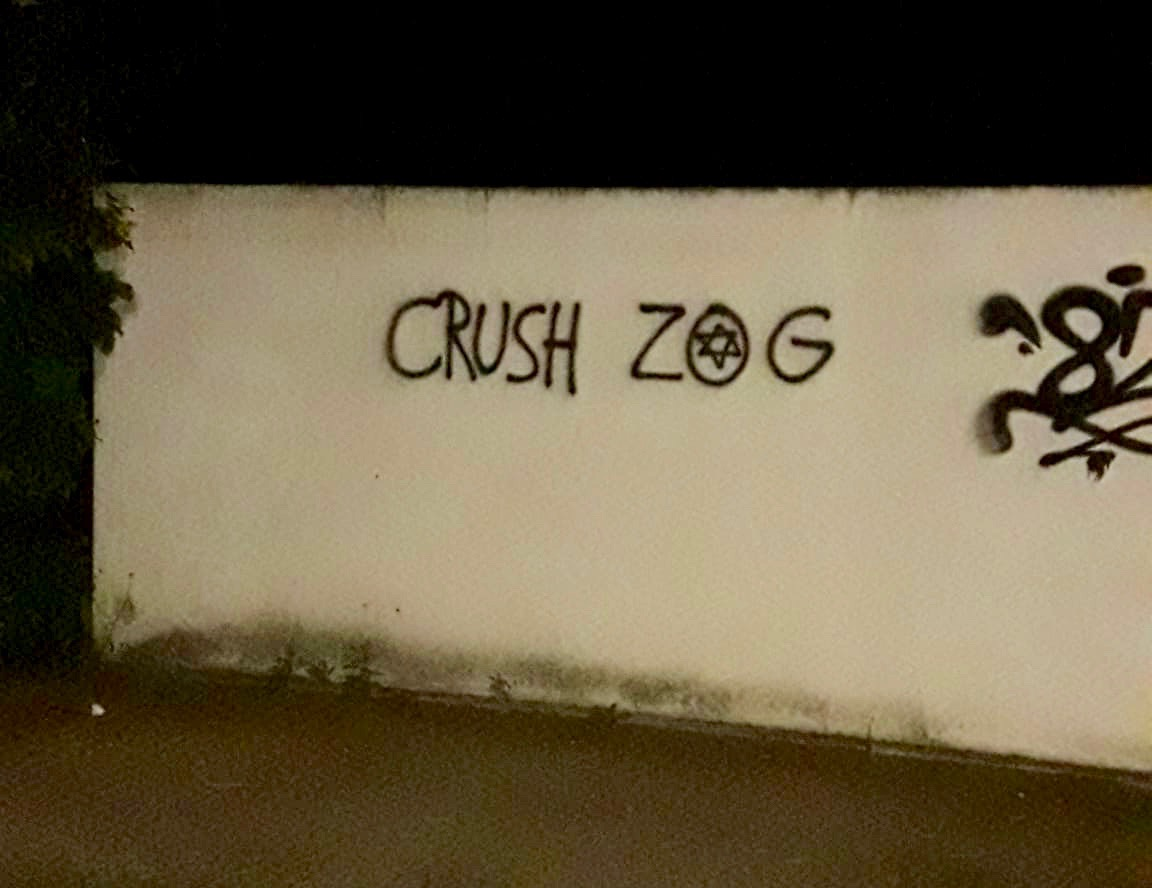
Antisemitic graffiti using the term

The Zionist Occupation Government, Zionist Occupational Government, or Zionist-Occupied Government (ZOG), sometimes also called the Jewish Occupational Government (JOG), is a term for the government of the United States used by adherents of an antisemitic conspiracy theory that claims that Jews secretly control the U.S. government. Some later versions apply it to the governments of other countries. ZOG is often directly personified as the Anti-Defamation League due to its conflicts with the neo-Nazi movement. The word Zionist in "Zionist Occupation Government" is used to equate being Jewish with the ideology of Zionism, depicting Zionists as conspiring on behalf of Jews and Israel. Neo-Nazis also use the term ZOG and its derivatives more generically as a pejorative.

The term "Zionist Occupation Government" and the acronym "ZOG" were coined in a 1976 article by the neo-Nazi activist Eric Thomson. The concept was further developed and spread in the 1970s by American white supremacists, particularly by Christian Identity adherents. The highly publicized criminal actions of the neo-Nazi group the Order, who used the term, resulted in a rise in its popularity among white supremacists. The expression is used by various white supremacist and far-right groups and individuals in both the U.S. and Europe, particularly in Scandinavia.

== Conspiracy and terminology ==
The Zionist Occupation Government (ZOG) is a term used to refer to the federal government of the United States used by adherents of a conspiracy that claims that Jews secretly control the U.S. government. Some later versions apply the conspiracy to the governments of other countries. Alternate terms for the same idea include Zionist Occupational Government, Zionist-Occupied Government, and Jewish Occupational Government (JOG). Various terms derived from the base "ZOG" are used by proponents, e.g. "the Zog-press", "police swine of ZOG", "ZOG-bots", or "Zoglandia". Many neo-Nazis also use the term ZOG and its derivatives merely as a racist term without particular ideological attachment to the conspiracy.

The word Zionist in "Zionist Occupation Government" is used to equate being Jewish with the ideology of Zionism. The theory thus depicts Zionists as conspiring for Jews and Israel to control the world. Believers in ZOG see it as a secret, all-powerful government entity, sometimes of the whole world. Scholar Jeffrey Kaplan defined the idea as "a deeply Manichaean conceptualization of the federal government and of what is seen as its Jewish puppeteers". Immigration and racial integration are seen as a plot by ZOG. Those who use the term also attack those they see as "race traitors".

Neo-Nazis often personify ZOG as the Anti-Defamation League, due to its many conflicts with the neo-Nazi movement. The association of Jews with the control of economic forces is a modern resurgence of an old stereotype, that of the "greedy Jewish merchant", present in the Christian world since the Middle Ages. The conspiracy theory illustrates a specifically American far-right agrarian preoccupation, namely the possibility of extinction allegedly faced by the rural world, seen as the backbone of America, a danger caused by a remote, centralized, power-hungry metropolitan elite corrupted by "alien" influences. Most ZOG theories involve the idea of Jewish power over finance or banking, such as control of the Federal Reserve.

== Analysis ==
In 2000, scholar Jeffrey Kaplan called the "ZOG discourse" "at once the most caricatured and the most characteristic facet of the American radical right wing today". Several scholars have noted the term tends to be used by particularly militant neo-Nazis. According to Tore Bjørgo, the associated ideologies evince "considerable violent potential", where violence against "ZOG" is considered "fully legitimate", and "the radical racist ZOG discourse [goes] considerably further in terms of justifying extreme violence than the more 'moderate' nationalist anti-immigrant activists normally do in their rhetoric".

Katrine Fangen argued that neo-Nazis often do not use the term literally or as evidence of ideological commitment to the conspiracy, but rather as an internal code; Bjørgo agreed, writing, "the adoption of such an extreme discourse is probably often a way to express their solidarity with the group and its values, even if they may not themselves literally believe in the reality of 'ZOG'." Kjetil Braut Simonsen said that though this may be the case, "this does not mean that antisemitism was of secondary importance. Rather, it shows that anti-Jewish norms and language were a defining feature of the milieu, a marker for militancy and dedication".

Helene Lööw argues that ZOG is best considered an evolution of early conspiracy theories of Jewish control of the world. Kaplan wrote that the ZOG concept was the reification of the neo-Nazi movement's "perception of unremitting persecution". He described it as emphasizing the neo-Nazi movement's perception of itself "as relentlessly persecuted by the inextricable forces of the state and the Jews, as personified in particular by the ADL." Bjørgo wrote:

For European right-wingers, just as for their American colleagues, it was an appealing post-communist answer to their quest for demons. The communist "evil empire," which had long haunted the extreme right and served as its great Satanic enemy, may be gone, but the real demonic people, the Jews, are still around. Better organized than ever around their Zionist center in Israel and heavily represented in government, business, the media, and the dominant liberal culture, the Jews are again considered the real threat for the Aryan race. [...] There is now, so it appears to the neo-Nazis, a much greater appeal for their racist interpretation of reality and for the ZOG conspiracy theory.

Micah Issit and Carlyn Main compared it to other anti-Jewish conspiracies they saw as similar, such as the claim that as many as 4,000 Jews were warned of the September 11 attacks. They also argue that there is, in "a more general sense", a conspiratorial idea that forces analogous to ZOG control U.S. foreign policy; the U.S. pro-Israel lobby is seen as evidence of this. They note that "critics of theories in this vein have argued that pro-military and Christian lobbies exercise far more influence over U.S. spending than the pro-Israel lobby and have proposed that this suggests, if nothing else, a Christian conspiracy".

== History ==
=== Background ===
In late 19th-century France, the insinuation that Jews controlled the French government was commonplace in anti-republican discourse. Early ideological influences on the conspiracy include the antisemitic The Dearborn Independent and the forged tract The Protocols of the Learned Elders of Zion.

The origins of the ZOG idea specifically are connected to the U.S. civil rights landscape and particularly Jewish anti-hate activist groups. In an effort to stop antisemites like Gerald L. K. Smith and George Lincoln Rockwell (the leader of the American Nazi Party) from getting attention and therefore more power, the Jewish watchdog organization the American Jewish Congress (AJC) encouraged a "quarantine" of them in the media by asking Jewish groups and newspapers not to react to their provocations. Kaplan identifies Rockwell's frustration with this policy and his later assassination as the origin of the ZOG idea, which served to reinforce his followers' belief in a Jewish conspiracy, as they considered the policy evidence of collusion between these groups and the government.

After Rockwell's assassination, his party ceased to be perceived as a real threat to the Jewish community, and it devolved into schismatic factions. The AJC was meanwhile largely supplanted by the Anti-Defamation League (ADL) as the most prominent Jewish watchdog group. Antisemitism had declined in the U.S. and neo-Nazi movements were struggling to remain relevant, but in its opposition to the American neo-Nazi movement the ADL was far more aggressive than either the U.S. government or the AJC. It regularly engaged in dubiously legal and outright illegal activities in order to surveil and counter the neo-Nazi movement. Kaplan attributes the prevalence of the ZOG idea among neo-Nazis to their resulting belief that "the ADL was an omnipresent—and, indeed, omnipotent—presence".

=== Coinage and use by the Order ===
The specific term "Zionist Occupation Government" was coined by the American neo-Nazi Eric Thomson in a 1976 article. Thomson was allegedly a former agent for the Central Intelligence Agency, then a neo-Nazi activist. (Note: George Michael noted Thomson as a particularly obscure neo-Nazi. Thomson coauthored a book with Ernst Zündel in 1977, The Hitler We Loved and Why. He assisted George P. Dietz in his operation of Liberty Bell Publications, and also went by the name Eric Campbell. Holocaust denier and fellow Liberty Bell writer David McCalden claimed that Thomson had been deported from Rhodesia for being a neo-Nazi and that he had been an intelligence officer for the CIA in South America (from which he was also eventually deported for being an intelligence agent for the United States).) He was an Odinist; he wrote hundreds of articles over the next few decades on ZOG and other white supremacist topics, until 2003. He also wrote white supremacist fiction.

The ZOG concept and terminology were developed and spread in the 1970s by American white supremacists, particularly adherents of Christian Identity, a white supremacist interpretation of Christianity. Increasing conflict between the far-right movement and the government in the 1980s strengthened their idea of being persecuted by "ZOG". The term was used extensively by the Aryan Nations, a Christian Identity group led by Richard Girnt Butler. The Aryan Nations believed the only way to combat ZOG was to form a white ethnostate in the Pacific Northwest that would secede from what they called the "Jew-nited States of America". They used the term in their 1996 "Declaration of Independence".

The term became popular and received public attention after The New York Times reported on December 27, 1984, on crimes committed in California and Washington by the white supremacist group the Order, an offshoot of the Aryan Nations, which used the term to refer to the U.S. government. According to the Times, the crimes "were conducted to raise money for a war upon the United States government, which the group calls 'ZOG', or Zionist Occupation Government." During the final confrontation with the Order's leader, Robert Jay Mathews, the FBI (as a joke due to the Order's usage of the term) wore baseball hats emblazoned "ZOG"; Mathews was burned alive during the confrontation. Neo-Nazis came to see him as a martyr.

=== Spread ===
As the Order and their crimes gained notoriety, the term spread in usage among the far-right in the 1980s and 1990s. David J. Moran declared "war on ZOG" in a "Last Will and Testament" before dying in a shootout in with police in California in 1986. In the testament, Moran wrote:

Thus I…have declared war on ZOG…

I know that most of my people will not understand my motives nor my actions…yet they remain immutably worthy, necessary, and in the final analysis, inevitable. To watch my people devoured by Judaism and not resist would destroy me just as surely as ZOG’s bullets and jails…

I KNOW NOT WHEN I WILL DEPART FROM THIS EARTH, ONLY THAT IT WILL BE SOON. I leave with no regrets. There is nothing here to hold me. I am a stranger in my own land and to my people. Alienated from the dominate [sic] trends of judaized culture, disgusted by its commercialism, its art, its music, its politics, and above all, its hypocrisy.

In 1987, the white supremacist Frazier Glenn Miller Jr. declared "total war" against ZOG, then disappeared, leading to a national manhunt for him. During the 1988 Fort Smith sedition trial of several influential white supremacists, including Butler, Louis Beam called their acquittal a defeat for ZOG and said he had been "punished for being a vociferous and outspoken opponent of ZOG"; Miller was given a lesser prison sentence for testifying against them at the trial.

Randy Weaver, involved in the 1992 Ruby Ridge standoff, where several members of his family were killed by the U.S. government, was a fanatical believer of the ZOG conspiracy; he was photographed in 1989 wearing a shirt that read "Just Say 'No' to ZOG". After the standoff, Weaver became a popular figure on the far-right. The 1993 Waco siege, which took place while legal developments in the Weaver case were ongoing, further cemented the ZOG idea in the American far right. The far right further radicalized in this period, leading to increased popularity of the conspiracy theory. It became much more popular in the 1990s.

Though the term initially referred to the U.S., it soon spread to Europe; European neo-Nazis were using it in reference to their governments by the late 1980s, particularly in Scandinavia. In Sweden, the term was probably first used by the magazine Vit Rebel in 1989. In Norway, it primarily emerged out of the white power skinhead subculture, and was in use by at least 1991. The terminology spread through white power music in the U.S. and Europe. Norwegian neo-Nazi musician and murderer Varg Vikernes claimed that Scandinavia and Germany were also under the control of ZOG. In the 2010s, Slovak politician Marian Kotleba claimed that the "Z. O. G." controls Slovak politics.

== See also ==
- The Eternal Jew (film)
- The Foundations of the Nineteenth Century
- The International Jew
- New World Order conspiracy theory
- QAnon
- Dominant minority
- Ethnocracy
