= Robert Jay Mathews =

American neo-Nazi (1953–1984)

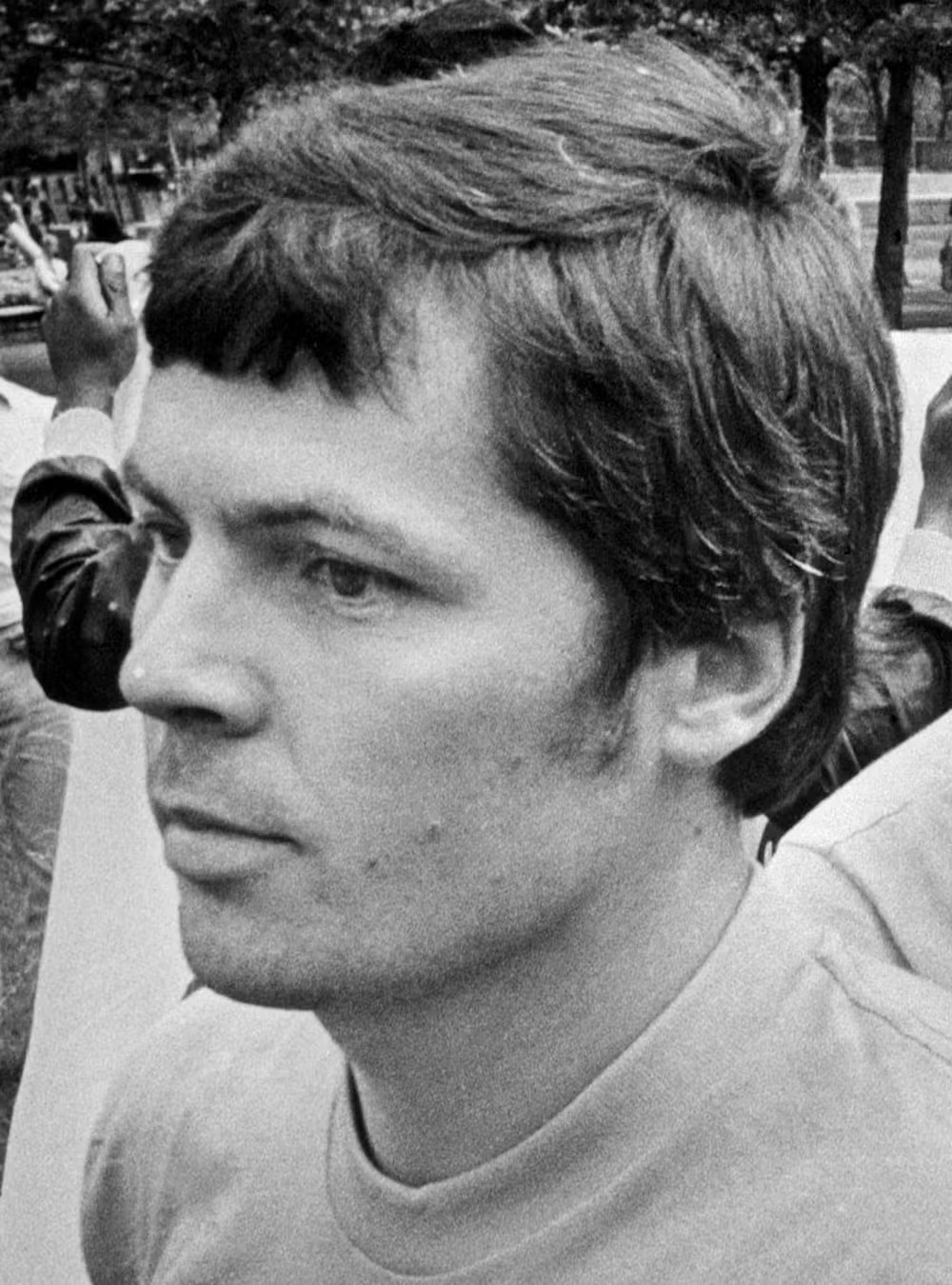
- Mathews in 1983
- Born: January 16, 1953; Marfa, Texas, U.S.
- Died: December 8, 1984 (aged 31); Whidbey Island, near Freeland, Washington, U.S.
- Cause of death: Smoke inhalation and fire
- Organization(s): Sons of Liberty; The Order
- Spouse: Debbie McGarity (m. 1976)
- Children: 2

Robert Jay Mathews (January 16, 1953 – December 8, 1984) was an American neo-Nazi and the leader of The Order, an American white supremacist militant group that committed counterfeiting, several bank robberies, car heists, murders, and assassinations. Mathews is believed to have served as a lookout in the murder of Alan Berg. Before founding The Order, Mathews was a member of the neo-Nazi groups the National Alliance and Aryan Nations.

He was burned alive during a shootout with approximately 75 federal law enforcement agents who surrounded his house on Whidbey Island, near Freeland, Washington. Following his death, other White supremacists viewed him as a martyr and memorialized him.

== Early life ==
=== Family life ===
Robert Jay Mathews was born in Marfa, Texas, on January 16, 1953, to Johnny and Una Mathews (née Grant). His father Johnny Mathews was of Scottish descent. A businessman and veteran of World War II, he had served as the mayor of Marfa and the President of their Chamber of Commerce, and leader of the local Methodist church. Una and Johnny Mathews had been married by a Presbyterian Church in April 1943, in Detroit. The couple had three sons, all spaced four years apart: Grant, Lee, and then Robert Mathews. His family was lower middle class.

His family moved often in his youth, seeking business opportunities. The family eventually settled in Phoenix, Arizona. When Mathews was six years old, his older brother Grant was diagnosed with schizophrenia, and repeatedly attempted suicide. This resulted in Mathews's parents having to spend more time devoted to him than their other children, and some amount of neglect towards Lee and Robert, for which they felt guilt. Robert became closer with Lee as a result.

=== Education and early political interests ===
Mathews received average grades in most fields of study, but excelled in topics he was interested in, especially history and the American Civil War. In October 1964, at age 11, to the surprise of his parents, he declared that he would join the John Birch Society, a right-wing advocacy group. His father was enraged, but his mother defended his interest, saying it was good he was interested in the world; he was allowed to join. He attended McClintock High School. During high school, the peak of the 1960s counterculture, Mathews did not do drugs, date, or smoke, and once took his own mother to a meeting about the dangers of rock and roll music. Many students at his school were Mormons, and Mathews, admiring their lifestyle, decided to be baptized into the Church of Jesus Christ of Latter-day Saints in 1969. His parents were against it but eventually relented. By the age of 15, Mathews had become anti-government and had affiliated with the tax protesting movement.

When he was 17, he attended a tax resistance protest, to the chagrin of his parents, who were beginning to worry about him and his increasingly revolutionary, anti-government ideas. He got into a debate with his economics teacher about Keynesian economics, which he believed was socialist, and afterwards stopped attending the class entirely. He declared he would not go to college as colleges were "hotbeds of communism". He instead desired to attend the United States Military Academy, but changed his mind after the My Lai massacre. When the perpetrators were punished for "following orders", he decided that he no longer wanted to be part of the US Army. His father forced him to take the test, whereupon Mathews failed due to his score on math; he may have failed on purpose. He was not allowed to graduate high school due to his refusal to take the economics course.

== Tax resistance movement ==
Mathews co-founded the Sons of Liberty in 1971, an anti-communist militia whose members were mainly Mormon survivalists. They engaged in sometimes violent activism, holding a TV station hostage in 1972 to get more publicity for the group. At this time he worked odd jobs in the Phoenix area. In 1973, after filling out his employer's W-4 Form claiming ten dependents, reportedly as an act of tax resistance, he was arrested for tax fraud, tried, and placed on probation for six months.

== White supremacy ==
Mathews became disillusioned by the lack of support he had received by other right-wing activists after his conviction. When his probation ended, Mathews moved in July 1974 to Metaline Falls, Washington, in the Pacific Northwest, because he liked the countryside. He promised his parents that he would cease political extremist activity so they would move north with him. He married Debbie McGarity, with whom he adopted a son. At the same time he worked in a mine and then successively a cement plant; he attempted to make a living off the ranch he lived on, but was unsuccessful.

Despite his promise to cease engaging in far-right activism, while in Metaline Falls, Mathews became a white supremacist. He joined William Luther Pierce's National Alliance in 1980, which he saw as more intellectual than the other white supremacist groups, and began distributing National Alliance literature to make money. Mathews became fascinated by Pierce's 1978 novel The Turner Diaries, which reinforced his anti-government ideas. He became an associate of Richard Girnt Butler, Christian Identity preacher and the leader of Aryan Nations, and adopted many of his ideas. His political ideology was influenced by his reading William Gayley Simpson's Which Way Western Man? and Oswald Spengler's The Decline of the West.

Mathews came to see Butler as unwilling to act on his word, as not being a man of action. In 1982 Mathews formed the White American Bastion, a splinter group of Aryan Nations, in an effort to recruit white families to the Pacific Northwest. In 1983, Mathews delivered a speech, "A Call to Arms", at a National Alliance convention reporting on his efforts to recruit on behalf of the organization, especially among "the yeoman farmers and independent truckers," to his White American Bastion group. This speech was widely publicized among the racist movement. That year, his father died, and Mathews became more engrossed in white supremacist politics. He largely abandoned Christianity for Odinism, though most of his followers were from Christian Identity origins.

=== The Order ===
In late September 1983, at a barracks he constructed on his property in Metaline, Mathews and eight other men founded the militant neo-Nazi organization The Order, also known as the Silent Brotherhood. The mission of The Order was to obtain enough resources to eventually overthrow the American "Zionist Occupation Government" (ZOG). The Order was based directly on and named after a group from The Turner Diaries.

The group's first task, according to Mathews's plan, was to obtain money to support white separatism and to finance a guerrilla campaign against the American government. They robbed an adult bookstore in Spokane, Washington, which netted them $369.10. They agreed that was too risky, and turned to robbing armored cars and counterfeiting. They printed some counterfeit $50 bills, and 28-year-old Bruce Pierce was arrested after passing off a few of them.

To raise Pierce's bail, Mathews, acting alone, robbed a bank just north of Seattle, Washington, stealing around $26,000. Some of The Order's members, along with a new recruit, Gary Yarbrough, carried out more robberies and burglaries, which netted them over $43,000. A subsequent robbery yielded several hundred thousand dollars. Another recruit, Tom Martinez, was caught and charged for passing more counterfeit currency. Then in July 1984, they deployed approximately a dozen men in a successful effort to rob a Brink's truck of $3,600,000. On October 2, 1984, he had a daughter born out of wedlock.

The group distributed some of the stolen money to the North Carolina–based White Patriot Party and other white nationalist organizations. The group also committed acts of murder and assassinations. Mathews and the other members of The Order were eventually betrayed by Martinez, who became an FBI informant after his arrest for counterfeiting. After he revealed information regarding Mathews's activities to the FBI, agents moved to capture Mathews and his associates, leading to one of the largest manhunts in FBI history. Martinez set up Mathews and another member of The Order in a hotel sting operation in Portland, leading to a shootout with the FBI. Mathews wounded an officer and escaped.

=== Final days ===
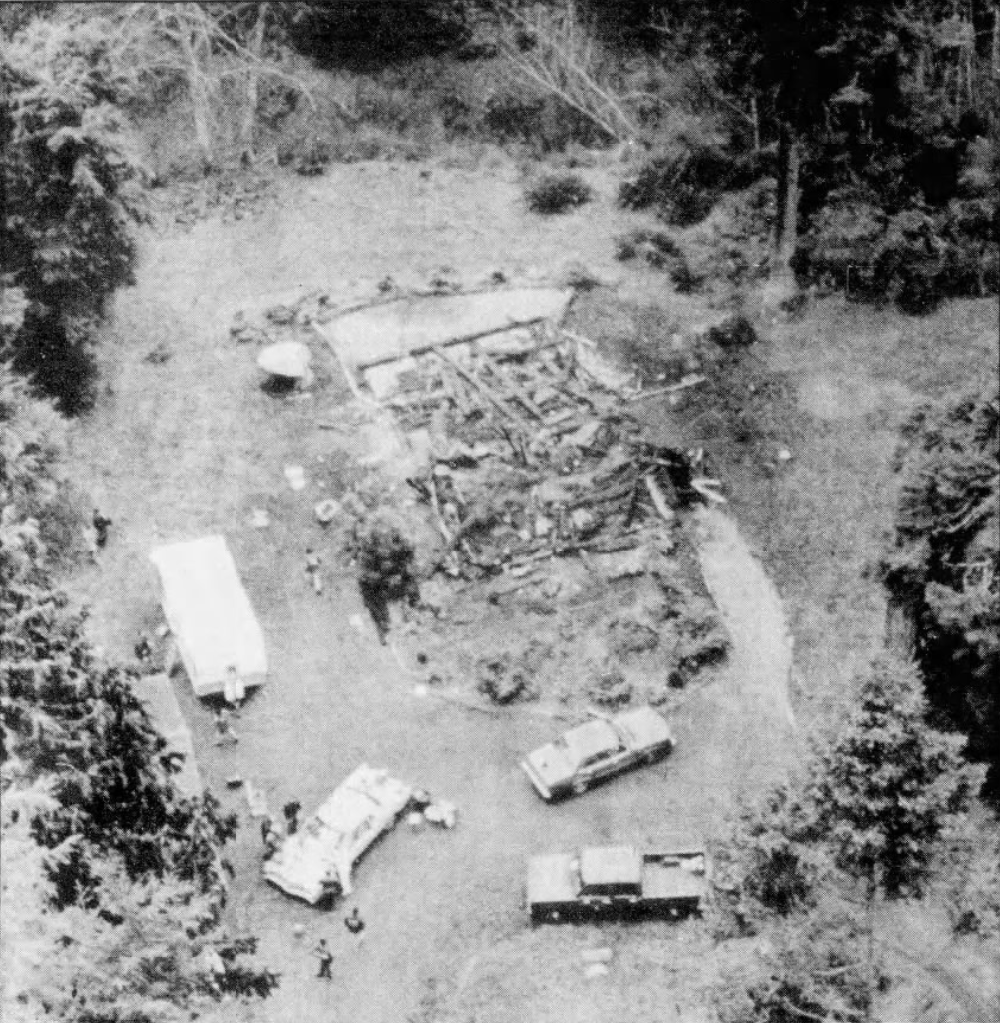
The house where he hid out, after the fire

After escaping from the shootout, wrote a long letter declaring war on the federal government of the United States and justifying his group's actions. He sent this letter, titled "Declaration of War", to several newspapers. He explained the reasons for his decision to "quit being the hunted and become the hunter," and closed by writing,

I am not going into hiding, rather I will press the FBI and let them know what it is like to become the hunted. Doing so it is only logical to assume that my days on this planet are rapidly drawing to a close. Even so, I have no fear. For the reality of my life is death, and the worst the enemy can do to me is shorten my tour of duty in this world. I will leave knowing that I have made the ultimate sacrifice to ensure the future of my children.

By the time they could set up the operation, all of Mathews's accomplices and friends had decided to move to safe houses. The government's agents surrounded Mathews in a house near Freeland, Washington, on Whidbey Island on December 7, 1984. They attempted to get him to surrender and leave the house; Mathews refused.

Negotiations continued until December 8, when Mathews refused to talk further. The FBI then fired dozens of smoke grenades into the house in an attempt to force Mathews out, but did not know he possessed a gas mask, which thwarted this effort. During the final confrontation, some FBI agents jokingly wore baseball hats emblazoned "ZOG". Mathews opened fire on several agents who attempted to enter the house, and a long standoff began. When a helicopter appeared at nightfall, Mathews opened fire on it from an upstairs window—the helicopter's crew was unhurt—and then once again exchanged gunfire with federal agents. An FBI agent then fired three M79 Starburst flares inside the house from the helicopter, setting off a box of hand grenades and a stockpile of ammunition. Mathews continued to fire an assault rifle at agents as the house burned, but then suddenly stopped. After the wreckage had cooled enough to be searched, agents found the burned remains of Mathews's body, with a pistol still in his hand.

== Aftermath ==
Mathews's remains were cremated and the ashes scattered by his family on his property in Metaline, Washington.

Eventually, dozens were convicted of crimes connected to The Order on a variety of charges, including civil rights violations, racketeering, counterfeiting money, robbery, and conspiracy, among others. Later, ten people connected to the case, including Butler, Lane, and Pierce, were tried for sedition, but were acquitted by a jury.

Following his death, other white supremacists viewed him as a martyr. He has been memorialized in a variety of white power songs, periodicals, and media. Scholar Jeffrey Kaplan wrote in 2000 that "the cult of Robert Mathews continues to grow" and that he continues to be "hailed as a martyr in White racialist circles". His death is memorialized as a holiday, Martyr's Day, among white supremacists.

Mathews was portrayed by Peter Gallagher in the 1999 television film Brotherhood of Murder and by Nicholas Hoult in the 2024 theatrical film The Order.
