= Aryan Nations =

Christian Identity organization

- Aryan Nations Wolfsangel emblem
- Formation: 1970s
- Founder: Richard Girnt Butler
- Type: Christian Identity and neo-Nazi organization
- Headquarters: Kootenai County, Idaho
- Location(s): United States, chapters in Italy, Finland and Denmark

Aryan Nations was a North American neo-Nazi organization that was originally based in Kootenai County, Idaho. Richard Girnt Butler founded Aryan Nations in the 1970s. It adhered to Christian Identity doctrine, a white supremacist interpretation of Christianity. The group had several state chapters, but was very decentralized.

Starting in 1981, Butler organized yearly gatherings of white supremacists at his compound in Idaho which he termed the "Aryan Nations World Congress." In 2001, the Federal Bureau of Investigation (FBI) classified Aryan Nations as a "terrorist threat." In a review of terrorist organizations, the RAND Corporation called it the "first truly nationwide terrorist network" in the United States and Canada.

Due to a decline in Butler's health, his abilities to lead the group faltered in the late 1990s, and the group experienced some schisms, including one led by August Kreis III, whom Butler expelled. After his death in 2004, Aryan Nations schismed further into several different organizations, some of which continue to use the name Aryan Nations.

== History ==
=== Background and founding ===
Aryan Nations beliefs are based on the teachings of Wesley A. Swift, a leading figure in the early Christian Identity movement. Swift was originally exposed to British Israelism while at the Angelus Temple through the teachings of visiting minister Gerald Burton Winrod. Swift was also exposed to Charles Parham's British Israel teachings at the Angelus Temple. Combining British Israelism, extreme antisemitism, and political militancy, Swift later founded his own church in California in the mid-1940s known as the Anglo-Saxon Christian Congregation. He hosted a daily radio broadcast in California during the 1950s and 1960s. In 1957, the name of his church was changed to the Church of Jesus Christ–Christian, a name which continues to be used by Aryan Nations churches.

William Potter Gale introduced Richard Girnt Butler to Swift in 1962. Swift quickly converted Butler, who was an admirer of Adolf Hitler and Wisconsin Senator Joseph McCarthy, to Christian Identity. When Swift died in 1971, Butler fought against Gale, James K. Warner, and Swift's widow for control of the Church of Jesus Christ–Christian. Butler eventually gained control of the organization and moved it from California to Idaho in 1973. After moving to Idaho, Butler founded Aryan Nations as a paramilitary wing of the church with an ideological mixture of Christian Identity and Nazism.

=== Activities ===
From 1974 until 2001, the Aryan Nations headquarters was located in a 20-acre (8.1 ha) compound 1.8 miles (3 km) north of Hayden, Idaho. In 1995, Aryan Nations had 26 state chapters but was very decentralized and the chapters' ties to the organization's headquarters were extremely loose. In addition to the organization in the United States, Aryan Nations had chapters in Europe in Italy, Finland and Denmark. The group hosted an annual World Congress of Aryan Nations at Hayden Lake for Aryan Nations members and members of similar groups. At his first conference, Butler called for the division of the United States into racial mini-states, including a white ethnostate in the Pacific Northwest. He said that he had a black ally in the plan, Louis Farrakhan, leader of the Nation of Islam.

At the 1983 Aryan Nations World Congress, Louis Beam and other leaders in the white power movement declared war on the U.S. government.

Aryan Nations had difficult relations with the city of Coeur d'Alene. In 1986–1987, there were a series of bombings of the homes of local human rights activists, after which, the city and Aryan Nations left each other alone. In 1998, Aryan Nations applied for a permit for a march in downtown Coeur d'Alene. Although the permit was approved, the city declared a public holiday on the same day, resulting in an empty downtown of closed businesses.

=== Shooting, lawsuit and breakup ===
Flag used by Aryan Nations in the 2000s

In September 2000, the Southern Poverty Law Center (SPLC) won a $6.3 million judgment against Aryan Nations from an Idaho jury, who awarded punitive and compensatory damages to plaintiffs Victoria Keenan and her son Jason. The two Native Americans had been beaten with rifles by Aryan Nations security guards in Coeur d'Alene, Idaho in July 1998. The woman and her son were driving near the Aryan Nations compound when their car backfired, which the guards claimed to misinterpret as gunfire. The guards fired at the car, striking it several times. The car crashed and one of the Nations guards held the Keenans at gunpoint, beating them. Two of the assailants, Aryan Nations security chief Edward Jessie Warfield and guard John Yeager, were prosecuted for the attack. Warfield pleaded guilty to aggravated assault and was sentenced to two to five years in prison. Yeager entered an Alford plea for assault and was sentenced to up 2.5 years in prison. A third attacker was never found.

The SPLC filed suit on behalf of the Keenans. A jury found that Butler and Aryan Nations were grossly negligent in selecting and supervising the guards, and awarded the Keenans $6.3 million. A local attorney from Keenan's legal team said that the large verdict was partly to compensate the Keenans, but largely to punish Butler and his followers, and serve to deter similar conduct in the future.

The $6.3 million verdict caused Butler to file for bankruptcy one month later. As part of the bankruptcy process, the group's property was put up for auction. SPLC loaned the Keenans $95,000 to bid on the 20-acre property. In February 2001, the group's Hayden Lake compound and intellectual property, including the names "Aryan Nations" and "Church of Jesus Christ Christian", were transferred to the Keenans. Idaho native and millionaire philanthropist Greg Carr purchased the property from the Keenans, donating it to the North Idaho College Foundation. It has been converted to a park dedicated to peace.

Local fire departments demolished some of the church's former buildings by burning them during training exercises, including the Hayden Lake headquarters on June 29, 2001. Edgar Steele, the attorney who had represented Butler, was later convicted of hiring a handyman to kill his own wife. In 2014, Steele died while serving a 50-year prison sentence.

=== Decline and legacy ===
Until 1998, the leadership of Aryan Nations remained firmly in the hands of Richard Girnt Butler. By that time, he was over 80 years old, and his health was poor. As Butler's health deteriorated, so did his ability to lead the group. This led to a series of violent events in Coeur d'Alene involving skinheads who had infiltrated the group.

At the annual Aryan Nations World Congress in 2001, Neuman Britton was appointed to lead Aryan Nations as Butler's successor. Following Neuman's death in August 2001, Butler appointed Harold Ray Redfeairn of Ohio to lead Aryan Nations as his successor; he had been agitating for control of the organization since the mid-1990s. Redfeairn had brought in Dave Hall, an FBI informant who exposed the group's illegal activities. After this was discovered, Redfeairn was distrusted by some in the group. Redfeairn and August Kreis III, the propaganda minister for Aryan Nations, formed a splinter group, and Butler expelled them from Aryan Nations.

A few months later, Redfeairn returned to form an alliance with Butler. Butler's 2002 World Congress drew fewer than 100 people, and when he ran for mayor, he lost, garnering only 50 votes against more than 2,100 votes. Redfeairn died in October 2003, and Butler died of heart failure in September 2004. At the time of Butler's death, Aryan Nations had about 200 actively participating members.

Aryan Nations was divided between three main factions. The largest group after Aryan Nations' bankruptcy was led by Charles John Juba, followed by August Kreis III until Kreis stepped down as leader and designated Drew Bostwick as his successor in 2012. In 2002, Juba's group was based on a 10-acre (4.0 ha) compound in the rural town of Ulysses in Potter County, north central Pennsylvania; it hosted the 2002 Aryan Nations World Congress.

Kreis established a new headquarters in Lexington, South Carolina, and he eventually moved it close to Union City, Tennessee. In 2005, Kreis received media attention because he attempted to form an Aryan Nations–al Qaeda alliance.

Based in New York, and led by Jay Faber, Aryan Nations Revival became one of the more well-known splinter groups. In the Congressional Record, the leaders of Aryan Nations Revival were listed as domestic terrorists. The government concluded that the Holy Order of the Brotherhood of the Phineas Priesthood was the enforcement/terrorist wing of Aryan Nations. Aryan Nations Revival hosted a weekly radio broadcast which it titled The Aryan Nations Broadcast. Airing from 1979 to 2009, the radio program was authorized by Richard Butler. The program ended when host Hal Turner was arrested for threatening the lives of federal judges in Chicago. While incarcerated, Turner announced, through his attorney, that he was a federal informant, and that Aryan Nations was among those organizations which had been informed upon.

In 2009, Aryan Nations Revival, which was then based in Texas, merged with Pastor Jerald O'Brien's Aryan Nations, which was based in Coeur d'Alene, Idaho. Both parties ardently adhered to Christian Identity.

The most successful splinter group was likely Paul Mullet's Crusaders of Yahweh, which had branches in 17 states.

== Symbols ==
Alternate flag

The emblem (or shield) of Aryan Nations is designed to reflect aspects of British Israelism. It contains a Wolfsangel symbol, the crossbar of which has been replaced by a "crown-topped sword." The Wolfsangel symbol, originally used by ancient Germans to ward off wolves, was used by Nazi organizations, including the Waffen-SS.

== Associates ==
In 1983, Robert Jay Mathews, who had visited the Aryan Nations compound many times, formed The Order, along with Aryan Nations members Dan Bauer, Randy Duey, Denver Parmenter, and Bruce Pierce. The Order's mission was to overthrow the Zionist Occupational Government and establish the Northwest Territorial Imperative through an orchestrated plot to commit acts of domestic terrorism which would include murder, arson, armed robbery, theft, counterfeiting, and extortion between 1983 and 1984. Dennis McGiffen, who also had ties to Aryan Nations, formed a group called "The New Order", inspired by Mathews' group. The members were arrested before they could follow through with their violent plans.

Buford O. Furrow Jr., who was convicted of the Los Angeles Jewish Community Center shooting and the murder of Filipino American postal worker Joseph Ileto, had previously worked as a security guard at the Aryan Nations compound for some time.

On April 4, 2004, intending to start a "Race War", Sean Michael Gillespie (a former member of Aryan Nations) threw a Molotov cocktail at B'nai Temple Israel in Oklahoma City, Oklahoma. There were no casualties, but the building sustained material damage. Gillespie was arrested in Little Rock, Arkansas, on April 16 of the same year, but it was not until August 2005 that he was sentenced to 39 years in prison for attacking the Jewish temple and trying to send a racist letter to the congregation. The defendant raised his hand in a Nazi salute with stiff arms as the judge left the courtroom.

== See also ==
- Aryan Brotherhood
- Aryan Circle
- Aryan Freedom Network, holds events at old Aryan Nations HQ
- Aryan race
- The Foundations of the Nineteenth Century
- Kinism
- Nordicism
- Nordic Israelism
- Positive Christianity
- Robert E. Miles
