= Decal (company) =

American film distribution company

Decal Releasing, LLC
- Trade name: Decal
- Type: Subsidiary
- Industry: Film industry
- Founded: February 2021; 5 years ago
- Headquarters: New York City, New York, U.S.
- Area served: Worldwide
- Parent: Neon
- Website: decalreleasing.com

Decal Releasing, LLC, doing business as Decal, is an American independent film distribution company. Launched in February 2021 as a joint venture between Neon and Bleecker Street, the latter would quietly divest its stake in the company sometime in 2025.

== History ==
The distribution companies Bleecker Street and Neon had signed multi-year deals with Universal Pictures Home Entertainment for the home media releases of their films. When these deals came close to expiring, Bleecker Street and Neon collaborated to launch Decal in February 2021. The company's purpose is to distribute and handle the home entertainment releases for their films as well as the films from Greenwich Entertainment. Decal also has the ability to purchase third-party content for distribution. It is overseen by Neon's Andrew Brown and previously Bleecker Street's Kent Sanderson before he was promoted. Decal's team included Sara Castillo as Senior Vice President (SVP) of Marketing and Distribution, Ayo Kepher-Maat as SVP of Acquisitions, who works alongside Catillo to oversee day-to-day operations, and Lilly Stuecklen as Distribution Manager. Kepher-Maat left in 2025.

In March 2021, the company acquired the North American rights to Gaia, a South African horror-thriller. In May 2021, Decal acquired Ride the Eagle, a comedy film starring Jake Johnson, D'Arcy Carden, J. K. Simmons, and Susan Sarandon; it was released the following month in 15 theaters and through on-demand. In July, Decal purchased the rights to Recovery, a comedy from former Studio C cast members Mallory Everton, Stephen Meek, and Whitney Call. The film was retitled Stop and Go and released on October 1, 2021, in select theaters and straight-to-video. On October 18, Decal acquired the rights to The Last Victim, a thriller starring Ron Perlman, Ali Larter, and Ralph Ineson. On October 26, Decal signed a multi-year deal to handle the home entertainment releases of all titles released by XYZ Films.

In May 2022, the company acquired the rights to I'm Totally Fine and The Offering from that year's Marché du Film.

In May 2026, Decal was reported to be in talks to partner with Row K Entertainment on the release of Cliffhanger; it was concurrently revealed that Bleecker Street had quietly divested its stake in the company in 2025, making Neon the sole owner of Decal.

== Filmography ==
=== 2020s ===
Release date	Title	Ref.
June 18, 2021	Gaia	
July 30, 2021	Ride the Eagle	
October 1, 2021	Stop and Go	
December 10, 2021	The Last Son	
May 13, 2022	The Last Victim	
November 4, 2022	I'm Totally Fine	
January 13, 2023	The Offering	
March 24, 2023	Perfect Addiction	
October 20, 2023	Tripped Up	
January 19, 2024	Which Brings Me to You	
March 21, 2025	McVeigh	
May 2, 2025	Words of War	
June 6, 2025	Emmanuelle	
TBA	Sirius	
