= Neon (company) =

American independent film production and distribution company

Neon Rated, LLC
- Trade name: Neon
- Type: Subsidiary
- Industry: Film industry
- Predecessor: Radius
- Founded: January 13, 2017; 9 years ago
- Founder: Tom Quinn; Tim League
- Headquarters: New York City, U.S.
- Key people: Kim Kalyka (vice president); Christina Zisa (EVP)
- Owner: Department M (majority); 30West (minority)
- Number of employees: 60 (as of March 2025)
- Divisions: Neon TV; BH Tilt (with Blumhouse Productions); Decal; Super LTD
- Website: neonrated.com

Neon Rated, LLC, doing business as Neon (stylized in all caps), is an American independent film production and distribution company founded in 2017 by CEO Tom Quinn and Tim League, who also was the co-founder of the Alamo Drafthouse Cinema chain. As of 2019, League is no longer involved with daily operations for the company.

Its first film, Colossal, was released in 2017. The company became known for distributing such notable films as I, Tonya (2017), Parasite (2019), Portrait of a Lady on Fire (2019), Palm Springs (2020), Flee (2021), Spencer (2021), The Worst Person in the World (2021), Triangle of Sadness (2022), Anatomy of a Fall (2023), Anora (2024), Longlegs (2024), The Seed of the Sacred Fig (2024), and The Monkey (2025).

Parasite went on to become Neon's highest-grossing film at the box office with $53 million and the first non-English-language film to win the Academy Award for Best Picture. In 2024, Longlegs had a domestic box office gross of $74.3 million, becoming the distributor's highest-grossing film ever in North America. Anora became the company's second film to win the Academy Award for Best Picture. Neon has also worked with several high-profile filmmakers, which includes Sean Baker, Bong Joon Ho, Julia Ducournau, Craig Gillespie, Pablo Larraín, and Céline Sciamma.

== History ==
During the 4th Annual Zurich Summit, Tom Quinn commented on Neon's intent to release titles that appeal to audiences who "skew under 45, that have no aversion to violence, no aversion to foreign language and to non-fiction". Reflecting on their early approach, Quinn stated in 2024: "We were very much a startup, with everyone functioning as this sophisticated amoeba. [...] That work enabled us to sit at the table in Toronto that year and buy I, Tonya. Before the ink was even dry on the deal, we were planning its Oscar campaign. It's a testament to how quickly we can make decisions because we're not this big studio. We've always used that to our advantage."

In September 2017, the company partnered with Blumhouse Productions to manage BH Tilt. In 2018, a majority stake of Neon was sold to 30West, the media venture arm of "The Friedkin Group". In February 2021, Bleecker Street partnered with Neon to launch the joint home entertainment distribution company Decal, which is a standalone full-service operation that handles distribution deals on the home entertainment rights to both Neon and Bleecker Street's features. The first film to be distributed through Decal was the Bleecker Street release Supernova in winter 2021. Additionally, Decal acquired North American distribution rights to the South African horror film Gaia for a summer theatrical release, marking their first ever acquisition.

Andrew Brown (Co-President of Decal) oversaw the launch of Neon's home entertainment division. In 2022, Brown was promoted to "President of Digital Distribution". The exec, who has served as "SVP of Digital Strategy, Marketing, and Distribution" for Neon since 2017, also manages Neon's library, and oversees the annual FYC DVD Box Set and direct-to-consumer digital portal "Neon Cinema". Prior to the joint-venture, Universal Pictures Home Entertainment, as well as The Criterion Collection and Well Go USA Entertainment (for the film Possessor which Neon and Well Go co-distributed), distributed several Neon films on home video.

During the 2023 Hollywood labor disputes, which took place from May 2 to November 9, Neon was approved to continue promotional activities for its films since the company does not have ties to the Alliance of Motion Picture and Television Producers (AMPTP) nor had encountered any issue in receiving SAG-AFTRA interim agreements.

In August 2023, Neon hired former A24 employees Alexandra Altschuler as "VP Media" and Don Wilcox as "VP Marketing". That same month, Neon hired former Sierra/Affinity employee Kristen Figeroid as "President of International Sales and Distribution", Laurel Charnetsky as "VP International Acquisitions & Operations", and Dan Stadnicki as "Manager, International Sales & Distribution". In May 2024, Neon hired Joey Monteiro as "EVP, International Marketing" and Ashley Hirsch as "Manager of International Sales and Marketing". That same month, Neon promoted Elissa Federoff from "President of Distribution" to "Chief Distribution Officer" and Ryan Friscia from "EVP, Finance and Business Development" to "Chief Financial Officer". Furthermore, Jeff Deutchman, who joined Neon when it was launched, serves as "President of Acquisitions and Production".

Additionally, Neon has acquired the distribution rights to seven Palme d'Or winners at the Cannes Film Festival: Parasite (2019), Titane (2021), Triangle of Sadness (2022), Anatomy of a Fall (2023), Anora (2024), It Was Just an Accident (2025), and Fjord (2026); all seven won consecutively. The company's strategy to acquire such titles at Cannes is to eschew "the lazy approach", said Deutchman. "The only real way to do Cannes is to go see as many movies as you can, because you never know where the next Dogtooth or Border or Hunger or Force Majeure is going to come from", he added, citing several modern Cannes standouts championed by arthouse buyers. After acquiring Parasite in 2018, Neon financed and distributed the film the following year in U.S. territories. "From the very beginning, Tom Quinn saw Parasite as a universal film and refused to put it in a box as a foreign-language or international film", said Parasite director Bong Joon Ho. "He saw the heart of the film and understood that it was about all of us living in our modern class-based society. I was always grateful for that." Neon spent $20 million promoting, distributing, and campaigning for the film's awards. The film subsequently became Neon's highest-grossing film with more than $53 million at the box office and won four Academy Awards, including Best Picture and Best Director. Similarly, Neon spent $18 million promoting Anora, three times the film's original budget. Anora ultimately won the two aforementioned Academy Awards while Anatomy of a Fall and Triangle of Sadness were nominated for the same two categories, among others. As of March 2025, Neon has garnered 39 Academy Award nominations, winning 11 overall.

In 2023, Quinn commented on the company's success at Cannes, saying: "We've seen over the years that each of these films, because of their credibility and success, the Palme d'Or has come to mean something quite impactful for a very young group of cinephiles. And the reason why we know this is we've tested all these movies and dating back to Parasite, probably I think, the fifth reason why people came to see the film, in its test screening in Sherman Oaks, was the fact that it won the Palme d'Or, and each subsequent year that went up. And this year, the number one reason why people came to see the film [Anatomy of a Fall], at a test screening in Burbank, was the fact that it had won the Palme d'Or." In 2024, Quinn stated: "The award means a lot. To audiences here who are looking for the absolute most adventurous, forward-looking cinema available, that award represents it because these films have delivered, and they've been major Oscar contenders."

In July 2024, Neon had its biggest opening weekend at the box office with the horror thriller film Longlegs with $22.6 million from 2,510 theaters (including $2.5–3 million in Thursday previews). It placed second for the weekend, behind Universal/Illumination's second weekend of Despicable Me 4. Initially projected to gross $7–9 million, the opening marked the biggest total for an original horror film of 2024, one of the top 20 weekends for an independent film and the best opening ever for an independent horror film. To promote the film, Neon utilized guerrilla marketing tactics similar to those used by The Blair Witch Project (1999). Director Oz Perkins credited Neon for the film's marketing, stating the studio "really responded strongly to the movie, the raw materials of the movie really excited them, the way it looks, the way it feels, the way it sounds. They asked me early on, 'Do we have your permission to kind of go nuts?' And I said, 'What else are we doing here? Go for it. Do your thing.'" The film's total marketing budget was under $10 million, focusing on digital content and not having television ads. During its third weekend, Longlegs became the company's highest-grossing film at the domestic box office, earning $58.6 million, surpassing what Parasite earned with $53.3 million in 2020. Furthermore, it became the top grossing R-rated horror film of 2024 and the highest-grossing indie horror film of the last decade, topping A24's Talk to Me (2022), Insidious: Chapter 3 (2015) from Focus Features, and A24's Hereditary (2018). Afterward, furthering their marketing campaign, from August 1 to 4, Neon (partnering with Atom Tickets) offered free tickets to anyone who has a birthday that falls on the 14th of any given month. To get the tickets, those who registered and purchased tickets through Atom Tickets received a special promo code after verifying their date of birth and were able to get one free ticket per customer, while supplies lasted.

At the 78th Cannes Film Festival in May 2025, Neon won their sixth Palme d'Or in a row for Iranian filmmaker Jafar Panahi's It Was Just an Accident. Joachim Trier's Sentimental Value won the Grand Prix, while Óliver Laxe's Sirāt was tied for the Jury Prize and Kleber Mendonça Filho's The Secret Agent won Best Director for Mendonça and Best Actor for Wagner Moura.

In February 2026, Neon was reported to be in talks to sell a majority stake in the company to Department M, a production and financing company founded by Mike Larocca and Michael Schaefer. The transaction officially closed in July 2026; former parent 30West remains a significant shareholder, and its parent, the Friedkin Group, remains among Neon's board members. As a result, Department M co-founder Larocca was appointed as a board member at Neon, and Schaefer was made Neon's Chief Content Officer. The establishment of a television division named Neon TV was also announced, with Carina Sposato hired as the division's EVP.

== Filmography ==
Highest-grossing films in North America
Rank	Title	Year	Domestic gross	Ref.
1	Longlegs	2024	$74,346,140	
2	Parasite	2019	$53,847,897	
3	The Monkey	2025	$39,724,909	
4	I, Tonya	2017	$30,014,539	
5	Together	2025	$21,273,159	
6	Anora	2024	$20,474,295	
7	Ferrari	2023	$18,550,028	
8	Hokum	2026	$16,147,621	
9	Immaculate	2024	$15,671,307	
10	EPiC: Elvis Presley in Concert	2026	$13,571,883	
