= Ride the Eagle =

2021 American film by Trent O'Donnell

- Theatrical release poster
- Directed by: Trent O'Donnell
- Written by: Jake Johnson; Trent O'Donnell
- Produced by: Huey M. Park; Jake Johnson; Trent O'Donnell; Joe Hardesty; D'Arcy Carden
- Starring: Jake Johnson; D'Arcy Carden; J. K. Simmons; Susan Sarandon
- Cinematography: Judd Overton
- Edited by: Daniel Haworth
- Music by: Jeff Cardoni
- Production company: JTJ Films
- Distributed by: Decal
- Release date: July 30, 2021
- Running time: 88 minutes
- Country: United States
- Language: English
- Budget: $10 million

Ride the Eagle is a 2021 American comedy film directed by Trent O'Donnell, who co-wrote the screenplay with Jake Johnson. It stars Johnson, Susan Sarandon, J. K. Simmons, and D'Arcy Carden. Produced by The Walcott Company, it was released by Decal theatrically and through video on demand on July 30, 2021.

== Plot ==
Leif Reinhold, a 40ish, perpetually adolescent man working as a band percussionist, lives in his friend Gorka's shed in Los Angeles, and is devoted to his black labrador Nora.

One day, he is informed that his hippy mom Honey has died of cancer. He greets the news with an indifferent shrug: she abandoned him at 12 to join a cult and had not contacted him since. She had tried to reach out toward the end, but he had rebuffed her.

Honey has left him her wood cabin in Yosemite – under the condition of completing a to-do list, explained on a pre-recorded video. The point of the tasks is to make a numbed Leif feel something, a final last effort to mend fences with him. Leif goes to the cabin and discovers the cabin's cabinets are stashed with marijuana. At first, it seems that she is just messing with him—one request is to row across the lake and sneak into a house to drop off what turns out to be a kiss-off note. He almost gets caught after leaving it, forcing him to sneak away. Another charges him with catching a fish for his dinner using his bare hands. So, he spends most of a day in a nearby stream, trying to catch one.

Another request is to call "the one that got away" and apologize for his mistakes, leading him to reestablish contact with former girlfriend Audrey. They turn out to still have some chemistry over the phone, but she is hesitant to do anything about it as she is recovering from a recent breakup. They try to have phone sex, but Leif has no idea how to, so Audrey soon gives up. She agrees to visit him at the cabin.

The next day, Gorka calls Leif to give him bad news. Not only does the rock band of youngsters for which he plays bongos wants him out, but the shed where he was living at the back of his property has been deemed illegal, and has to be destroyed. Leif looks out to see someone has gutted two rabbits and smeared them over the windshield of his van. So, after he cleans it up, he sees the next task which is to play a song from the heart on the bongos. After doing so, Audrey calls back to say she is not coming.

Leif goes for a walk, leaving a reluctant Nora behind. On his return, she has disappeared. Frantic, he contacts the police and finally leaves a note in the cabin he had left the original note in, asking him not to hurt her. That night, the mysterious angry neighbor breaks into the cabin and, similarly to calls he had made earlier, insults him in a jealous way. The neighbor, Carl had believed Leif was one of her numerous lovers (which included himself), not her son. Carl explains they had been on a break, thus having no idea she had passed, and also does not have Nora. He tells him she had felt terrible when Leif refused to speak to her as an adult. Carl rambles about everything he will miss about Honey, and he and Leif make amends.

The last request is to hike to Green Lake. There, he is directed to find and scatter Honey's ashes and read a note written by her. When he returns to the cabin, he finds Carl has found and returned Nora while taking all the marijuana, and the last of Honey's video tells him to reconsider and live his life.

Leif and Audrey text again, and he decides to take the eight-hour drive to see her.

== Cast ==
- Jake Johnson as Leif Reinhold
- D'Arcy Carden as Audrey
- J. K. Simmons as Carl
- Susan Sarandon as Honey Reinhold
- Luis Fernandez-Gil as Gorka
- Cleo King as Missy
- Eric Edelstein as Officer Mike Nilsons

== Production ==
Ride the Eagle was announced on May 18, 2021, when Decal acquired the distribution rights to the project and gave it a release date for July 30, 2021. In a statement, co-writer Jake Johnson said that as filming took place during the COVID-19 pandemic, "Trent O'Donnell and I wanted to make a movie about people coming together." The film score was composed by Jeff Cardoni. In the United Kingdom, the film was released by Lightbulb Film Distribution in November 2021.

== Reception ==
On the review aggregator website Rotten Tomatoes, 81% of 37 critics' reviews are positive, with an average rating of 6.1/10. The website's consensus reads: "Minor yet charming, Ride the Eagle achieves sufficient altitude thanks to a sweet story and strong work from the Jake Johnson-led cast." Metacritic, which uses a weighted average, assigned the film a score of 54 out of 100, based on 9 critics, indicating "mixed or average" reviews.

Variety's Joe Leydon wrote, "Ride the Eagle likely will be most warmly embraced by viewers who have experienced profoundly mixed emotions when hearing about the death of a loved one who frequently was extremely difficult to love. On the other hand, the movie's seriocomic consideration of how messy familial, sexual and professional relationships can be should have a well-nigh universal resonance."
