= Martha Sherrill =

American writer

- Born: Palo Alto, California, U.S.
- Occupations: Journalist; novelist; writer
- Spouse: William Powers
- Writing career
- Genres: Fiction, Non-fiction
- Notable work: Dog Man: An Uncommon Life on a Faraway Mountain
- Website: marthasherrill.com

Martha Sherrill is an American journalist, non-fiction writer, and novelist. She is the author of Dog Man: An Uncommon Life on a Faraway Mountain.

== Biography ==
Born in Palo Alto, California, Sherrill grew up in Glendale, California and graduated from UCLA with a degree in art history. She later moved to Washington, DC where she became a staffer at The Washington Post and a contributing editor at Esquire Magazine. One of her most notable pieces for Esquire was the 1996 article "Dream Girl", a hoax profile of a supposed up-and-coming "It Girl"/movie star named Allegra Coleman. Sherrill later used the article as the basis for her first novel, My Last Movie Star (2003).

The Atlantic highlighted Sherrill's Esquire Classic podcast feature “My Father the Bachelor” as a "Gateway Episode".

== Personal life ==
Sherrill is married to author William Powers and has a son.

== Selected works ==
=== Novels ===
- My Last Movie Star. Random House. 2003. ISBN 978-0-375-50769-4.
- The Ruins of California. Penguin Press. 2006. ISBN 978-1-59448-231-1.

=== Non-fiction ===
- The Buddha from Brooklyn. Random House. 2000. ISBN 978-0-679-45275-1.
- Dog Man: An Uncommon Life on a Faraway Mountain. Penguin Press. 2008. ISBN 978-1-59448-390-5.
