= Jeff & Some Aliens =

American adult animated sitcom

- Genre: Comedy
- Created by: Sean Donnelly; Alessandro Minoli
- Based on: Jeff & Some Aliens by Video Lou
- Starring: Brett Gelman; Alessandro Minoli
- Composer: Cyrus Shahmir
- Country of origin: United States
- Original language: English
- No. of seasons: 1
- No. of episodes: 10

Production
- Executive producers: Alexander Bulkley; Corey Campodonico; Sean Donnelly; Alessandro Minoli
- Running time: 22 minutes
- Production companies: Video Lou; ShadowMachine; Comedy Partners

Original release
- Network: Comedy Central
- Release: January 11 – March 15, 2017

Related
- TripTank

Jeff & Some Aliens is an American adult animated sitcom created by Sean Donnelly and Alessandro Minoli. It is based on sketches from TripTank. The series stars Brett Gelman and Alessandro Minoli. The series aired on Comedy Central from January 11, 2017, to March 15, 2017.

The plot surrounds three aliens who travel to Earth to find the most average person to test and understand humans. Most episodes revolve around Jeff having a problem that the aliens can fix with a strange device.

On December 1, 2017, the series was canceled after one season.

== Cast ==
- Brett Gelman as Jeff Mahoney
- Alessandro Minoli as Jimmy / Ted / Sammy
- Jon Daly as Chet
- Josh Fadem as Dave
- Marc Evan Jackson as Zoops
- Mark Ivanir as Evgeny
- Patrick St. Esprit as Nick
- Alicia Silverstone as Alison, Jeff's Sister
- Zack Pearlman as Corey
- Helena Mattsson as Inga
- Tress MacNeille as Pam, Jeff's Mom
- Richard Kind as Stanley, Jeff's Dad
- Natalie Smyka as Linda
- Hannah Heller as Sally
- Kesha as Znorla

== Episodes ==
No.	Title	Directed by	Written by	Original release date	Prod. code	US viewers (millions)
1	"Jeff & Some Honor Killings"	Alessandro Minoli and Sean Donnelly	Alessandro Minoli and Sean Donnelly	January 11, 2017	101	0.300
After Jeff inadvertently murders an alien on the planet Azuria, he is forced to kill a human on Earth in order to prevent an intergalactic war.
2	"Jeff & Some Energy Trading"	Alessandro Minoli and Sean Donnelly	Alessandro Minoli and Sean Donnelly	January 18, 2017	102	0.284
Jeff uses an alien machine to trade his life energy in exchange for luxury items that he uses to impress his girlfriend, Linda – but things quickly spiral out of control.
3	"Jeff & Some Preteen Girls"	Alessandro Minoli and Sean Donnelly	Kristy Grant	January 25, 2017	103	0.331
The aliens help Jeff pilot a robotic preteen girl so that he can infiltrate his niece's social circle and convince her to pursue her artistic dreams.
4	"Jeff & Some Laughs"	Alessandro Minoli and Sean Donnelly	Alessandro Minoli	February 1, 2017	104	0.319
When Jeff's father is put on life support after a serious car accident, Jeff tries to save him by using an alien device that harnesses the healing power of laughter.
5	"Jeff & Some Colonists"	Alessandro Minoli and Sean Donnelly	Sam West	February 8, 2017	105	0.280
An Azurian orders aliens to colonize Earth and direct their resources toward producing fruit smoothies.
6	"Jeff & Some Confidence"	Alessandro Minoli and Sean Donnelly	Joe DeRosa	February 15, 2017	106	0.268
Jeff uses an alien device that alters his memories in order to give himself more confidence.
7	"Jeff & Some Jeffs"	Alessandro Minoli and Sean Donnelly	Tom O' Donnell	February 22, 2017	107	0.277
With the aliens away on vacation, Jeff accidentally uses a device that gives everyone on Earth his exact personality traits.
8	"Jeff & Some Childlike Joy & Whimsy"	Alessandro Minoli and Sean Donnelly	Ed Herro	March 1, 2017	108	0.353
Jeff tries to renew his old best friend's zest for life by slipping him a psychoactive substance.
9	"Jeff & Some Love"	Alessandro Minoli and Sean Donnelly	Brian Donovan	March 8, 2017	109	0.275
The aliens give Jeff an ultimatum: win over his crush Linda within 50 days, or the planet will be destroyed.
10	"Jeff & Some Love Simulations"	Alessandro Minoli and Sean Donnelly	Sean Donnelly	March 15, 2017	110	0.252
The aliens try to help Jeff find his soulmate by running simulations with miniature clones; Jeff's chances with one prospect are thrown into jeopardy when her doppelgänger escapes.
