= McVeigh (film) =

2024 American film

- Release poster
- Directed by: Mike Ott
- Written by: Alex Gioulakis; Mike Ott
- Produced by: Miles Alva; Nicolaas Bertelsen; Joe Pirro; Shaum S. Sengupta; Monte Zajicek
- Starring: Alfie Allen; Brett Gelman; Ashley Benson
- Cinematography: Daniel Vignal
- Edited by: Dagmawi Abebe
- Music by: Adam Weiss
- Production companies: CinemaWerks; Rouge Wave Pictures; Symbolic Exchange
- Distributed by: Decal
- Release dates: June 7, 2024 (Tribeca Festival); March 21, 2025
- Running time: 90 minutes
- Country: United States
- Language: English

McVeigh is a 2024 American drama film co-written by Mike Ott and Alex Gioulakis, and directed by Ott. It is based on the true story of domestic terrorist Timothy McVeigh, the perpetrator of the Oklahoma City bombing in 1995. (Note: However, the film's end credits include the disclaimer that "The characters and events portrayed in this motion picture are fictitious. Any similarity to actual persons, living or dead, or to actual events is purely coincidental.") McVeigh is played by Alfie Allen. The film premiered at the Tribeca Festival on June 7, 2024. It was released on digital platforms and in theaters on March 21, 2025.

Filming took place in Northern Kentucky.

== Plot ==
Timothy McVeigh is a quiet, solitary and self-kept army veteran who sells anti-government stickers at roadside fairs in Kansas and Oklahoma. Outraged by the events at the Waco siege, McVeigh watches the news of President Clinton and Attorney General Janet Reno accusing the Branch Davidians of child abuse and provoking the FBI response. McVeigh then visits white supremacist and convicted murderer Richard Wayne Snell, who has his execution date set for April 19, 1995. After several visits to Tucker Unit in Arkansas, McVeigh is convinced that he has to do something to fight the government. He recruits fellow army veteran Terry Nichols to help him gather the materials to build a bomb, including fertilisers and nitrate. While planning his actions, McVeigh is approached by Frédéric, a French Canadian who lives in Elohim City and knows of McVeigh's connections with Snell.

After paying a visit to Elohim City, McVeigh grows suspicious of Frédéric and leaves abruptly, accelerating his plans to bomb the Alfred P. Murrah Federal Building in Oklahoma City. In the meantime, McVeigh meets Cindy, a waitress at a roadside gas station with whom he develops a quick sexual bond. However, when Cindy stays at McVeigh's home, he becomes paranoid that she could find out about his plan. Following the collapse of the relationship with Cindy, McVeigh fully commits to executing the bombing; he rents a truck and has Nichols assist him in loading the explosives into the vehicle. The day of the attack, McVeigh goes to Nichols's home but finds that he has left. He then calls an unknown individual from a public phone, subsequently fetching this person to go to Oklahoma City; the face of the individual is never shown.

The morning of April 19, 1995, as McVeigh and the unknown companion drive to downtown Oklahoma City, murderer Richard Snell is seen in seclusion at Cummins Unit, waiting for his execution to take place. In the end, a series of real-life news clips featuring families of the victims and images of the bombing show the devastation of McVeigh's actions, who is shown justifying his actions in archive footage from an interview with 60 Minutes.

== Cast ==
- Alfie Allen as Timothy McVeigh
- Brett Gelman as Terry Nichols
- Ashley Benson as Cindy
- Anthony Carrigan as Frédéric
- Tracy Letts as Richard Snell
- Isolda Dychauk as Jen
- Karen Suriano as Marife
- Courtney Warner as Karen

== Reception ==
On the review aggregator website Rotten Tomatoes, 67% of 18 critics' reviews are positive, with an average rating of 5.8/10.

Owen Gleiberman of Variety wrote, "[T]he time is more than right for a movie like McVeigh, which records how its subject's descent into terrorism was propelled by the ideas of the new right-wing zealotry." Damon Wise of Deadline wrote, "Ott carefully keeps us at arm's length from his subject at all times, and his direction makes that clear from the outset. When we're not following McVeigh, played with impressive, surly opacity by Britain's Alfie Allen, we're observing him, almost like wildlife and usually in his car. Ott uses master shots, or medium close-ups, then slowly closes in, but we never get too close."
