= William Powers (writer) =

American writer and journalist (born 1961)

- Born: March 14, 1961 (age 65)
- Education: Harvard College
- Occupations: Writer and journalist
- Spouse: Martha Sherrill
- Writing career
- Notable work: Hamlet's BlackBerry: A Practical Philosophy for Building a Good Life in the Digital Age
- Literary movement: Humanism
- Website: www.williampowers.com

William Powers (born March 14, 1961) is an American writer, journalist, and technologist. He is the author of Hamlet's BlackBerry: A Practical Philosophy for Building a Good Life in the Digital Age.

== Life and career ==
Powers grew up in Rhode Island, and graduated from Harvard University with a degree in history and literature. He did graduate study in Spain, then moved to Washington, DC, where he was a U.S. Senate aide working on foreign relations, intelligence and military affairs.

Then, Powers joined The Washington Post. His writing has appeared in The Atlantic, The New York Times and many other publications. He created The New Republic's first media column, and wrote a column about the intersection of media and politics that appeared in Atlantic Media's National Journal and The Atlantic online.

== Awards, fellowships and talks ==
Powers is a two-time winner of the National Press Club's Rowse Award for media criticism. He was a Media Fellow at Harvard's Shorenstein Center and a resident fellow at the MacDowell Colony.

He has given keynote talks at conferences such as South by Southwest and the Aspen Ideas Festival.

== Bibliography ==
- Hamlet's Blackberry: A Practical Philosophy for Building a Good Life in the Digital Age, HarperCollins, 2010. ISBN 0061687170
