= The Last Victim (2021 film) =

2021 American film by Naveen A Chathapuram

- Theatrical release poster
- Directed by: Naveen A Chathapuram
- Screenplay by: Ashley James Louis
- Story by: Doc Justin; Naveen A Chathapuram
- Produced by: Vicky Gong; Shaun Sanghani; Todd Berger; Naveen A Chathapuram; Graem Luis; Nick Burnett; Luke Daniels; Joseph Lanius; Charles Leslie; Frank Li
- Starring: Ali Larter; Ralph Ineson; Tahmoh Penikett; Ron Perlman; Kyle Schmid; Dakota Daulby; Camille Legg; Tom Stevens
- Cinematography: Lukasz Pruchnik
- Edited by: John Chimples
- Music by: Darren Morze
- Production companies: Peach Partners; Slated Concourse Media; Immortal Thoughts; SSS Entertainment; SSS Film Capital; The Catalyst Group Entertainment; Sprockefeller Pictures
- Distributed by: Decal
- Release dates: September 16, 2021 (Oldenburg); May 13, 2022 (United States)
- Running time: 103 minutes
- Country: United States
- Language: English

The Last Victim is a 2021 American neo-noir, neo-Western crime-thriller film directed and produced by Naveen A Chathapuram in his directorial debut from a screenplay by Ashley James Louis, based on a story by Doc Justin and Chatapuram. It stars Ali Larter, Ralph Ineson, Ron Perlman, Kyle Schmid, Dakota Daulby, Camille Legg, and Tom Stevens. The plot follows a sheriff's pursuit of a violent gang that is chasing a witness to their crimes.

The film premiered at the Oldenburg International Film Festival on September 16, 2021. It was released in the United States on May 13, 2022, by Decal.

== Premise ==
A group of outlaws, led by the charismatic Jake Samuels, is pursued by the aging Sheriff Hickey and his deputy Mindy Gaboon after a crime goes wrong in the American Southwest. The gang of outcasts soon crosses paths with Susan Orden, an anthropologist with OCD, and her husband, Richard, who witness them in the midst of covering up a horrendous crime. Soon after, Susan is pursued by the outlaw group with the hopes of making her the last victim.

== Cast ==
- Ali Larter as Susan
- Ralph Ineson as Jake
- Ron Perlman as Sheriff Herman Hickey
- Tahmoh Penikett as Richard
- Kyle Schmid as Bull
- Dakota Daulby as Tad
- Tom Stevens as Manny Randowski
- Camille Legg as Deputy Mindy Gaboon
- Paul Belsito as Snoopy
- Gregory Fawcett as Deputy Dale
- Matt Brown as Monroe
- Kit Sheehan as Glenda Hickey
- Trish Allen as The Waitress
- Budge Winter as The Old Man

== Production ==
The Last Victim was conceptualized over fifteen years before its release. Director Naveen A Chathapuram was introduced to the storyline by anthropologist Dr. Neal 'Doc' Justin and the two were originally going to make the feature as an ultra-low budget independent genre film in the vein of Breakdown (1997). After a fire at the intended shooting location shelved the project, Chathapuram went on to make other films in the role of a producer, such as CA$H, which was an early starring role for Chris Hemsworth. About fifteen years after shelving the project, Chathapuram rediscovered the idea for The Last Victim while he was planning his directorial debut. Chathapuram approached up-and-coming screenwriter Ashley James Louis to write a new version of the script based on the original story Chathapuram and "Doc" Justin had written. The project needed to be updated and fleshed out if it was to meet the new ambitions Chathapuram had set out for this his directorial debut. Louis agreed, and soon turned in a first draft that went on to get a Script Score of 76 on SLATED. Chathapuram then brought on a series of producers and investors and was eventually able to raise around $2 million in order to fund the low-budget independent film. During this time, Ralph Ineson (The Witch, The Green Knight) was cast as "Jake Samuels". Ali Larter (Final Destination, Resident Evil franchises) was cast as "Susan Orden" and Ron Perlman (Hellboy, Nightmare Alley) was cast as "Sheriff Hickey". With the principals and supporting actors cast, the film went into production, and was soon after shot in Canada in just under three weeks. The COVID-19 pandemic interrupted post-production, pushing back the premiere of the film until 2021's Oldenburg International Film Festival. Decal would later release the film in theaters and VOD on May 13, 2022. The film serves as Chathapuram's directorial debut.

== Release ==
The film premiered at the Oldenburg International Film Festival on September 16, 2021, where it was nominated for The German Independence Award "Best Film - Audience Award". Decal acquired the distribution rights soon after. The acquisition deal was negotiated by Ayo Kepher-Maat of Decal with Jared Goetz at Ascending Media Group. The film was released in theaters and on VOD on May 13, 2022.

== Reception ==
On the review aggregator website Rotten Tomatoes, 29% of 14 critics' reviews are positive, with an average rating of 4.5/10. Metacritic, which uses a weighted average, assigned the film a score of 34 out of 100, based on 5 critics, indicating "generally unfavorable" reviews.

In general, the film received mixed reviews from mainstream critics. Among the positive reviews, Rabbit Reviews gave the film a "9/10", pointing out the "philosophical" narration as a highlight of the feature. Andrew Buckner of Without Your Head and Jim Morazzini of Voices from the Balcony both gave the film a "4/5", with Andrew Buckner calling it "...a layered, thoughtful, and satisfying dose of gritty cinematic pulp fiction." and Jim Morazzini saying it's "...a tense and satisfying thriller. The Last Victim is a film that marks its makers as talents to keep an eye on". Josh Taylor of Nightmarish Conjurings was among the first to review the film, saying "I saw this film as a throwback to classic noir, mixed with the writing styles of the Coen Brothers and Quentin Tarantino. If that sounds like high praise, that's because it actually is."

Brian Fanelli of HorrorBuzz.com called the film "a thrilling neo-western", giving it a "7/10". Alex Saveliev of Film Threat also gave the film a "7/10", saying that it "…explores what it is that makes us human and separates us from other species...". Joel Copling of Spectrum Culture rated the film at "70%", saying "If the plot sounds familiar, it's more of an homage to the Coen Brothers than a rip-off'".

Jeffery M. Anderson of Common Sense Media and noted Canadian film critic Richard Crouse both gave the film moderately positive "3/5" ratings, with Anderson saying it's "A neo-Western with a bit of a bite" that "gives its fascinating characters -- and, amazingly, the audience -- credit for being smart enough to follow its twisty checkerboard jumps" while Richard Crouse called it "a very strong directorial debut that packs excitement into the storytelling, including a rather surreal climax, with enough twists to keep the story of survival compelling throughout."

Negative reviews of the film include Joe Leydon of Variety, who called it "the latest in a seemingly endless line of neo-noir thrillers with a neo-western gloss". and Derek Smith of Slant Magazine, who gave the film "2 out of 4 stars", saying it was "distractingly indebted to No Country for Old Men". Tim Cogshell of FilmWeek also gave The Last Victim a moderately negative review, saying, "This is a film with a lot of good performances that gets off to a really good start... It loses the thread in the third act. I was really disappointed."

One noted fan of the film is best-selling author Stephen King, who recommended The Last Victim in a Tweet on September 24 of 2022, saying "Looking for a bloodthirsty little thriller? How about THE LAST VICTIM (Hulu)? Ron Perlamn [sic] doesn't have a lot to do, but Ali Larter is in overdrive. Like a combination of Joe Pickett and Cormac McCarthy."

In addition, acclaimed comic book writer and author Chuck Dixon called the film an “intelligently composed little thriller that benefits from a solid script and excellent, restrained performances from its cast”. In a Facebook post recommending the film on July 29th, 2026.
