= Brett Gelman =

American actor and comedian (born 1976)

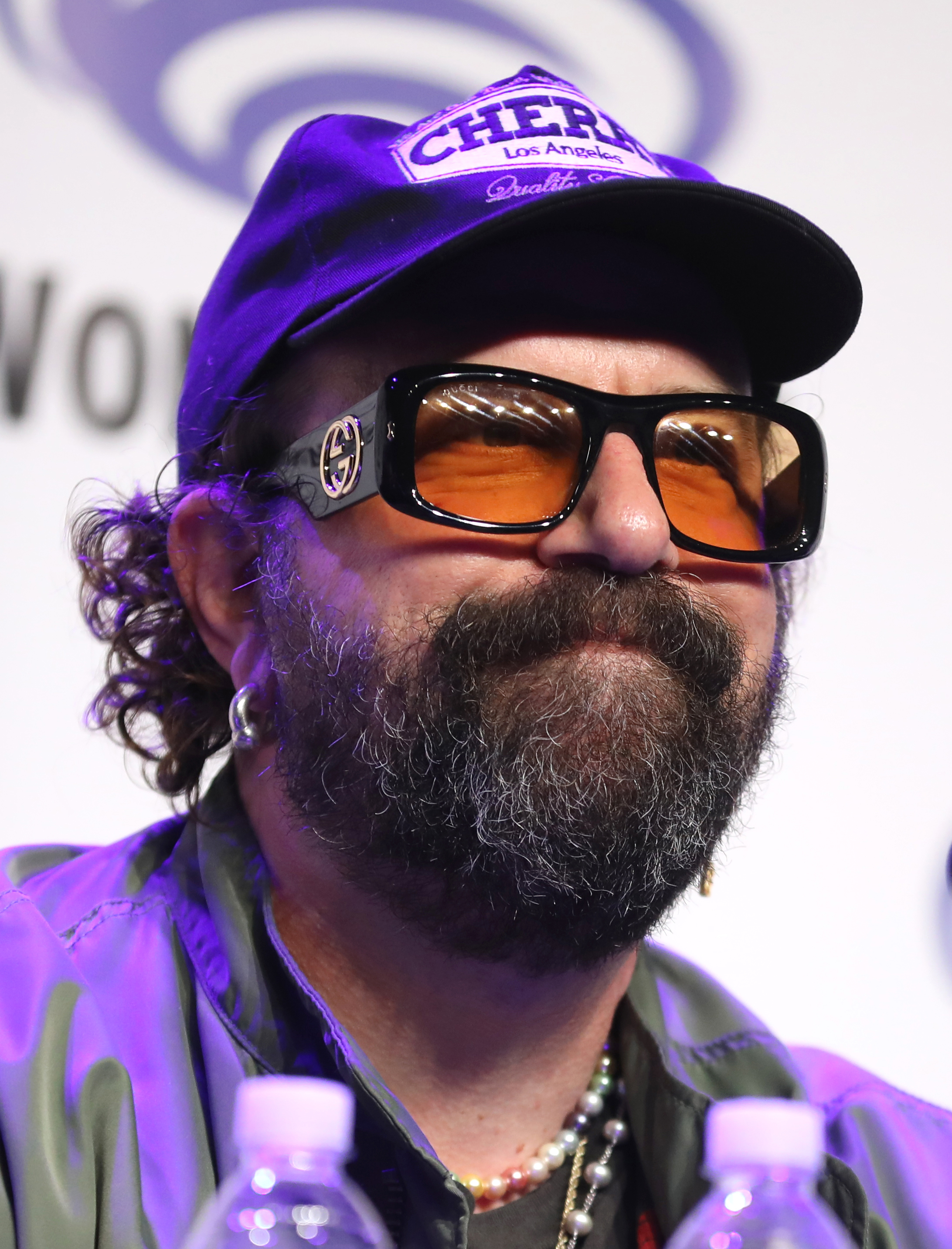
- Gelman at the 2024 WonderCon
- Born: October 6, 1976 (age 50)
- Education: University of North Carolina School of the Arts (BFA)
- Occupations: Actor; comedian; producer; writer
- Years active: 2004–present
- Spouses: Janicza Bravo (m. 2015; div. 2018) Ari Dayan (m. 2025)

Brett Gelman (born October 6, 1976) is an American actor and comedian. He is best known for his role as Murray Bauman in Netflix's horror-supernatural series Stranger Things and as Martin in the BBC comedy Fleabag.

Gelman began his career as a comedian in the 2000s, gaining notability the following decade for his involvement in numerous Adult Swim shows, notably Eagleheart and comedy specials in 2014 and 2015. During this time, he also was part of the main casts of the NBC sitcom Go On, the Comedy Central series Another Period, and the FX comedy series Married.

Gelman became prominent in the late 2010s for his supporting roles in Fleabag and Stranger Things, in addition to those on Camping and Mr. Mercedes. He starred in the Apple TV+ drama series Lady in the Lake. As a voice actor, he has contributed to television series Jeff & Some Aliens and TripTank on Comedy Central and, more recently, I Heart Arlo and Inside Job on Netflix, among others. As well as for the films such as Arlo the Alligator Boy (2021) and Hexed (upcoming 2026)

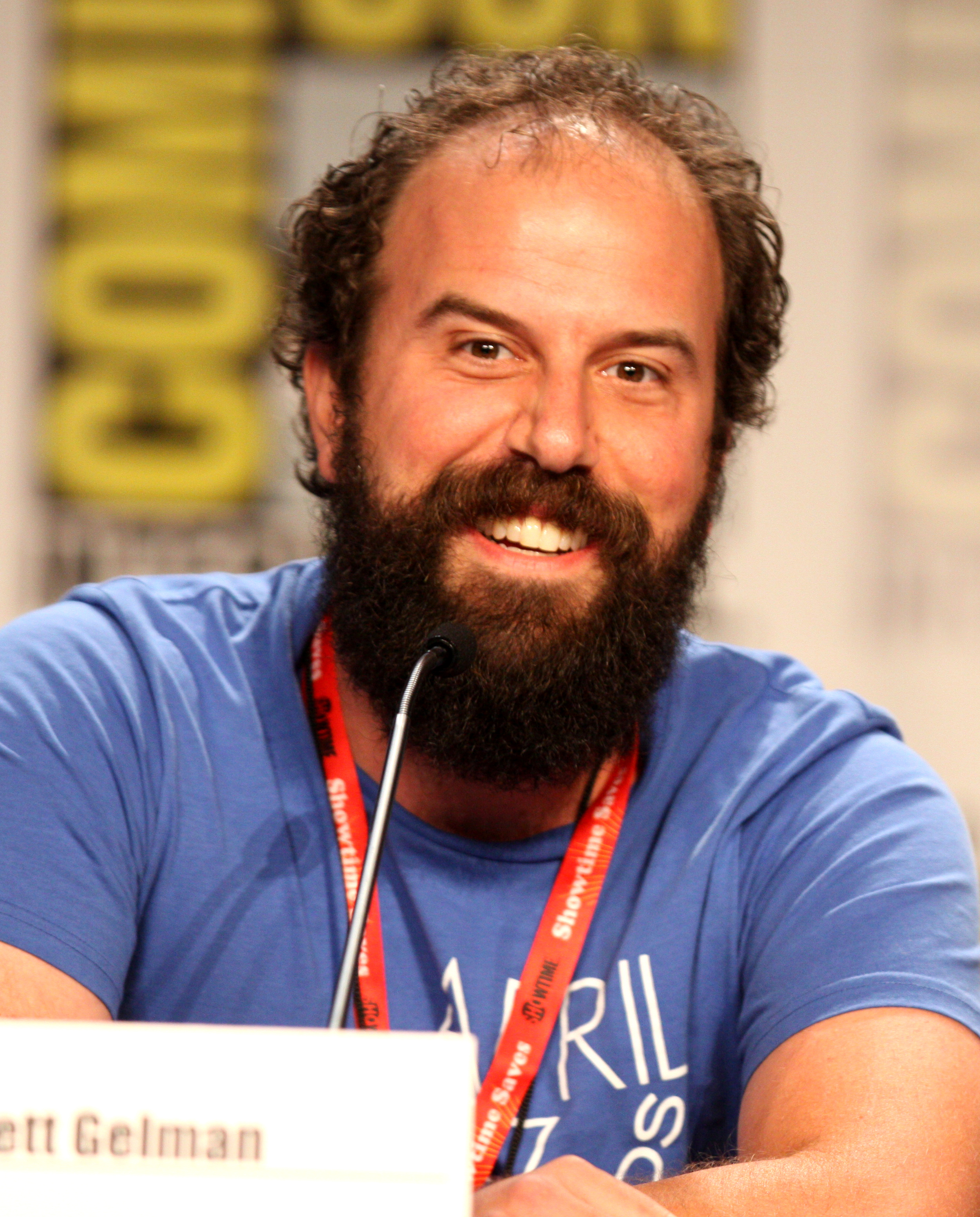
Gelman at the 2011 San Diego Comic-Con

== Early life ==
Gelman's father was a photo salesman. He was raised Jewish and has a younger sister who is a speech pathologist.

Gelman graduated from Highland Park High School in Illinois. He graduated from the University of North Carolina School of the Arts, where he received classical training in theater.

== Career ==
After college, Gelman moved to New York City with a fellow schoolmate, actor Jon Daly. While in New York, Gelman was a regular performer at the Upright Citizens Brigade Theatre, as part of the duo Cracked Out and sketch group Mr. A$$.

A popular New York Lottery commercial funded his work for a while. Gelman did a one-man show called 1,000 Cats, which he workshopped at many venues.

Gelman has appeared in the films The Other Guys and 30 Minutes or Less. He has co-starred as Chris Elliott's sidekick Brett Mobley in the live-action Adult Swim series Eagleheart and is a regular sketch performer on HBO's Funny or Die Presents and Comedy Central's Nick Swardson's Pretend Time. He has had recurring roles on The Life & Times of Tim and The Inbetweeners, as well as making guest appearances on comedy programs such as Bored to Death, Curb Your Enthusiasm, The Office, Happy Endings, Aqua Teen Hunger Force, and The League. Gelman has also written for the MTV sketch series Human Giant and the Scott Aukerman & B. J. Porter created sketch pilot The Right Now! Show.

In 2010, Gelman appeared as a cast member on the Comedy Central sketch comedy special This Show Will Get You High, created by Matt Besser. Gelman co-starred as "Mr. K" on the NBC comedy series Go On starring Matthew Perry, and as A.J. on the FX comedy series Married.

In 2014, Gelman hosted a dinner party special, called Dinner with Friends with Brett Gelman and Friends, which aired on Adult Swim.

In 2015, Gelman was also a consulting writer on season two of the entertainment news parody series Hot Package on Adult Swim and also recurs as Hamish on the Comedy Central series Another Period and as Ronnie on the Starz series Blunt Talk. Also in 2015, Gelman appeared in the series finale of Mad Men.

In July 2016, Gelman starred in the special Dinner in America with Brett Gelman, a sequel to Dinner with Friends with Brett Gelman and Friends, which focused on racism. In November 2016, Gelman said that he had left Cartoon Network and Adult Swim due to the network's alleged poor treatment of female employees and the promotion of the controversial Million Dollar Extreme Presents: World Peace.

In 2017, Gelman starred in and co-wrote Lemon, opposite Judy Greer, Michael Cera, Nia Long and Gillian Jacobs, directed by Janicza Bravo. It had its world premiere at the Sundance Film Festival on January 22, 2017.

In 2016, it was announced that Gelman was cast in the second season of the hit Netflix science-fiction web series Stranger Things as Murray Bauman, a conspiracy theorist and former journalist. He was promoted to the main cast for the fourth season.

In 2018, he starred in the independent feature film Room for Rent, opposite Mark Little, Carla Gallo, Stephnie Weir, Patrick J. Adams, and Mark McKinney. Gunpowder & Sky released the film in the US on all major VOD platforms November 2, 2018.

In 2022, it was announced that Gelman was starring in the Apple TV+ drama series Lady in the Lake, based on Laura Lippman's novel of the same name.

Gelman was cast for the movie McVeigh in 2024, where he played the role of Terry Nichols. In an interview with Karen Butler of United Press International, Gelman said that he had to work hard to "get into the head of this (Nichols's) very reprehensible, very problematic guy."

=== Other work ===
Gelman and frequent writing partner and collaborator Jon Daly performed for many years as the comedy rap duo "Cracked Out". Gelman has gained recognition for appearing as the "Little Bit Of Luck" character in the "Take 5" New York Lottery ad campaign that ran from 2008 through 2011. Gelman has said that the inspiration for the character is rocker Guthrie Govan.

Gelman made frequent appearances on the Comedy Bang! Bang! podcast, as well as other podcasts on the Earwolf podcasting network. In 2011, he began his own podcast, Gelmania, also available on the Earwolf network. Gelman has said he wanted his podcast to "reflect a lot of the fears and anger and sadness of the world, but do that through a really stupid lens." In 2014, Gelmania began its second season but is no longer on the Earwolf network.

== Personal life ==
In December 2015, Gelman married Janicza Bravo. The pair met in New York City while working on a New York Lotto commercial. They divorced in 2018. Gelman announced his engagement to actress and model Ari Dayan via Instagram in April 2023.

Gelman has been a vocal supporter of Israel on Instagram throughout the Gaza war. In November 2023, Gelman was among more than a dozen creators and celebrities who confronted TikTok executives in a public letter claiming that the app is directly amplifying the spread of antisemitism. TikTok pushed back against claims that it was promoting pro-Palestine, anti-Israel content through its feeds, stating instead that while the platform regularly moderates antisemitic, Anti-Arab racist, and Islamophobic content, it does not moderate nor amplify the spread of content expressing criticism of the Israeli government. He appeared on the Israeli sketch-comedy program Eretz Nehederet later that year, "skewering the anti-Israel sentiment in the American left and especially on campus," as described in the Times of Israel.

== Filmography ==
=== Film ===
Key
†	Denotes films that have not yet been released

Year	Title	Role	Notes
2004	Blackballed: The Bobby Dukes Story	Mayhem Team Member	
2006	Gingerbreed	Driller Driver	
2007	Watching the Detectives	Glenn	
2008	Stick It in Detroit	Hot Rod Johnson	
2009	May the Best Man Win	Bachelor Party Host	
2010	The Other Guys	Hal	
2011	Eat	August	Short
2011	30 Minutes or Less	Pizza Boss	
2011	A Very Harold & Kumar 3D Christmas	TV Director	
2013	Jobs	Jef Raskin	
2013	Awful Nice	Ivan	
2013	Gregory Go Boom	Tom	Short, also producer
2014	Someone Marry Barry	Goker	
2016	Joshy	Greg	
2016	Flock of Dudes	Howie	
2017	Lemon	Isaac Lachmann	Also writer
2017	Wilson	Robert	
2017	DRIB	Brady Thompson	
2017	The Disaster Artist	Acting Teacher	
2017	Room for Rent	Carl Lemay	
2018	Wild Nights with Emily	Higginson	
2018	Like Father	Frank Lerue	
2019	Jezebel	Bobby	Voice
2019	Harpoon	Narrator	
2020	Have a Good Trip: Adventures in Psychedelics	Himself	
2021	Arlo the Alligator Boy	Marcellus	Voice
2021	Without Remorse	Victor Rykov	
2022	Metal Lords	Dr. Sylvester	
2022	Lyle, Lyle, Crocodile	Mr. Grumps	
2023	Surrounded	Mr. Fields	
2023	Strays	Willy	
2023	Boy Kills World	Gideon van der Koy	
2024	McVeigh	Terry Nichols	
2025	Haunted Heist	TBA	
2026	Hexed †	TBA	Voice
TBA	Mini War †	Ned Parker	Post-production
TBA	Syndetic †	Dr. Carnegie	Post-production

=== Television ===
Year	Title	Role	Notes
2005	Coke	Gonzales	TV short
2005	The Colbert Report	Spencer	Episode: "Greg Behrendt"
2007	Fat Guy Stuck in Internet	Co-Worker, Linux, The Oracle	3 episodes
2007	Honesty	Mechanic	Episode: "Mechanic"
2008	Human Giant	Kidnapped Soldier, Rapzilla, Billy Crystal	2 episodes
2009	Californication	Annoying Hipster	Episode: "Mia Culpa"
2010	Comedy Lab	Ruby	Voice, episode: "Penelope Princess of Pets"
2010	This Show Will Get You High	Cast Member	Comedy Central pilot
2010	Nick Swardson's Pretend Time	Various	Episode: "Mudslide Junction"
2010–2011	Funny or Die Presents	Nick, Performer	3 episodes
2010–2011	The Back Room	Mr. America, James Gandolfini	4 episodes
2010–2012	The Life & Times of Tim	Co-Worker, Walker Fan, Adam's Friend, Doug the Intruder	Voice, 4 episodes
2011	Happy Endings	Carl	Episode: "Your Couples Friends & Neighbors"
2011	Curb Your Enthusiasm	Pig Parker	Episode: "Vow of Silence"
2011	Bored to Death	Faux Jonathan	Episode: "We Could Sing a Duet"
2011–2013	The League	Gavin	2 episodes
2011–2014	Eagleheart	Brett Mobley	Series regular; 26 episodes
2012	The Office	The Magician	Episode: "Welcome Party"
2012	The Inbetweeners	Mr Gilbert	Recurring; 7 episodes
2012	Aqua Teen Hunger Force	Rocket Horse	Voice, episode: "Rocket Horse & Jet Chicken"
2012–2013	Go On	Mr. K	Series regular; 22 episodes
2012–2015	Comedy Bang! Bang!	Dog Lawyer, Mr. Celebrity	2 episodes
2013	Ghost Ghirls	Rabbit	Episode: "I Believe in Mira-ghouls"
2013	NTSF:SD:SUV::	Gabby Hofstein	Episode: "Unfrozen Agent Man"
2013	We Are Men	Alimony Steve	Episode: "We Are Franksgiving"
2013–2014	Drunk History	Various	2 episodes
2013–2015	Kroll Show	Various	3 episodes
2014	Surviving Jack	Principal McMullen	Episode: "Rhythm Is a Dancer"
2014	Adventure Time	Ring Master	Voice, episode: "Sad Face"
2014	Bad Teacher	Doug Pilaf	5 episodes
2014	Dinner with Friends with Brett Gelman and Friends	Himself	Special
2014–2015	Married	A.J.	Series regular; 23 episodes
2014–2016	Mr. Pickles	Cheeseman	Voice, 2 episodes
2014–2016	TripTank	Jeff	Voice, 9 episodes
2015	Dinner with Family with Brett Gelman and Brett Gelman's Family	Himself	Special
2015	Fresh Off the Boat	Dusty Nugget	Episode: "Persistent Romeo"
2015	Man Seeking Woman	Demon	Episode: "Stain"
2015	The Odd Couple	Stuart	Episode: "Jealous Island"
2015	Mad Men	Daniel	Episode: "Person to Person"
2015–2016	Blunt Talk	Ronnie	6 episodes
2015–2018	Another Period	Hamish Crassus	Recurring; 20 episodes
2016	Angel from Hell	Lee	2 episodes
2016	Clarence	Mr. Mozer	Voice, episode: "Field Trippin'"
2016	Dinner in America with Brett Gelman	Himself	Special
2016	High Maintenance	Himself	Episode: "Selfie"
2016–2018	Love	Dr. Greg Colter	Recurring; 10 episodes
2016–2020	American Dad!	Various voices	6 episodes
2016–2019	Fleabag	Martin	Series regular; 7 episodes
2017	Jeff & Some Aliens	Jeff	Voice, main role (10 episodes)
2017	Making History	Paul Revere	2 episodes
2017	Budding Prospects	Vogelsein	Pilot
2017	Twin Peaks	Supervisor Burns	2 episodes
2017–2025	Stranger Things	Murray Bauman	Recurring (seasons 2–3); Main (season 4–5)
2018	Camping	George	Main role; 8 episodes
2019	Mr. Mercedes	Rolan Finklestein	Recurring role; 9 episodes
2020	Family Guy	Escape Room Guy	Voice, episode: "Baby Stewie"
2020	The Mighty Ones	Egg	Voice, episode: "Egg Nag"
2021	I Heart Arlo	Marcellus	Voice, 18 episodes
2021–2022	Inside Job	Magic Myc	Voice, 18 episodes
2023	Eretz Nehederet	Wise man from Berkeley	Christmas special sketch
2023	Entitled	Gabe Stark	Main role, 8 episodes
2024	Lady in the Lake	Milton	Main role, 7 episodes
2024	Hamster and Gretel	Felix	Voice, episode: "Who's in Charge?"
2027	Wild Things †	Bernie Yuman	Upcoming miniseries

=== Music Video ===
Year	Title	Role	Notes
2011 Another Like You - Hayes Carll
