= Terry Nichols =

American domestic terrorist (born 1955)

- Mug shot of Nichols
- Born: Terry Lynn Nichols; April 1, 1955 (age 71); Lapeer, Michigan, U.S.
- Other names: Ted Parker, Joe Rivers, Shawn Rivers, Joe Havens, Terry Havens, Mike Havens, Joe Kyle, Daryl Bridges
- Occupation: U.S. Army soldier • farmer • real estate salesman
- Known for: Co-conspirator in the Oklahoma City bombing
- Spouse(s): Lana Walsh (divorced); Marife Torres (divorced)
- Children: 3
- Status: Incarcerated at Supermax
- Motive: Anti-government sentiment; Retaliation for Ruby Ridge, Waco siege and other government raids, U.S. foreign policy, Federal Assault Weapons Ban and civilian casualties from U.S. military attacks in foreign countries
- Convictions: Federal; Involuntary manslaughter of a federal employee (18 U.S.C. §§ 1112 and 1114) (8 counts); Conspiracy to use a weapon of mass destruction resulting in death (18 U.S.C. § 2332a); Oklahoma; First degree murder (161 counts); First degree arson Conspiracy
- Penalty: Federal; Life imprisonment without the possibility of parole plus eight 6-year concurrent sentences plus $14,500,000 in restitution plus $450 special assessments Oklahoma; 161 consecutive life sentences without the possibility of parole plus 45 years consecutively plus $5,000,000 in restitution plus $1,660,000 in fines
- Accomplices: Timothy McVeigh; Michael Fortier

Details
- Killed: 168–169: 167–168 direct; 1 indirect
- Injured: 684
- Weapons: Ammonium nitrate and nitromethane truck bomb
- Military career
- Branch: U.S. Army
- Service year: 1988–1989
- Rank: Private First Class

Terry Lynn Nichols (born April 1, 1955) is an American mass murderer and domestic terrorist who was convicted for conspiring with Timothy McVeigh in the 1995 Oklahoma City bombing plot. The bombing is the deadliest act of domestic terrorism in U.S. history.

Nichols was born in Lapeer, Michigan. He held a variety of short-term jobs, working as a farmer, grain elevator manager, real estate salesman, and ranch hand. Nichols met Timothy McVeigh during a brief stint in the U.S. Army, which ended in 1989 when he requested a hardship discharge after less than one year of service. In 1994 and 1995, Nichols conspired with McVeigh in the planning and preparation of the truck bombing of the Alfred P. Murrah Federal Building in Oklahoma City, Oklahoma, on April 19, 1995. The bombing killed 168 people.

In a federal trial in 1997, Nichols was convicted of conspiracy to use a weapon of mass destruction and eight counts of involuntary manslaughter for killing federal law enforcement personnel. He was sentenced to life imprisonment without the possibility of parole after the jury deadlocked on the death penalty. Nichols was also tried in Oklahoma on state charges of murder in connection with the bombing. In 2004, he was convicted of 161 counts of first degree murder, including one count of fetal homicide, first-degree arson, and conspiracy.

As in the federal trial, the state jury deadlocked on imposing the death penalty. In the longest prison sentence ever given to an individual, Nichols was sentenced to 161 consecutive life terms without the possibility of parole, and is incarcerated at ADX Florence, a super maximum security prison near Florence, Colorado. He shared a cell block that is commonly referred to as "Bomber's Row" with Ramzi Yousef and Eric Rudolph, as well as Ted Kaczynski until being transferred in 2021.

== Early life ==
Nichols was born on April 1, 1955, in Lapeer, Michigan. He was raised on a farm, and was the third of four children of Joyce and Robert Nichols. Growing up, he helped his parents on the farm, learning to operate and maintain the equipment. According to the Denver Post, Nichols also cared for injured birds and animals.

== Adulthood ==
Nichols attended Lapeer High School where he took elective classes in crafts and business law. Throughout school, friends characterized Nichols as shy. In high school, he played junior varsity football, wrestled, and was a member of the ski club. Nichols' brother, James, who self-published a 400-page book about the bombing, stated that Terry was book smart and good at artwork. Nichols graduated from high school in 1973 with a 3.6 grade point average, with ambitions of becoming a physician.

Nichols enrolled at Central Michigan University. He completed one term of 13 credit hours with B grade average. He had Cs in biology, chemistry and trigonometry, a B in literature and an A in archery. In 1974, after another brother, Leslie, was badly burned in a fuel tank explosion on the farm, Nichols offered to give him skin for grafts. Nichols tried farming with his brother James for a while, but they did not get along as he felt his brother was too bossy. Later, Nichols moved to Colorado and obtained a license to sell real estate in 1976. Soon after he closed on his first big sale, Nichols' mother told him that she needed his help on the farm, so Nichols returned to Michigan.

In 1980, Nichols met real estate agent Lana Walsh, a twice-divorced mother of two who was five years his senior. They married and had a son in 1982. During the marriage, Nichols engaged in a succession of part-time and short-term jobs: carpentry work, managing a grain elevator, and selling life insurance and real estate. According to Lana, she was the one with a career; Nichols was a househusband, who spent most of his time at home with the children cooking and gardening.

Nichols had never liked farm life, and in 1988, at the age of 33, he tried to escape it by enlisting in the United States Army. Nichols was sent to Fort Benning next to Columbus, Georgia for basic training. As the oldest man in his platoon, Nichols had difficulty with the physical aspect of the training, and was sometimes called "Grandpa" by the other men. However, he was soon made the platoon guide because of his age. Timothy McVeigh was in his platoon, and they quickly became close friends. They had a common background: both men grew up in white rural areas, both had tried college for a while, and both had parents who were divorced. They also shared political views and interests in gun collecting and the survivalist movement. The two were later stationed together at Fort Riley in Junction City, Kansas, where they met and became friends with their future accomplice, Michael Fortier.

Nichols' wife filed for divorce soon after he joined the Army. Due to a conflict over childcare, Nichols requested and was given a hardship discharge in May 1989 to return home to take care of his son, who was seven years old at the time. As Nichols departed, he told a fellow soldier that he would be starting his own military organization soon, and would have an unlimited supply of weapons.

In 1990, Nichols, 35, married 17-year-old Marife Torres from the Philippines, whom he met through a mail-order bride agency. When she arrived in Michigan several months later, she was pregnant with another man's child. The child died at age two when he suffocated after getting tangled up with a plastic bag from a banana box that was left overnight in his bedroom. Marife initially suspected foul play from either Nichols or McVeigh, but there were no bruises or signs of trauma to the child. The death was ruled accidental. Nichols and Marife had two more children during their marriage. Nichols and Torres frequently visited the Philippines, where she was attending a local college working on a degree in physical therapy. He sometimes traveled to the Philippines alone, while she remained in Kansas.

Nichols left a cryptic note and a package of documents with his ex-wife, Lana (Walsh) Padilla, prior to one of his many visits to the Philippines. Upon returning from the visit to learn that she had prematurely opened a letter instructing her what to do in the event of his death, Nichols made a series of telephone calls to a Cebu City boarding house. He and Torres divorced after his arrest, and she returned to the Philippines with the children.

== Anti-government views ==
Nichols' anti-government views developed and grew over the years. He spent most of his adult life in the Lapeer and Sanilac County areas of Michigan where mistrust and resentment of the federal government is common, especially after bank foreclosures of many farms during the 1980s farm crisis. Torres, Nichols' ex-wife, also helped foster his anti-government views as some Filipinos, especially Filipino Americans, held anti-government views due to their history with colonialism. Neighbors said that Nichols attended meetings of anti-government groups, experimented with explosives and got more radical as time went on.

Nichols began to adhere to sovereign citizen ideology. In February 1992, he attempted to renounce his US citizenship by writing to the local county clerk in Michigan, stating that the political system was corrupt, and declaring himself a "non resident alien". Several months later, Nichols appeared in court and tried to avoid responsibility for some of his credit card bills (he owed approximately $40,000 altogether), refusing to come before the bench, and shouting at the judge that the government had no jurisdiction over him. On October 19, 1992, Nichols signed another document renouncing his US citizenship. In May 1993, Nichols appeared before a county judge regarding an $8,421 unpaid credit card debt. Nichols also renounced his driver’s license.

McVeigh and Nichols grew closer after McVeigh's discharge from the Army. In December 1991, Nichols invited McVeigh to join him in Michigan and help him out selling military surplus at gun shows. For the next three years, McVeigh stayed with Nichols off and on. On April 19, 1993, Nichols was watching TV with McVeigh at the Nichols' farmhouse in Michigan during the siege of the Branch Davidian compound in Waco, Texas. When the compound went up in flames, McVeigh and Nichols were enraged and began to plot revenge on the federal government. During the fall of 1993, Nichols and McVeigh, who were living at the farm, became business partners, selling weapons and military surplus at gun shows. For a while, they lived an itinerant life, following the gun shows from town to town.

Nichols then went to Las Vegas to try working in construction but failed. Next, he went to central Kansas and was hired in March 1994 as a ranch hand in Marion, Kansas. That same month, Nichols sent a letter to the clerk of Marion County, Kansas, saying that he was not subject to the laws of the U.S. government and asked his employer not to withhold any federal taxes from his check. The employer said that Nichols was hard-working but had unusual political views. During the fall of 1994, Nichols quit his job, telling his employer he was going into business with McVeigh.

== The bombing ==
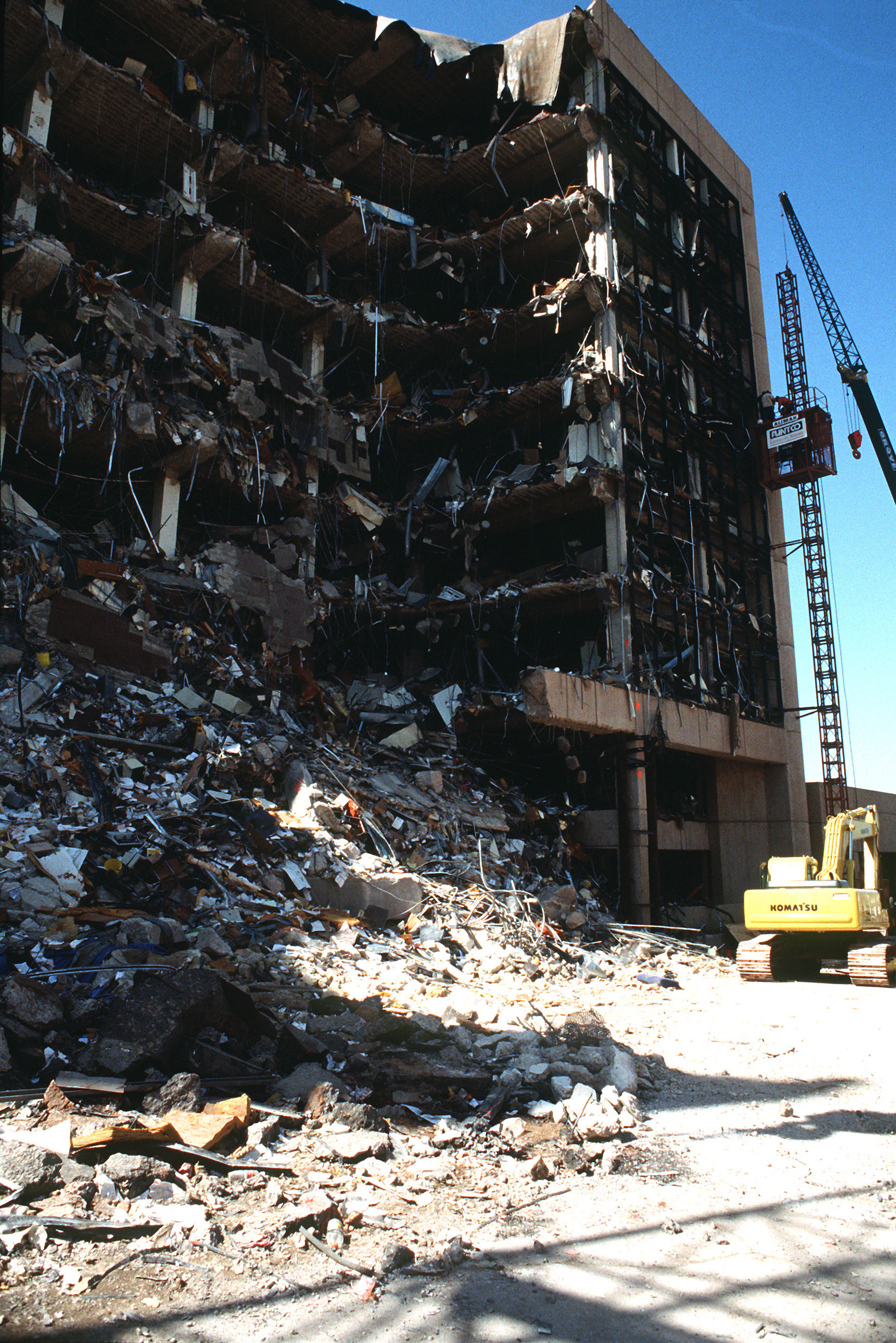
The bombing site on April 21, 1995

On September 22, 1994, Nichols and McVeigh rented a storage shed and began gathering supplies for the truck bomb. In late September or early October, they stole dynamite and blasting caps from a nearby quarry. Nichols began purchasing large quantities of ammonium nitrate fertilizer and storing it in three rental storage units. He also robbed an Arkansas gun dealer who had befriended him and McVeigh at various gun shows. The men were heavily influenced by the techniques used in the 1993 World Trade Center bombing which involved similar bombs.

In February 1995, Nichols bought a small house in Herington, Kansas, with a cash down payment. The following month, he bought diesel fuel. On April 14, Good Friday, Nichols gave McVeigh some cash, according to McVeigh. Two days later, on Easter Sunday, Nichols and McVeigh drove to Oklahoma City to drop off the getaway car. On April 18, the day before the bombing, Nichols helped McVeigh prepare the truck bomb at a lake near Herington. McVeigh remarked about Nichols's and Fortier's partial withdrawal from the plot, saying they "were men who liked to talk tough, but in the end their bitches and kids ruled." Nichols was at home in Kansas with his family when the bomb went off.

On April 21, 1995, Nichols learned he was wanted for questioning, turned himself in, and consented to a search of his home. The search turned up blasting caps, detonating cords, ground ammonium nitrate, barrels made of plastic similar to fragments found at the bombing site, 33 firearms, anti-government warfare literature, a receipt for ammonium nitrate fertilizer with McVeigh's fingerprints on it, a telephone credit card that McVeigh had used when he was shopping for bomb-making equipment, and a hand-drawn map of downtown Oklahoma City. Nichols was held as a material witness to the bombing until he was charged on May 10.

Investigators also combed the Decker, Michigan, farm of James Nichols where Terry Nichols and McVeigh had stayed intermittently in the months preceding the bombing. James was held in custody on charges that he made small bombs on the farm but was released without charges on May 24, with the judge saying there was no evidence that he was a danger to others.

== Prosecutions ==
=== Federal case ===
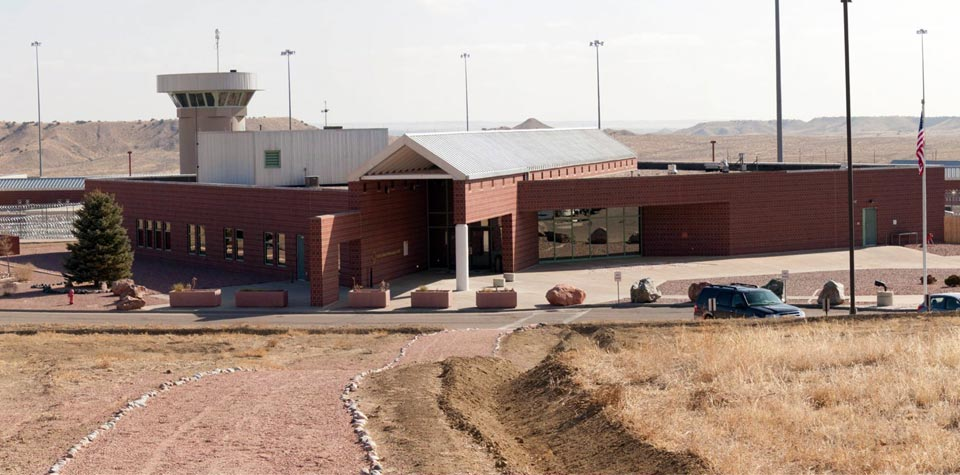
Florence ADMAX USP, the supermax security prison where Nichols resides

McVeigh was tried before Nichols and sentenced to death. Former army soldier and friend of Nichols, Michael Fortier, testified against both McVeigh and Nichols. Fortier had entered into a federal plea agreement for reduced charges in return for his agreement to testify. He was charged with failing to notify authorities in advance of the crime and sentenced to 12 years in prison. Fortier testified that Nichols and McVeigh had expressed anti-government feelings and conspired to blow up the Murrah federal building. He said he helped McVeigh survey the building before the attack. He also testified that Nichols had robbed an Arkansas gun dealer to finance the cost of the bombing. Fortier provided "solid bricks of evidence" for the cases against McVeigh and Nichols, according to the prosecutor.

Nichols' ex-wife, Marife Torres, testified as a defense witness, but her story may have helped the prosecution's case. She said that her husband had been living a double life prior to the bombing, using aliases, renting storage lockers, and lying that he had broken off his relationship with McVeigh. Torres also testified that Nichols traveled to Oklahoma City three days before the bombing, supporting the prosecution's contention that Nichols helped McVeigh station a getaway car near the Murrah building. Torres also failed to give Nichols an alibi for April 18, 1995, the day the prosecution said that Nichols helped McVeigh assemble the truck bomb.

Nichols was represented by criminal defense attorney Michael Tigar. The trial lasted nine weeks with the prosecution calling 100 witnesses tying Nichols to McVeigh and the bombing plot. The prosecution argued that Nichols helped McVeigh purchase and steal bomb ingredients, park the getaway car near the Murrah building and assemble the bomb. The defense attempted to cast doubt on the case against Nichols by calling witnesses who said they saw other men with McVeigh before the bombing and by claiming the government had manipulated the evidence against Nichols.

The jury deliberated for 41 hours over a period of six days, acquitting Nichols on December 24, 1997, of actually detonating the bomb, but convicting him of conspiring with McVeigh to use a weapon of mass destruction, a capital offense. They acquitted Nichols on the charges of first degree (premeditated) murder, but convicted him on the lesser charge of involuntary (unintentional) manslaughter in the deaths of the federal law enforcement officers.

In assessing why Nichols was not convicted of first degree murder, The Washington Post noted:

There was no evidence that Nichols had rented the Ryder truck used to carry the bomb to Oklahoma City, and there was no one who could positively identify him as the purchaser of the two tons of ammonium nitrate, the major component in the bomb. Most problematic for the government was the compelling fact that Nichols was at home in Kansas when McVeigh detonated the truck.

Another theory is that some members of the jury believed Nichols' attorneys' arguments that he had withdrawn from the conspiracy before the bombing. His apparent remorse as shown by his crying several times during the testimony could also have swayed the jury.

After the penalty hearing concluded, the jury deliberated for 13 hours over two days on whether to give Nichols a death sentence, but deadlocked. U.S. District Court Judge Richard P. Matsch then had the option of giving Nichols a sentence of life imprisonment or a lesser term. On June 4, 1998, he sentenced Nichols to life in prison without parole on the conspiracy conviction, calling Nichols "an enemy of the Constitution" who had conspired to destroy everything the Constitution protects. Nichols also received a concurrent 48-year sentence for his eight involuntary manslaughter convictions, six for each victim. Nichols showed no emotion. He was sent to the Federal Supermax Prison in Florence, Colorado. On February 26, 1999, a federal appeals court affirmed Nichols' conviction and sentence.

=== Oklahoma state case ===
After the federal jury deadlocked on the death penalty, which resulted in a life sentence, citizens of Oklahoma petitioned to empanel a state court grand jury to investigate the bombing. State representative Charles Key led a citizens group that circulated the petitions. It was hoped that evidence implicating other conspirators would be uncovered. A grand jury heard testimony for 18 months about allegations of other accomplices but returned only the indictments against Nichols in March 1999. Oklahoma County District Attorney Wes Lane denied the state prosecution was conducted solely for the purpose of having Nichols executed, saying it was important Nichols be convicted of killing all the victims. "This case has always been about 161 men, women and children and an unborn baby having the same rights to their day in court as eight federal law enforcement officers", Lane said.

Nichols was brought from the prison in Colorado to Oklahoma in January 2000 to face the state trial on 160 capital counts of first-degree murder and one count each of fetal homicide, first-degree arson, and conspiracy. The prosecutor's goal was to get the death penalty.

During the two-month trial, the prosecution presented a "mountain of circumstantial evidence," calling 151 witnesses. Their star witness was Fortier, who said Nichols was intimately involved in the conspiracy and had helped obtain bomb ingredients, including fertilizer that was mixed with high-octane fuel. Fortier also testified that McVeigh and Nichols stole cord and blasting caps from a rock quarry, and that Nichols robbed Roger E. Moore, a gun collector, to obtain money for the plot. Nichols' lawyers said he was the "fall guy" and that others, Moore included, had conspired with McVeigh. They wanted to introduce evidence that a group of white supremacists had been McVeigh's accomplices. However, the judge did not allow them to do so, saying that the defense had not shown that any of these people committed acts in furtherance of the conspiracy. In their concluding argument, the defense said, "People who are still unknown assisted Timothy McVeigh." On May 26, 2004, the six-man, six-woman jury took five hours to reach guilty verdicts on all charges. When the verdict was read, Nichols showed no emotion, staring straight ahead.

The penalty phase of the trial started on June 1, 2004. The same jury that determined Nichols' guilt would also determine whether he would be put to death. During the five-day hearing, 87 witnesses were called, including victims and family members of Nichols. Nichols' relatives testified that he was a loving family man. During the closing arguments, the prosecutor argued for the death penalty, stating that 168 people had died so that Nichols and McVeigh "could make a political statement". The defense argued that Nichols had been controlled by a "dominant, manipulative" McVeigh and urged jurors not to be persuaded by the "flood of tears" of the victims who testified. The defense also said that Nichols had "sincerely" converted to Christianity. After 19½ hours of deliberation over three days, the jury could not reach a unanimous decision on the death penalty. With the death penalty no longer an option, Nichols spoke publicly for the first time in the proceedings, making a lengthy statement laced with religious references to Judge Steven W. Taylor. Nichols also apologized for the murders and offered to write to survivors to "assist in their healing process". Darlene Welch, whose niece was killed in the explosion, said she "didn't appreciate being preached to" by Nichols and that she regretted that "he won't stand before God sooner." Judge Taylor called Nichols a terrorist and said "No American citizen has ever brought this kind of devastation; you are in U.S. history the No. 1 mass murderer -- in all of U.S. history" and sentenced Nichols to 161 consecutive life terms without the possibility of parole. Nichols was returned to the federal prison in Colorado.

== Post-conviction ==
=== Additional explosives ===
Acting on a tip from reputed mobster Greg Scarpa Jr. (son of mobster Greg Scarpa Sr.), a fellow inmate of Nichols, the FBI searched the crawl space of Nichols' former home in Kansas ten years after the bombing. They found explosives in boxes, wrapped in plastic, buried under a foot of rock. The tipster had indicated that the explosives were buried before the attack.

=== Allegations by Nichols ===
McVeigh, Nichols, and Fortier were the only defendants indicted in the bombing. Nichols denied his involvement in the plot until 2004. Nichols' mother claimed that her son had Asperger syndrome, was manipulated by McVeigh, and did not know how the bomb would be used. In a May 2005 letter that he wrote to a relative of two of the victims, Nichols claimed that an Arkansas gun dealer also conspired in the 1995 bombing plot by donating some of the explosives that were used. In a 2006 letter requesting that a judge give his son a light sentence for assault with a deadly weapon, battery of a police officer, and possession of a stolen vehicle, Nichols admitted his participation in the Oklahoma City bombing but said that McVeigh had forced and intimidated him into cooperating.

In a 2007 affidavit, Nichols claimed that in 1992, McVeigh claimed to have been recruited for undercover missions while serving in the military. Nichols also said that in 1995, McVeigh told him that FBI official Larry Potts, who had supervised the Ruby Ridge and Waco operations, had directed McVeigh to blow up a government building. Nichols claimed that he and McVeigh had learned how to make the bomb from individuals they met while attending gun shows. In the same affidavit, Nichols admitted that he and McVeigh stole eight cases of the gel type explosive Tovex from a Marion, Kansas quarry, some of which was later used in the Oklahoma City truck bomb. Nichols, who had been employed in Marion County as a ranch hand, was familiar with numerous quarries there. He admitted that he had helped McVeigh mix the bomb ingredients in the truck the day before the attack, but he denied that he knew the exact target of the bomb. Nichols wanted to testify in more detail in a videotaped deposition, but a federal appeals court ruled against it in 2009.

== In media ==
Nichols was portrayed by actor Brett Gelman in the 2024 movie McVeigh. In an interview with Karen Butler of United Press International, Gelman said that he "worked hard" to "get into the head of this (Nichols's) very reprehensible, very problematic guy." He added that Nichols' actions were an important factor in the attack and said that, in his view, Nichols' validation for McVeigh meant that at times, he "wanted to be" like him.
