= Married (TV series) =

American TV comedy series

- Genre: Sitcom
- Created by: Andrew Gurland
- Starring: Judy Greer; Nat Faxon; Jenny Slate; Brett Gelman; Sarah Burns
- Composers: Jeff Cardoni (season 1); John Dragonetti (season 2)
- Country of origin: United States
- Original language: English
- No. of seasons: 2
- No. of episodes: 23

Production
- Executive producers: Andrew Gurland; Salamo Levin; Paul Young; Peter Principato
- Camera setup: Single-camera
- Running time: 20-28 minutes
- Production companies: Principato-Young Entertainment; Night Eater Productions; FX Productions

Original release
- Network: FX
- Release: July 17, 2014 – October 1, 2015

Married is an American sitcom created by Andrew Gurland, which aired on FX from July 17, 2014, to October 1, 2015. The series stars Judy Greer, Nat Faxon, Jenny Slate, and Brett Gelman. On September 30, 2014, FX renewed Married for a 13 episode second season which premiered on July 16, 2015. On October 26, 2015, FX cancelled the series after two seasons and 23 episodes.

== Premise ==
The series follows Russ and Lina Bowman, a long-time married couple who, when they are not fighting over debts, child rearing and their declining sex life, are reminded that their close friendship is what drew them together in the first place. Contrasting the Bowmans' lifestyle are their two close friends: A.J., a wealthy but unstable divorcé, and Jess, a free spirit who struggles to settle down after marrying an older man.

== Cast and characters ==
=== Main ===
- Judy Greer as Lina Bowman
- Nat Faxon as Russ Bowman
- Jenny Slate as Jess (season 1, series regular; season 2, recurring)
- Brett Gelman as A.J.
- Sarah Burns as Abby (season 2)

=== Recurring ===
- Raevan Lee Hanan as Ella Bowman
- Rachel Eggleston as Maya Bowman
- Skylar Gray as Frankie Bowman (seasons 1–2)
- Georgia May Geare as Frankie Bowman (season 2)
- John Hodgman as Bernie
- Paul Reiser as Shep
- Regina Hall as Roxanne
- Kimiko Glenn as Miranda (season 2)

== Production and development ==
On January 24, 2013, FX placed a pilot order under the working title of Untitled Andrew Gurland Project. The pilot was written and directed by Andrew Gurland. Gurland, Paul Young, and Peter Principato serve as executive producers, alongside FX Productions and Principato-Young Entertainment.

Casting announcements began in April 2013, with Nat Faxon cast in one of the lead roles as Russ Bowman, one half of the lead married couple. Judy Greer was the next actor cast in the role of Lina Bowman, the other half of the aforementioned couple, who is overwhelmed by her three young daughters and living in a new city with no friends. Jenny Slate and Brett Gelman were the last actors cast in the series, with Slate cast in the role of Jess, an ex-party girl who is now married to an older guy who struggles to keep up with her. Gelman signed on in the role of A.J., an intense, recently divorced guy who is pretending that he's over his ex.

On January 24, 2014, FX placed a series order under the title Married. Paul Reiser then joined the series in the recurring role of Shep, Jess's older husband. Shortly afterwards, Regina Hall was cast in the recurring role of Roxanne, A.J.'s ex-wife.

== Series overview ==
Season	Episodes	Originally released	
Season	Episodes	First released	Last released
1	10	July 17, 2014	September 18, 2014
2	13	July 16, 2015	October 1, 2015

== Episodes ==
=== Season 1 (2014) ===
No. overall	No. in season	Title	Directed by	Written by	Original release date	Prod. code	US viewers (millions)
1	1	"Pilot"	Andrew Gurland	Andrew Gurland	July 17, 2014	XMA01001	1.12
After Lina rejects sex with Russ for the umpteenth time, they quarrel and Lina gives him permission to have sex outside the marriage. Russ confides in his friends A.J. and Jess, who claim they can help, but he refuses to go the prostitute route. Russ is later hit on by a much younger woman, who makes it clear that sex is on the table, but love for (and perhaps fear of) Lina prevents Russ from going through with it.
2	2	"The Shower"	Jesse Peretz	Andrew Gurland & Salamo Levin	July 24, 2014	XMA01002	0.811
Russ wants to have shower sex at home, but Lina staunchly refuses because there isn't enough room to prevent them from getting cold. At a party that they later attend, Russ is using the bathroom and discovers a massive four-head shower. He then tries to convince Lina to jump in the shower right then and there. Frustrated, Russ ends up at a wild party with A.J., while Lina goes to a bar with Jess where they dance with younger men.
3	3	"The Getaway"	Jesse Peretz	Kevin Napier	July 31, 2014	XMA01003	0.538
Russ and Lina go on a romantic getaway to reconnect, but distractions get in the way of their romance. While there, they meet the young couple that is having loud sex in the room next to theirs. The woman is revealed to be the provider as her hunky boyfriend says he's saving for chef school. Russ convinces the young man to buy a classic car, getting him in trouble. Seeing the young couple quarreling turns on Lina, and she and Russ then have loud sex of their own. Elsewhere, the woman next door to Jess asks her to stop sexting her husband, and Shep makes things uncomfortable by grabbing Jess' phone and sexting the man, pretending to be her.
4	4	"Uncool"	Adam Davidson	Story by : Sam Sklaver and Andrew Gurland; Teleplay by : Sam Sklaver	August 7, 2014	XMA01004	0.634
An orthodontist fee forces Russ to confront Bernie for payment on a recent design, but Bernie in turn blames a college fraternity for failing to pay him. The two get some "muscle" to persuade the frat leader to pay up, and in the process of visiting the frat house realize how uncool they have become.
5	5	"The Playdate"	Jamie Babbit	Jennifer Joyce	August 14, 2014	XMA01005	0.595
After being told by a teacher that Maya is a loner at school, Lina reluctantly agrees to bring Maya to a play date arranged by Stacey (Michaela Watkins), a woman she hates. While accompanying the kids, Russ remarks that the house looks familiar, and is able to confirm that it was used as a location in an early 90s porn movie. Elsewhere, Jess and Shep are invited to a brunch with A.J. and his 19-year-old girlfriend, but when they go to pick them up, the young woman won't come out of the bathroom.
6	6	"Invisible Man"	Jamie Babbit	Dan O'Keefe	August 21, 2014	XMA01006	0.678
During his first post-vasectomy follow-up, Russ has a difficult time providing a semen sample, so he calls Lina to help with a fantasy. Lina is taken aback when the fantasy involves Russ giving her another baby, but she eventually plays along. Meanwhile, Lina seems happy to be donating all her baby stuff to a thrift store, until she sees that a woman who bought her bassinet plans to use it for a dying pet ferret.
7	7	"Waffles & Pizza"	Huck Botko	Story by : Salamo Levin & Andrew Gurland; Teleplay by : Salamo Levin	August 28, 2014	XMA01007	0.552
Russ and Lina find that the lease on their rental house is almost up, as new potential renters start dropping by to view the home. Lina falls in love with the home of a woman who is now dating A.J., and tries to hasten the woman's pending divorce. Elsewhere, Jess gets upset that her boss only pays her attention when he wants her to score drugs for him.
8	8	"The Old Date"	Huck Botko	Daisy Gardner	September 4, 2014	XMA01008	0.473
Russ and Lina go on a date in Venice Beach, where they lived before starting a family. They find a newer version of the surf shop Russ co-owned with partner Bruce, thinking he capitalized on Russ's surfboard design. Bruce is now in a wheelchair from being shot in a robbery and has sold the shop to new owners. He also blames the Bowmans for him getting shot. Russ then finds the surfboard in Bruce's bedroom and tries to steal it. Meanwhile, Bernie thinks A.J. is taking him to a strip club, but they first stop at a shiva for the mother of Jerry, Roxanne's new boyfriend. Roxanne tells an obnoxious A.J. to leave and seek professional help. He takes her advice to mean she still cares.
9	9	"Halloween"	Huck Botko	Dan O'Keefe	September 11, 2014	XMA01009	0.701
Lina goes to meet an old friend who is in town, but their time together is constantly interrupted by business colleagues that the friend also booked time to see. Russ and Jess try to get a reluctant A.J. to go to rehab. Ella wants a pirate costume after rejecting two others that Lina got for her, then says she wants to trick-or-treat with friends for the first time instead of with her younger sisters.
10	10	"Family Day"	Andrew Gurland	Story by : Daisy Gardner & Andrew Gurland; Teleplay by : Daisy Gardner	September 18, 2014	XMA01010	0.652
Lina and Russ have a buyer for their rental house, and have to step up their efforts to find a new place. An argument ensues when Russ suggests they completely uproot the family and start over in Costa Rica, while Lina prefers the more down-to-earth choice of staying in the L.A. area. Russ, Lina, Jess and Shep all visit A.J. at his resort-like rehab facility. A.J. tries to make his amends, but gets angered when his friends continue to discuss their own issues.

=== Season 2 (2015) ===
No. overall	No. in season	Title	Directed by	Written by	Original release date	Prod. code	US viewers (millions)
11	1	"Thanksgiving"	Jamie Babbit	Daisy Gardner	July 16, 2015	XMA02002	0.658
During a visit to Lina's mother at the Sunset Ranch retirement community, the family celebrates Thanksgiving together in September. After 14 years of marriage, Lina thinks that her stepfather is taking advantage of her mother's dementia after she goes through the bathroom cabinets. Meanwhile, Jess forbids Shep from dropping A.J.'s name in order to enroll their child in private school.
12	2	"Aftershocks"	Jamie Babbit	Samantha McIntyre	July 23, 2015	XMA02001	0.511
Russ tells Jess that he's not throwing a party for Lina's 40th birthday, claiming his wife doesn't like big parties. Later, Lina agrees to a party at Stacey's house to cheer her up because she's pondering a divorce with Jay. Jay convinces Russ that his marriage to Lina is always "under review." Lina and Russ want to escape from the dull party, so they jump in the pool.
13	3	"The Sandwich"	Jamie Babbit	Ari Posner	July 30, 2015	XMA02003	0.465
Lina and Russ plan a night out apart but end up babysitting their friends. Russ spends the night with Jess and ends up watching her stepson all night. Lina tries to fix up a widower with her friend Abby, but Abby ends up ditching Lina and the date for A.J. and a pastrami sandwich.
14	4	"Koreatown"	Nisha Ganatra	Story by : Michelle Gurland; Teleplay by : Laura Moses	August 6, 2015	XMA02004	0.401
After A.J. is fired, Russ and Bernie tag along while A.J. goes to a Korean karaoke bar to let off steam. While there, he spots his former business partner's Korean-American mistress, and sleeps with her as an act of revenge. Meanwhile, Lina hosts a sleep-over for Ella and eggs a house to get closer to her daughter and fit in with her friends.
15	5	"Pimps"	Nisha Ganatra	Samantha McIntyre	August 13, 2015	XMA02005	0.290
After Russ uses his assistant Miranda to ask his boss for vacation time off, Lina uses Maya's play-date to score a free vacation weekend at a condo on the beach. Elsewhere, A.J. misinterprets Abby's heavy drinking on their date as a problem, and secretly sets up an intervention for her.
16	6	"Murder!"	Jamie Babbit	BJ Porter	August 20, 2015	XMA02006	0.377
Russ and Lina skip work to trail their strange guest house resident, whom they think might have murdered his girlfriend. At work, Russ's boss forces him to fire Bernie, who is having a hard time learning how to behave appropriately for an office environment.
17	7	"The Cruise"	Jamie Babbit	Daisy Gardner	August 27, 2015	XMA02007	0.552
Russ's hypercritical mother Sharon (Joanna Cassidy) pays a visit and shares news that she is going on a cruise with an "interesting senior" she met online. When she later cancels the cruise, Russ thinks the real reason she visited is because she needs a place to stay. He offers the guest house, which she says is inadequate and refuses. Elsewhere, A.J.'s latest substitute for booze and drugs is "saving" webcam girls. When his latest project, a woman named Gloria (Misty Monroe), goes back to her webcam work instead of following her dream, A.J. gets Bernie and Shep involved.
18	8	"Mother's Day"	Andrew Gurland	Andrew Gurland & Daisy Gardner	September 3, 2015	XMA02012	0.405
Following a morning fight with Ella, Lina skips out on her Mother's Day brunch. Russ and the girls get to the restaurant to wait for Lina in hopes that she will show up, but Ella refuses to go inside despite coaxing from both Russ and A.J. After running into Shep and briefly conversing about child-rearing, Lina does show up for her brunch. Ella explains that when mom is frustrated with her daughters, she gets singled out because she is the oldest. She and Lina make up and finally do go inside.
19	9	"Guardians"	Nisha Ganatra	Andrew Gurland & Daisy Gardner	September 10, 2015	XMA02008	0.251
Lina leaves Ella in charge of her two younger siblings for the first time as she and Russ have a night out, but Lina worries and returns home early. Jess confronts Russ over why Lina won't let her watch the kids, and is convinced that Lina hates her. To try and clear the air, Lina and Russ have Jess and Shep over for a barbecue, but Jess and Shep begin a fight that ultimately results in their breakup. Meanwhile, A.J. tries to get closer to Abby by having his daughter meet her son, but finds that Abby is not yet ready to let him into her home life.
20	10	"1997"	Jamie Babbit	Kevin Napier	September 17, 2015	XMA02009	0.323
Russ and Lina visit the college where they met in 1997, as Russ is asked to give a speech for a design class. Lina goes to see an old art professor who once painted a nude portrait of her, but is disappointed when the professor doesn't remember who she is. Elsewhere, A.J. and Abby have made plans to have sex for the first time, but her son gets in the way.
21	11	"Triggers"	Jay Karas	Kevin Napier & Salamo Levin	September 24, 2015	XMA02010	0.395
A.J. goes overboard trying to get Russ to do the illustrations for his children's book about addiction, even accusing Russ of being an unsupportive friend when he can't take time off from his day job to help. Meanwhile, Lina tries to convince Abby that her ex is taking advantage of lingering feelings she still has for him.
22	12	"Gymnastics"	Jay Karas	Dan O'Keefe	October 1, 2015	XMA02011	0.414
At Maya's gymnastics meet, Russ runs into Kristi (Maria Thayer), a woman he dated briefly while he and Lina were on a break, and whom he left without officially breaking up. Kristi is a judge at the meet, and Russ thinks she may still harbor a grudge after she gives Maya the lowest scores of any official. Meanwhile, Shep introduces A.J. and Bernie to a potential publisher for A.J.'s children's book, but the female publisher winds up dating Shep and passing on the book.
23	13	"The Waiter"	Andrew Gurland	Samantha McIntyre	October 1, 2015	XMA02013	0.267
Russ has an opportunity to invest in a new design business that two staff members at the Design Center are planning, but he worries about the risk upon hearing that Lina isn't really interested in keeping her teaching assistant job. Lina soon decides to fight for her job, and produces a children's play based on A.J.'s book. Russ misinterprets Miranda's excitement over the new design business as a sign that she's interested in him. Meanwhile, Abby is afraid to reveal any part of A.J.'s past to her visiting parents.

== Reception ==
On Rotten Tomatoes, the first season of Married has an aggregate score of 56% based on 20 positive and 16 negative critic reviews. The website's consensus reads: "In spite of superlative work from its talented stars, Married suffers from an unrelentingly grim portrayal of grown-up relationships."
