= Allegra Coleman =

Fictional celebrity

- Ali Larter on the cover of Esquire portraying the fictional Allegra Coleman
- First appearance: Esquire, November 1996
- Created by: Martha Sherrill

In-universe information
- Gender: Female
- Occupation: Celebrity

Allegra Coleman was a fictional celebrity invented by writer Martha Sherrill for the purposes of a hoax magazine article. Ali Larter (then a model; later an actress) portrayed the imaginary actress in Sherrill's feature, "Dream Girl," which appeared in Esquire (November 1996).

== History ==
In a parody of celebrity profiles, the article described Coleman's role in an upcoming movie with Woody Allen, her tempestuous relationship with David Schwimmer (including a scandal involving nude photographs taken by paparazzi), and her friendship with Deepak Chopra. She is said to be 22 years old, and to be the "part Cherokee, part Czech" daughter of "pop-art photographer Max A.F. Coleman" and "actress Kay Garland, who played the spoiled daughter in Mildred Pierce", both also fictitious. The Colemans were supposedly "a legendary family of circus performers and poets" who were "always broke and often drunk", and Allegra had "lived in five countries" before she was nine. Her father left his marriage and family in 1981 (he is said to have "disappeared into the downtown New York drag queen scene"), and her mother abandoned the family (to become a "Tibetan Buddhist nun") in 1985, leaving Allegra, then 11, in a small yellow stucco house in Riverside, California to raise her siblings with assistance from relatives and friends. Coleman was married briefly at 17 to "Mike Mumy", the (fictitious) brother of actor Billy Mumy; only five years later, Allegra has "no idea" where Mike Mumy may have gotten to.

Within the context of the article, Coleman is already a successful actress, having appeared in the TV series Melrose Place, and the films Down Periscope, Guarding Tess and Cliffhanger, amongst others. Also within the context of the article, her life has been the subject of tabloid reportage and speculation for some time. She is consistently portrayed in the article as flighty, irresponsible, and sweetly vacuous (Salon called her "brainless perfection"), but with a look and personal quality of "simple, irresistible vulgarity" that made her magnetically compelling. By the end of the article, however, in a surrealistic turn, serious ambiguities are raised about Allegra's actual existence; she seems to have disappeared after a car crash and it is noted that "We would always have her, and the idea of her — this glorious, young, alive vision — which is all we want in the end, it turns out. Actual existence was a minor issue."

The many deliberate (and easily spotted) inaccuracies, improbabilities and contradictions were meant to be indicative that the article was a satire of a typically breathless style of celebrity profile articles, and indeed Salon magazine identified the article as a hoax immediately upon publication. The hoax was formally revealed by Esquire editor Edward Kosner in a press release to the news wire services.

The article was photographed by photographer Troy House, who knew Ali Larter from previous jobs and approached her about doing the parody. Larter, then 20, was two years younger than the fictitious Coleman. Several photos were manipulated to show "Coleman" interacting with Schwimmer, Chopra, Quentin Tarantino, and Pauly Shore.

Sherrill later wrote a satirical novel on Hollywood life that was essentially both an expansion and continuation of the original "Dream Girl" article, and featured Allegra Coleman as a prominent character. The novel, My Last Movie Star, was published by Random House in 2003.

== Reaction ==
Writing in Salon, David Futrelle commented that the article seemed to hearken back to Esquire's mid-1960s heyday.

The article written about Coleman as the new "It Girl" prompted calls from studios and talent scouts eager to offer Coleman scripts. The incident jump-started Ali Larter's acting career, and she went on to appear in TV shows (including the Niki Sanders role in NBC's Heroes) and movies (including Varsity Blues, Legally Blonde, and Final Destination).

== See also ==
- Simone (2002 film)
