= Three Way =

3-Way
- Three Way
- Directed by: Scott Ziehl
- Written by: Russell P. Marleau
- Produced by: Russell P. Marleau; Christian Mills
- Starring: Dominic Purcell; Joy Bryant; Ali Larter; Desmond Harrington; Dwight Yoakam; Gina Gershon
- Cinematography: Antonio Calvache
- Edited by: Debra Goldfield
- Music by: Christopher Hoag
- Production company: Hyperion Pictures
- Distributed by: Brainstorm Media
- Release date: June 29, 2004
- Running time: 88 minutes
- Country: United States
- Language: English

Three Way is a 2004 neo-noir crime thriller film directed by Scott Ziehl and starring Dominic Purcell, Joy Bryant, Ali Larter, Desmond Harrington, Dwight Yoakam and Gina Gershon. The plot, based on Gil Brewer's pulp novel Wild To Possess, concerns a kidnapping plot. The film was released also with titles 3-way and Three Way Split.

== Plot ==
When Lew Brookbank (Dominic Purcell) learns that his wife is having an affair with another man, he grabs his gun and goes in search of revenge, only to find the two in bed together on his boat, murdered. Between a strong motive for killing the two of them and a shady past, Lew fears he will be the police's prime suspect, and so dumps the bodies into the ocean, abandons the boat, and leaves San Diego.

Settling in a town outside Santa Barbara, he finds work making signboards, meets a girl, Rita (Joy Bryant), and goes on with life as before. Working along the side of the road one evening placing signboards, he stumbles upon a couple, Isobel (Ali Larter) and Ralph (Desmond Harrington), planning the kidnapping and murder of Ralph's wife, Florence (Gina Gershon). He immediately devises a plan to steal the ransom money from the two of them. It is at this time that Herbert (Dwight Yoakam), brother of Lew's late-wife's lover, appears, claiming to know that it Lew who is responsible for his brother's disappearance and promising to turn over a gun left on the boat where the two had been killed.

Ralph kidnaps his wife Florence with the help of his girlfriend Isobel and keeps her in a boat. Lew has been following them and takes Florence away from the boat. Then he phones Ralph anonymously, threatening to call police unless he cuts him in for half the ransom money. Ralph agrees. Ralph and Isobel suspect that it is Florence who has some accomplice of her own and is blackmailing them. Lew sends Rita to get the money from Ralph. But Lew's plans turns awry when Herbert interrupts and kills Florence. When Rita comes back she finds Herbert struggling with Lew and shoots him dead. She later finds that the money she brought from Ralph is fake. Lew goes to Isobel and Ralph to ask them about the real money. Meanwhile Rita tips off the police. Soon the police come and arrest Lew, Ralph and Isobel. Lew is later released with the aid of Rita, who had hidden the real money herself.

== Cast ==
- Dominic Purcell as Lewis "Lew" Brookbank
- Joy Bryant as Rita Caswell
- Ali Larter as Isobel Delano
- Desmond Harrington as Ralph Hagen
- Dwight Yoakam as Herbert Claremont / Clarkson
- Gina Gershon as Florence DeCroix Hagen
- Roxana Zal as Janice Brookbank
- Dan Martin as Patrolman
- Al Israel as The Cashier
