= Gaia (film) =

- Theatrical release poster
- Directed by: Jaco Bouwer
- Screenplay by: Tertius Kapp
- Produced by: Jaco Bouwer; Tertius Kapp; Jorrie van der Walt; Wikus du Toit
- Starring: Monique Rockman; Carel Nel; Alex van Dyk; Anthony Oseyemi
- Cinematography: Jorrie van der Walt
- Edited by: Leon Visser
- Music by: Pierre-Henri Wicomb
- Production companies: XYZ Films; Film Initiative Africa; kykNET Films
- Release date: 16 March 2021 (SXSW)
- Country: South Africa
- Languages: English; Afrikaans
- Box office: $126,126

Gaia is a 2021 South African horror thriller film produced and directed by Jaco Bouwer from a screenplay by Tertius Kapp. It stars Monique Rockman, Carel Nel, Alex van Dyk, and Anthony Oseyemi.

It had its world premiere at South by Southwest in the United States on 16 March 2021. It had a limited theatrical release in the country on 18 June 2021, prior to a video on demand release the week after, by Decal. The film received positive reviews from critics, with praise directed at the film's visuals.

== Plot ==
Gabi and Winston, two employees of South Africa's forestry service, are travelling along a river in the Tsitsikamma forest when Gabi loses the drone she is controlling. Gabi decides to enter the forest, retrieve the drone and rejoin Winston later.

While walking through the forest, Gabi triggers a trap, which leads to a wooden stake piercing through her foot. Gabi removes the stake and heads deeper into the forest, which is soon covered by a red glow as night falls. She comes across a wooden house and enters it to rest and recover from her injury. Barend and his son Stefan, two Afrikaner survivalists who had set up the trap and who live in the house, find Gabi resting in the house and treat her injury.

Winston hears Gabi scream as she pulls out the stake, and he heads into the forest to look for her, but is unable to find her. After night falls, he encounters strange creatures in the forest and becomes infected by a rapidly-growing fungus while hiding from the creatures.

Throughout the film, Gabi grows close to Stefan, and she also experiences nightmares that involve fungi growing from her body, later finding patches of fungi growing on her arms and legs. She learns from Barend that he used to be a plant pathologist who started living in the forest after his wife Lily died of bone cancer thirteen years prior, and that Stefan was conceived in the house, which was where he and Lily had their honeymoon. Barend then states that he met "God" while in the forest.

Later, Gabi is almost infected by a similar rapidly-growing fungus while sleeping, but she is saved when Barend wakes her up due to the creatures trying to break into the house. The creatures break in and are revealed to be ordinary humans covered with fungus. Barend explains that the fungus infects humans and feeds on the eyes, mouth and lungs, and that they infect other people via spores. He also explains that the largest organism on the planet lives close to the house and is looking to spread, saying: "She was here long before the apes started dreaming of gods."

The next day, Gabi finds Barend's writings, which compare humanity to monkeys in captivity. Barend provides offerings to a tree, which contains the previously mentioned organism, and both he and Stefan eat some of the mushrooms growing in the tree. Barend and Gabi start heading out of the forest when Gabi finds Winston's flashlight, and they find Winston, who is now covered with several species of fungi. Winston, who is still alive, begs them to kill him. Gabi stops Barend from shooting him with an arrow. Winston impales himself on one of Barend's arrows. The noise attracts the attention of the creatures, forcing Barend and Gabi to return to the house.

After finding lichen on her thigh, Stefan secretly gives Gabi one of the mushrooms that Barend has been harvesting from the offering tree.

Stefan takes Gabi to see his mother, who has been transformed into an animate tree and still has her wedding ring on one of her transformed fingers. Gabi goes through the photos stored in an SD card from one of the cameras she and Winston placed in the forest and finds that several of the photos show the creatures. Barend reveals in a rant that he believes the world is doomed due to humanity's actions.

Gabi and Stefan begin heading towards the city, but are confronted by Barend, who convinces Stefan to stay in the forest. Gabi begins heading back to the city alone, and Barend decides to sacrifice Stefan to the organism. However, Gabi changes her mind and returns in time to stop Barend from sacrificing Stefan; Stefan ends up stabbing Barend in the spine during their struggle. Barend is later shown with the fungus growing from his back and offering his own blood to the organism.

Some time later, Gabi becomes infected by the fungus and her body becomes covered with it. She begs Stefan to kill her, and it is implied that he does so. Stefan leaves Gabi's body in the house and heads to the city, where he has a meal and then leaves the restaurant; the leftovers of his meal quickly become covered with fungus.

== Cast ==
- Monique Rockman as Gabi
- Carel Nel as Barend
- Alex Van Dyk as Stefan
- Anthony Oseyemi as Winston

== Production ==
The film was shot in South Africa's Garden Route region.

== Release ==
On 5 March 2021, Decal acquired the North American distribution rights to the film. The film had its world premiere at South by Southwest on 16 March 2021. It was released in a limited release on 18 June 2021, prior to video on demand on 25 June 2021.

== Reception ==
On the review aggregator website Rotten Tomatoes, 84% of 60 critics' reviews are positive. The website's consensus reads: "If its narrative ambitions aren't always equaled by its chilling visuals, Gaia remains an effective slice of ecological horror." On Metacritic, the film holds a rating of 64 out of 100, based on 9 critics, indicating "generally favorable" reviews.

A. A. Dowd, writing for The A.V. Club, gave the film a grade of C+, saying: "Even when the story takes on biblical overtones, the melodrama never blossoms. And in terms of suspense, Gaia doesn't so much tighten the screws as endlessly turn them in the wrong direction." However, he praised the film for relying on prosthetic makeup rather than computer-generated imagery for many of its effects, and added: "there's some uniquely discomforting body horror, as characters scratch at wounds that have sprouted stems, caps, and gills." He concluded: "Gaia might not creep under the skin as insidiously as a hostile fungus, but it should play well to the mental state of anyone with mushrooms on the mind, so to speak."

Sheila O'Malley, writing for RogerEbert.com, gave the film a score of 3 out of 4 stars, saying that the film "has a lot to say about humanity's destruction of the environment … but the film says it with creativity, mad flights of imagination, and even humor" and described it as "a thought-provoking and disturbing experience", praising many of the film's sequences as "very unnerving" and describing the visuals as "extraordinary". She concluded: "The 'message' of Gaia is simple, and yet it's told in a way that complicates and maybe even obscures the message. That's not necessarily a bad thing."

Wes Greene of Slant Magazine was more critical of the film, giving it a score of 2 out of 4 stars. He wrote: "the film employs an array of techniques, including manipulated footage of natural phenomena and creature makeup effects ... to suggest nature as a source of simultaneous beauty and fear. But after a while, these effects come to feel like mere affectation, as well as this rather aloof film's only source of complexity." Guy Lodge of Variety wrote, "In an elegant fusion of digital and prosthetic artistry, patches of moss burst through skin like a nasty rash; human flesh is aggressively and involuntarily camouflaged by flora. Gaia's resourceful visuals, however, aren't matched by equivalent nimbleness in the writing; after a time, the storytelling feels more anemic than enigmatic."

== See also ==
- The Voice in the Night (short story)
- Matango
