= Ali Larter =

American actress and former model (born 1976)

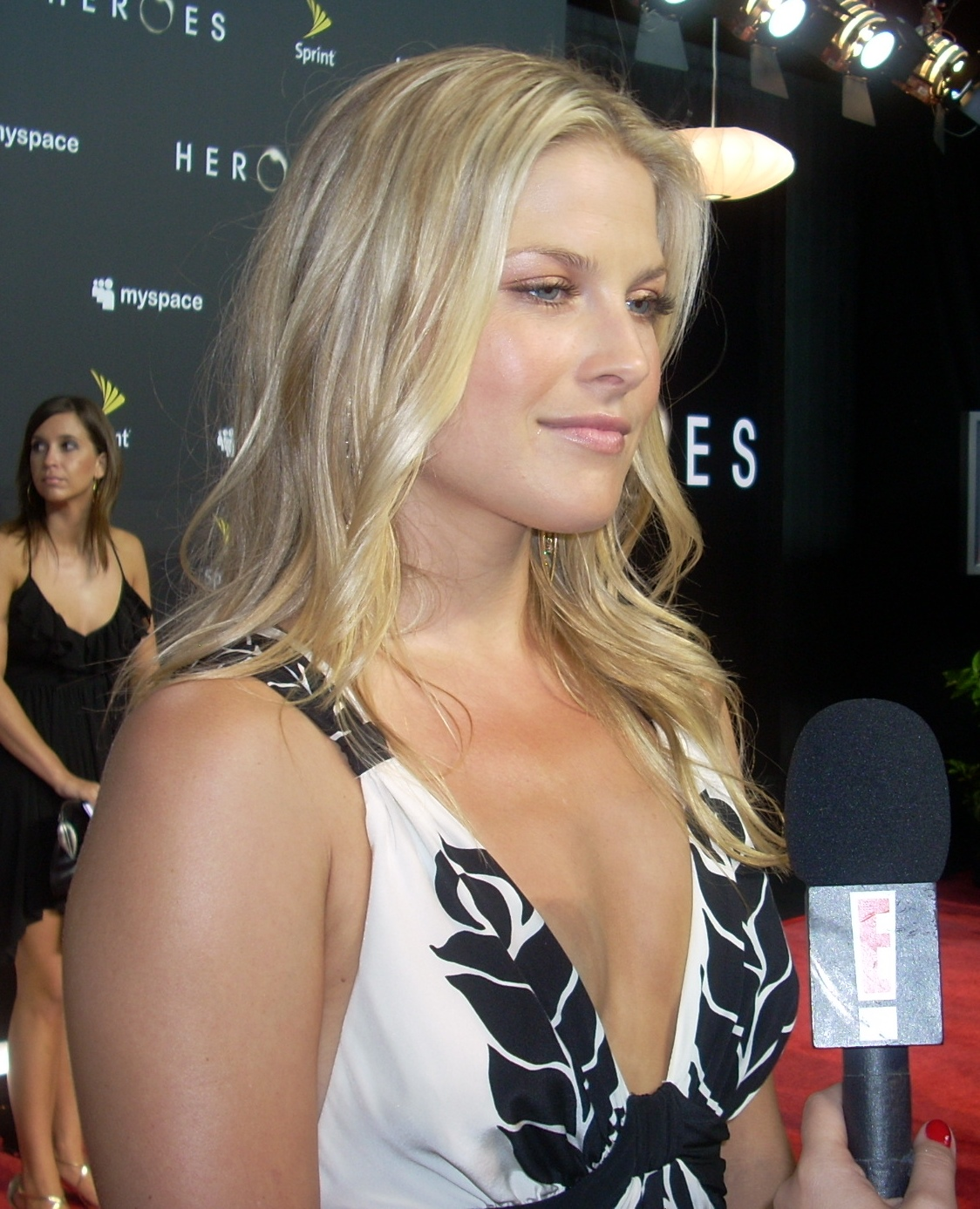
- Larter at a Heroes event, September 2008
- Born: Alison Elizabeth Larter; February 28, 1976 (age 50); Cherry Hill, New Jersey, U.S.
- Occupations: Actress; model
- Years active: 1997–present
- Spouse: Hayes MacArthur (m. 2009)
- Children: 2
- Relatives: Scott MacArthur (brother-in-law)
- Website: alilarter.com

Alison Elizabeth Larter (born February 28, 1976), is an American actress and former model. She portrayed fictional model Allegra Coleman in a 1996 Esquire magazine hoax and took on guest roles on several television shows in the 1990s. Her film debut in Varsity Blues (1999) was followed by a role in the horror film House on Haunted Hill (1999). She portrayed Clear Rivers in the Final Destination franchise (2000–2003), establishing her as a scream queen.

Larter played supporting roles in Legally Blonde (2001), Jay and Silent Bob Strike Back (2001), and the romantic comedy A Lot Like Love (2005), and main roles in the Bollywood movie Marigold (2007) and the thriller Obsessed (2009). She achieved wider recognition for playing the dual roles of Niki Sanders and Tracy Strauss on the science fiction drama series Heroes (2006–2010) on NBC, and for portraying video game heroine Claire Redfield in three films of the Resident Evil film series (2007–2016). Larter costars as Angela Norris in the Paramount+ drama series Landman (2024).

As of April 2017, Larter's films have grossed over $1.31 billion worldwide. Her presence in the media is reinforced by her appearances in lists compiled by Maxim, FHM, and Stuff as well as People's "Best Dressed List" in 2007. She published a cookbook, Kitchen Revelry: A Year of Festive Menus from My Home to Yours, in September 2013.

== Early life ==
Ali Larter was born in Cherry Hill, New Jersey to Margaret Walker, a realtor, and Danforth Larter, a trucking executive. She attended Carusi Middle School and went to Cherry Hill High School West, but she did not finish her senior year of high school due to being too busy modeling. Her mother accompanied her everywhere until she turned 18. Her parents have since moved to Allentown, Pennsylvania. Larter said she was a tomboy until she turned 13.

== Career ==
=== 1990–1998: Early modeling and television roles ===
Larter began her modeling career at the age of 14 when a modeling scout discovered her on the street and asked her to star in a Philadelphia Phillies commercial. That led to a modeling contract with the prestigious Ford Modeling Agency in Manhattan, New York. Larter subsequently skipped her senior year to model in Australia, Italy, and Japan; Japan being a country she temporarily lived in at 17. While modeling in Italy, Larter met fellow model and aspiring actress Amy Smart and the two "became instant friends", according to Larter.

In November 1996, Larter portrayed fictional actress Allegra Coleman in an Esquire magazine hoax. When speaking about the cover and her fame, Larter said, "When the door opens for you in Hollywood, you need to run with it. You know?" Larter is signed to IMG Models. She landed her first professional acting roles in 1997 when she appeared in several television programs. She appeared in "The Ways and Means", an episode of the NBC television series Suddenly Susan starring Brooke Shields, and the short-lived series Chicago Sons also on NBC. The roles were followed by a number of other appearances on Dawson's Creek on The WB, CBS' Chicago Hope, and Just Shoot Me! on NBC.

=== 1999–2005: Film debut and breakthrough ===
In 1999, Larter made her film debut in the coming-of-age dramedy Varsity Blues, which reunited her with Dawson's Creek star James Van Der Beek and close friend Amy Smart. Smart had persuaded Larter to audition for the movie, in which Larter played Darcy Sears, a love interest for Lance Harbor (Paul Walker). Varsity Blues drew a domestic box office gross of $53 million. Also in 1999, she made supporting appearances in the teen comedies Giving It Up and Drive Me Crazy, and starred in the remake House on Haunted Hill which was made for around $20 million. The horror film about a group of strangers invited to a party at an abandoned asylum, was panned by critics, but grossed $15 million on its opening weekend eventually earning over $40 million overall.

Larter starred as Clear Rivers, one of the main characters in the teen supernatural horror film Final Destination (2000). Also starring Devon Sawa from British Columbia, and Kerr Smith, the movie's premise is several teenagers survive a plane crash but are stalked and killed by death itself. Final Destination made $112 million by the end of its theatrical run. In 2001, she appeared in the comedy Legally Blonde with Reese Witherspoon. Larter played Brooke Taylor Windham, a widow accused of her husband Hayworth's murder. The film held the top spot with $20 million in its opening weekend and ended up grossing $141 million worldwide. With $96 million of its total gross deriving from domestic markets, Legally Blonde is her highest-grossing film domestically.

Larter next appeared as Zerelda Mimms in the western comedy American Outlaws. Directed by Les Mayfield and co-starring Irish actor Colin Farrell and Scott Caan, the film was poorly received by critics and at the box office making only $13 million. She also starred in Kevin Smith's Jay and Silent Bob Strike Back. In 2001, Larter appeared on the cover of Maxim magazine and performed in the stage play The Vagina Monologues in Manhattan, New York. In Spring 2002, Larter moved from Los Angeles to New York. "I was too young and impressionable to handle the pressures of L.A." Larter later recalled in an interview: "I'm a woman now. I am no longer the little girl who could be easily influenced (back then)." While in New York City, she made herself available for independent film projects and being in theater.

Larter's first project in New York City was to reprise her role as Clear Rivers in the sequel to Final Destination entitled Final Destination 2. In an interview with IGN, Larter said, "When New Line asked me to come back, I thought it was great. They showed me the script and let me have some input, and it was really terrific." The film made $90 million worldwide with a mixed critical reception. In 2004, Larter served as an associate producer of and starred in the thriller Three Way. Afterwards, Larter commented on future producing endeavors during an interview about Resident Evil: Extinction: "I definitely have many ideas and different avenues that I want to take as my career goes on." In 2005, she appeared in Confess, an independent political thriller, and had a role in the romantic comedy A Lot Like Love, starring Amanda Peet and Ashton Kutcher. Also in 2005, she returned to living in Los Angeles.

=== 2006–2013: Rise to prominence and subsequent hiatus ===
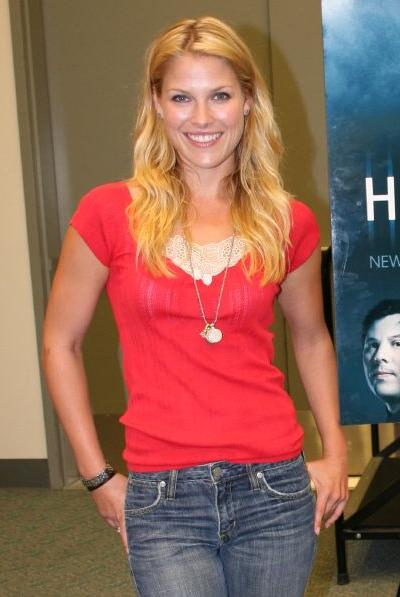
Larter promoting Heroes at the 2006 San Diego Comic-Con

Larter auditioned for the science fiction drama television series Heroes on NBC while living in Los Angeles. She played the characters of Niki Sanders, who suffered from dissociative identity disorder, and Tracy Strauss on the show created by Tim Kring. Larter's initial character Niki Sanders, was a wife, mother, and a former internet stripper from Las Vegas exhibiting superhuman strength and alternate personalities who go by the names of Jessica and Niki. "Ali read for the part and just owned it from the second she walked in," Kring said to the Chicago Tribune, "It was a very impressive audition." In the third and fourth seasons, Larter played the new character of Tracy Strauss, who possessed the ability to freeze objects and later, transform her body into water.

Larter took on the title role in Marigold (2007), alongside Salman Khan, an Indian actor. The film was released in August 2007 and revolved around Marigold Lexington, an American actress (Larter) who goes to India and gets caught up in the exotic world of Bollywood. Filming took place in North India and London, commencing in June 2004. In an interview with the BBC, Larter remarked this role was "an opportunity to overcome my fear of singing and dancing because I have no professional training... I really focused on the character and loved this journey she went on and the experiences she had." She was paid a seven-figure salary for her part in the film.

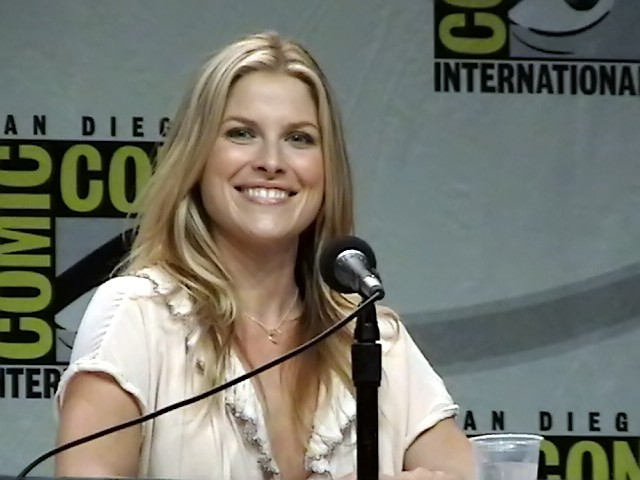
Larter promoting Resident Evil: Extinction at the 2007 San Diego Comic Con

In 2007, she appeared opposite Milla Jovovich in Resident Evil: Extinction, portraying Claire Redfield, who in the film, is the leader of a convoy of zombie apocalypse survivors going to Alaska in search of a safe haven. Her role sent her to Mexicali, Mexico for filming from May to late July, and required her hair to be dyed a light red. Speaking about her character Claire, Larter said, "She became the leader of this convoy. She's incredibly strong, patient. I think she serves a role for everyone within this convoy, let it be a mother to someone, a buddy, a best friend." Despite negative reviews, the film made $147 million worldwide. Also in the same year, she appeared with Hayes MacArthur in the comedy Homo Erectus and appeared as Evelyn Garland in the biographical drama Crazy, based on guitarist Hank Garland.

Larter starred opposite Beyoncé and Idris Elba from London, in the Screen Gems-produced thriller Obsessed (2009). The film follows an office executive Derek Charles (Elba) whose marriage to Knowles' character Sharon is threatened by the aggressive interests of a co-worker Lisa Sheridan, portrayed by Larter. In an interview with Glam, Larter said that she "was excited to get the chance to play a femme fatale. I love playing women that are dark and vulnerable and sort of filled with a little bit of crazy emotion." While the film was released to mixed reviews, Larter was critically praised for her performance. Derek Malcolm of the Evening Standard felt that the movie was a "dim reworking of Fatal Attraction" and noted: "Larter as the pathological minx is the best thing about it." Obsessed opened No. 1 in its opening weekend with $28 million, and making a total domestic gross of $68 million, becoming Larter's second highest-grossing film in North-America. Larter was nominated for a third time for a Teen Choice Award when she and Beyoncé were nominated for the Teen Choice Award for Choice Movie: Rumble at the 2009 Teen Choice Awards and an MTV Movie Award for Best Fight both for Obsessed.

Larter reprised her role of Claire Redfield in Resident Evil: Afterlife (2010), which was filmed in 3D and saw her character ambushed and mentally manipulated by the fictional Umbrella Corporation, before she is rescued by Alice (Milla Jovovich). Like the previous Resident Evil entries, the film received negative reviews but became a major commercial success, earning $296 million worldwide. On returning to the role of Claire, Larter told JoBlo.com: "I guess people liked me as her... I'm excited that they brought me back... to work with the man [Paul W. S. Anderson] who really created this world and this vision was what excited me about joining this next installment". In 2010, Larter appeared as the title character in a short film for Absolut Vodka entitled "Lemon Drop". After the release of Afterlife, Larter went on hiatus to focus on her family.

=== 2014–present: Return to acting and resurgence ===
Larter returned to the big screen playing Molly Kingston, the love interest of Charlie Darby, a successful but psychotic man (Matt LeBlanc) in the comedy Lovesick (2014). The film screened at the 15th annual Newport Beach Film Festival in Newport Beach, California and was released for VOD and selected theaters. She portrayed Keely, the "fair-weather" friend of Kate Parker (Hilary Swank), a woman with ALS in the independent drama You're Not You (2014), directed by George C. Wolfe. Her co-stars were Emmy Rossum and Josh Duhamel.

In 2014, Larter obtained a regular part in the first season of TNT's drama series Legends, appearing as Crystal McGuire, an operative with the FBI's Deep Cover Operations. She starred in the supernatural thriller The Diabolical as Madison, a single mother who battles evil forces in her house. Released in 2015 at South by Southwest in Austin, Texas, it was distributed for a VOD and limited release in only certain parts of the United States. The film received largely mixed reviews; Gary Goldstein of the Los Angeles Times felt that her "fraught, more seemingly complex [character] remains underdeveloped" in what he described as a "weak horror-thriller".

Larter starred in Resident Evil: The Final Chapter (2016), where her role of Claire teams up with Alice (Jovovich) and the Red Queen (Ever Anderson) to save the remnants of humanity. Despite a largely mixed critical response it grossed over $312 million worldwide. The film is Larter's biggest box office success. She played the role of Amelia Slater in the Fox series Pitch, about Ginny Baker (Kylie Bunbury), a young black woman who makes history by becoming the first woman to play for a Major League Baseball team. The series ran for a season, which was released in 2016.

From 2019 to 2020, Larter acted in the recurring role of Grace Sawyer in the police procedural series The Rookie on ABC In 2021, she played the lead role in the neo-western film The Last Victim. She starred in the thriller The Man in the White Van, which premiered at the 2023 Newport Beach Film Festival and was released in December 2024 to mixed reviews. In 2024, Larter co-starred in Taylor Sheridan’s show Landman, starring Billy Bob Thornton. Larter plays Angela Norris, a “cartoonish” funny caricature of a gold-digging ex-wife.

== Media image ==
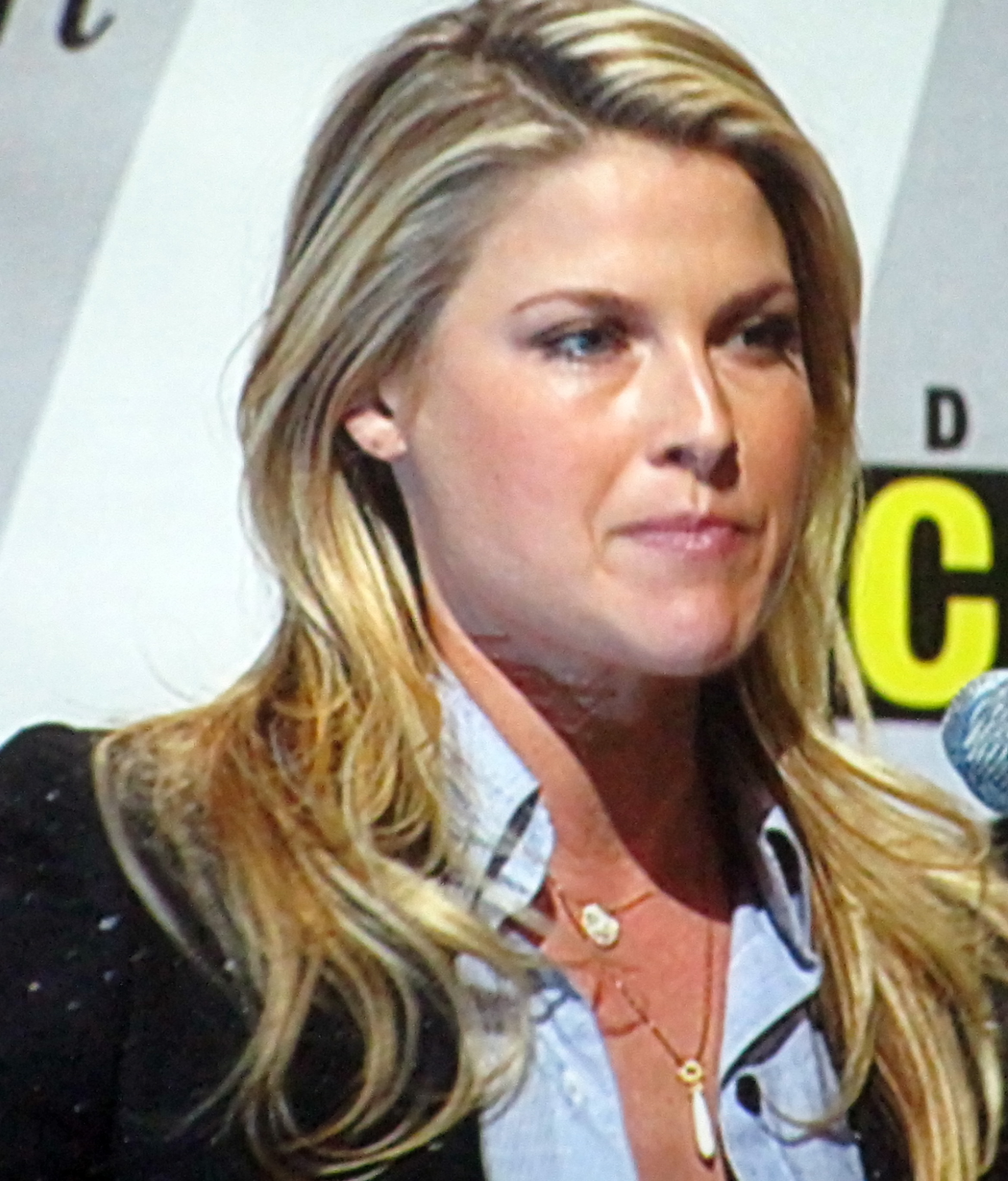
Larter at the 2010 San Diego Comic-Con

Larter first appeared in the media when she portrayed the fictional character of Allegra Coleman in the November 1996 issue of Esquire. The magazine, which billed Coleman as the movies' next dream girl, relayed Allegra's relationship with David Schwimmer, how Quentin Tarantino broke up with Mira Sorvino to date her, and Woody Allen then overhauled a film to give her a starring role. When the magazine was published, Esquire received hundreds of phone calls about the non-existent Coleman and various talent agencies sought to represent her, even after the hoax was revealed. Larter herself received a considerable amount of attention after the cover; she received phone calls from morning TV shows and others for interviews.

The Esquire cover led Larter to a role on Varsity Blues. One particular scene where Larter's character, Darcy Sears, wears nothing but whipped cream to cover herself has become a media favorite. It has been referenced many times in the media including on MTV's Jersey Shore, where a character refers to it as being the "Varsity Blues outfit". Larter has been acknowledged as a scream queen by MSN due to her appearances in horror/thriller films. After the success of Heroes, she appeared on People's "Ten Best Dressed List" as "The Newcomer" in 2007. In 2009, she was named Cosmopolitan's Fun Fearless Female of the year at a ceremony held in Beverly Hills, California.

Larter has appeared on the cover of numerous magazines including (in alphabetical order) Allure, Cosmopolitan (France, Indonesia, Ecuador, Germany, Greece, Turkey and U.S.), Entertainment Weekly, Esquire, Glamour, Health, InStyle, Lucky, Maxim, Philadelphia Style, Self, Seventeen, and Shape.

In June 2010, Larter was one of thousands of delegates from 130 countries who participated in a United Nations conference, Women Deliver in Washington, D.C. Larter, along with her husband Hayes MacArthur, hosted The Art of Elysium Gala in 2013 and they were recipients of the Spirit of Elysium Award at the January 2014 ceremony.

== Personal life ==
While a model, Larter moved to Los Angeles to pursue acting. In 2002, she moved to New York City for three years. In an interview with Phillymag, she gave reason for the move:

I took some time off to define myself outside the pressures of the industry. Part of me really needed to know if this is what I wanted to do with the rest of my life.

In January 2005, she went back to living in Los Angeles for a role in Heroes. In December 2007, Larter and her longtime boyfriend, Hayes MacArthur were engaged. They had met on the set of National Lampoon's Homo Erectus. In a 2007 interview with Cosmopolitan, Larter said: "I told my boyfriend after three weeks that I wanted to marry him and that we could do it tomorrow." On August 1, 2009, Larter and MacArthur married at MacArthur's parents' estate in Kennebunkport, Maine. Among the wedding guests was Larter's close friend and fellow actress Amy Smart. Larter and MacArthur purchased a three-story home in the Hollywood Hills for $2.9 million in 2012. During the COVID-19 pandemic, they moved to Sun Valley, Idaho.

On July 20, 2010, Larter announced that she and MacArthur were expecting their first child and on the September 10 episode of Late Night with Jimmy Fallon, announced that she was expecting a boy. Larter gave birth to their son in 2010. In August 2014, Larter confirmed that she and MacArthur were expecting their second child that winter and she had a girl in 2015. As of 2013, Larter had two dogs, Jackpot, a German Shepherd and Ella, a Wheaten terrier. On November 10, 2025 on Live with Kelly and Mark, Larter talked about the importance of working with Higher Ground of Sun Valley, Idaho; her father was in the U.S. Army and deployed to Vietnam during the Vietnam War.

== Filmography ==
Key
†	Denotes works that have not yet been released

=== Film ===
Year	Title	Role	Notes	Ref.
1999	Giving It Up	Amber		
1999	Drive Me Crazy	Dulcie		
1999	Varsity Blues	Darcy Sears		
1999	House on Haunted Hill	Sara Wolfe		
2000	Final Destination	Clear Rivers		
2001	Legally Blonde	Brooke Taylor-Windham		
2001	American Outlaws	Zerelda "Zee" Mimms		
2001	Jay and Silent Bob Strike Back	Chrissy		
2003	Final Destination 2	Clear Rivers		
2004	Three Way	Isobel Delano	Also associate producer	
2005	A Lot Like Love	Gina		
2005	Confess	Olivia Averill		
2007	Homo Erectus	Fardart		
2007	Marigold	Marigold Lexton		
2007	Resident Evil: Extinction	Claire Redfield		
2007	Crazy	Evelyn Garland		
2009	Obsessed	Lisa Sheridan		
2010	Resident Evil: Afterlife	Claire Redfield		
2014	Lovesick	Molly Kingston		
2014	You're Not You	Keely		
2015	The Diabolical	Madison		
2016	Resident Evil: The Final Chapter	Claire Redfield		
2021	The Last Victim	Susan	Also executive producer	
2022	The Hater	Victoria		
2023	The Man in the White Van	Hellen Williams		
2024	Spin the Bottle	Maura Randell		

=== Television ===
Year	Title	Role	Notes	Ref.
1997	Suddenly Susan	Maddie	Episode: "The Ways and Means"	
1997	Chicago Sons	Angela	Episode: "Beauty and the Butt"	
1998	Chicago Hope	Samantha	Episode: "Memento Mori"	
1998	Just Shoot Me!	Karey Burke	Episode: "College or Collagen"	
1998	Dawson's Creek	Kristy Livingstone	Episodes: "The Dance" and "The Kiss"	
2004	Entourage	Herself	Episode: "Pilot"	
2006–2010	Heroes	Niki Sanders/Jessica Sanders/Gina Sanders; Tracy Strauss	Main role; 55 episodes	
2012	The Asset	Anna King	Unsold television pilot	
2013	The League	Georgia Thompson	Episode: "The Credit Card Alert"	
2014	Legends	Crystal McGuire	Main role; 10 episodes (season 1)	
2016	Pitch	Amelia Slater	Main role; 10 episodes	
2017	Curb Your Enthusiasm	TV Detective #1	Episode: "The Shucker"	
2018–2019	Splitting Up Together	Paige	Recurring role; 3 episodes (season 2)	
2019–2020	The Rookie	Dr. Grace Sawyer	Recurring role; 13 episodes (season 2)	
2020–2021	Top Secret Videos	NSA Agent Daniels	Recurring role; 3 episodes	
2021	Creepshow	Pam Spinster	Episode: "Dead and Breakfast/Pesticide"	
2024–present	Landman	Angela Norris	Main role; 20 episodes	

== Awards and nominations ==
Year	Award	Category	Work	Result
2001	Blockbuster Entertainment Awards	Favorite Horror Actress	Final Destination	Nominated
2001	Young Hollywood Awards	Best Breakthrough Performance by a Female	Final Destination	Won
2007	Saturn Awards	Best Supporting Actress on Television	Heroes	Nominated
2007	Scream Awards	Scream Queen	Heroes	Nominated
2007	Scream Awards	Sexiest Superhero	Heroes	Nominated
2008	Gracie Allen Awards	Outstanding Supporting Actress in a Drama Series	Heroes	Won
2008	Teen Choice Awards	Choice Action TV Actress	Heroes	Nominated
2009	Teen Choice Awards	Choice Action TV Actress	Heroes	Nominated
2009	Teen Choice Awards	Choice Movie Rumble	Obsessed	Nominated
2010	MTV Movie & TV Awards	Best Fight (Note: Shared with Beyoncé Knowles.)	Obsessed	Won
2026	Actor Award	Actor Award for Outstanding Performance by an Ensemble in a Drama Series	Landman	Nominated
2026	Satellite Award	Satellite Award for Best Cast – Television Series	Landman	Won
