= Fort Smith sedition trial =

Trial of white supremacists (US, 1988)

The Fort Smith sedition trial was a 1988 trial of fourteen white supremacists accused of plotting to overthrow the United States federal government and conspiring to assassinate federal officials. The fourteen defendants were acquitted after a two-month trial.

== Background ==
In 1983, Robert Jay Mathews founded a revolutionary white supremacist terrorist group known as The Order (or The Silent Brotherhood) on his farm in Metaline, Washington. The group was formed with the goal of overthrowing the United States Federal Government, which they called "Zionist Occupation Government" (ZOG), and to establish an all-white nation in the Pacific Northwest. Mathews recruited several men from Aryan Nations to join the group. The Order began robbing banks and armored cars in order to finance their planned revolution. Members of the group assassinated Jewish radio talk show host Alan Berg outside his Denver home on June 18, 1984.

Mathews was killed in a shootout with FBI agents on Whidbey Island on December 8, 1984, and most other members of The Order were arrested thereafter. Two members of The Order, David Lane and Bruce Pierce, were convicted of involvement in Berg's death. Several other members, including Richard Scutari and Andrew Barnhill, were given lengthy sentences for racketeering.

During the period when The Order was active, another white supremacist group known as The Covenant, The Sword, and the Arm of the Lord (CSA) was also plotting to overthrow the US government. The group was headquartered on a heavily armed and fortified compound in Arkansas and they had established ties with other white supremacists such as Aryan Nations leader Richard G. Butler and Christian Identity and Ku Klux Klan leader Robert E. Miles. CSA members allegedly plotted to poison the water supplies of New York City and Washington, D.C., with sodium cyanide. One CSA member named Richard Wayne Snell assassinated a black Arkansas State Trooper and a white pawnshop owner he mistakenly thought was Jewish. Snell was ultimately convicted, sentenced to death and executed for these crimes on April 19, 1995.

Following Snell's arrest, the FBI and ATF plotted a siege of the CSA compound on weapons violations. The siege began on April 19, 1985, and ended peacefully three days later with the arrest of CSA leader Jim Ellison. Ellison was later sentenced to 20 years in federal prison on racketeering charges.

As the FBI investigated The Order's crimes, informants began providing them with information allegedly outlining The Order's ties to several prominent white supremacists, such as Butler, Miles, Texas KKK leader Louis Beam, Tom Metzger of White Aryan Resistance, William L. Pierce (no relation to Bruce Pierce) of the National Alliance, and Glenn Miller of the White Patriot Party. The FBI alleged that The Order's crimes, as well as other crimes committed by other white supremacists, were coordinated by prominent leaders of the white supremacist movement and that some of the leaders were continuing to plot more crimes including the bombings of several federal courthouses.

== Trial ==
In April 1987, fourteen white supremacists were formally indicted in Fort Smith, Arkansas on charges of seditious conspiracy, transporting stolen money, and conspiring to commit murder. Barnhill, Beam, Butler, Lane, Miles, Bruce Pierce, Scutari, Snell, Robert Neil Smalley, and Ardie McBrearty were charged with seditious conspiracy while Snell, David Michael McGuire, William and Ivan Wade, and Lambert Miller were charged with conspiracy to commit murder. Barnhill and Scutari also faced charges of transporting stolen money.

The trial began on February 16, 1988. The prosecution's case relied heavily on the testimonies of Ellison and Miller. The defense contended that Ellison and Miller had motive to lie about the alleged conspiracy in order to receive reduced prison sentences on other charges. The defense also attacked Ellison's character by revealing his delusions of grandeur and that he was a polygamist. The charges against Smalley were dismissed due to lack of evidence in March 1988, and the remaining thirteen defendants were acquitted of all charges on April 7.

=== The defendants ===
- Louis Ray Beam, of Houston, Texas
- Robert E. Miles, of Cohoctah, Michigan
- Richard G. Butler, of Hayden Lake, Idaho
- Richard Joseph Scutari, of New York
- Andrew Virgil Barnhill, of Fort Lauderdale, Florida
- Bruce Carroll Pierce, of Metaline Falls, Washington
- Ardie McBrearty, of Gentry, Arkansas
- David Eden Lane, of Denver, Colorado
- Richard Wayne Snell, of Muse, Oklahoma
- Lambert Miller, of Springfield, Missouri
- David Michael McGuire, of Greenville, Illinois
- Ivan Ray Wade, of Smithville, Arkansas
- William Wade (father of Ivan Wade), also of Smithville
- Robert Neil Smalley, of Fort Smith

== Aftermath ==
Many white supremacists celebrated the verdict, with Beam stating "ZOG has suffered a terrible defeat here today". Nevertheless, six of the defendants remained incarcerated on other charges. Snell remained on death row, whereas Barnhill, Lane, McBrearty, Pierce, and Scutari still had to serve lengthy prison sentences.

Glenn Miller would kill three people in two shootings at Jewish community centers in Overland Park, Kansas on April 13, 2014. In 2015, he was sentenced to death for these murders. He died on death row in 2021.

Snell, 64, was executed by lethal injection in Arkansas on April 19, 1995. He was executed on the same day the Alfred P. Murrah Federal Building was bombed in Oklahoma City. Snell, Ellison, and another CSA member had previously plotted to bomb the Murrah building in 1983. Some conspiracy theorists and former members of the CSA, including Ellison's second-in-command Kerry Noble, alleged that the Oklahoma City Bombing was meant to coincide with Snell's execution. An Arkansas prison official reported that Snell laughed while watching news of the bombing in the hours prior to his execution. Noble also alleged that the bombing was a continuation of The Order's war.
