= The Covenant, the Sword, and the Arm of the Lord =

American far-right militant group active during the 1970s and 80s

The Covenant, The Sword, and the Arm of the Lord (CSA)
- The group adopted the USAEUR's shoulder sleeve insignia, which can be seen on CSA uniforms.
- Formation: 1971
- Dissolved: April 19, 1985
- Type: White nationalism Christian Identity; Survivalism
- Location: United States
- Leader: James Dennis Ellison
- Second-in-command: Kerry Wayne Noble
- In Charge of Internal Security: Kent Yates
- Affiliations: The Order, Aryan Nations, Elohim City

The Covenant, the Sword, and the Arm of the Lord (CSA) was a far-right survivalist anti-government militia that advocated for Christian Identity and was active in the United States during the 1970s and early 1980s. The CSA developed from a Baptist congregation, the Zarephath-Horeb Community Church, which was founded in 1971 in Pontiac, Missouri. Over time, Zarephath-Horeb evolved into an extremist militant group and it was rechristened the CSA. The group operated at a large compound in northern Arkansas, known as "the Farm.”

In April 1985, federal and state law enforcement officials who had been investigating the CSA for weapons violations and terrorist acts carried out a three-day siege of the compound. Following a peaceful resolution, officers arrested and later convicted the CSA's top leaders, eventually causing the organization to dissolve.

== Leadership ==
The founder of the CSA was James Ellison. He was jailed in federal prison along with Kerry Noble. Robert G. Millar became one of Ellison's spiritual advisers and also founded Elohim City. Ellison was mentored by Richard Girnt Butler, founder of Aryan Nations, and Robert E. Miles, founder of the Mountain Church of Jesus Christ the Savior in Cohoctah, Michigan. Both extreme right-wing leaders taught and practiced the theology of Christian Identity, a belief system which is included on the FBI's watch list of extremist religions. Ellison had close ties to the Ku Klux Klan and Aryan Nations, based in Hayden Lake, Idaho, and led by Butler, who was described as "the glue of the Aryan Nations movement in the Northwest, if not the country" by the supervisor of the Inland Northwest Joint Terrorism Task Force. Miles operated a prison ministry and published a newsletter. After Ellison was released from prison, he moved to Elohim City, where he married Millar's granddaughter.

The CSA community's Council of Elders was influenced and mentored by many outside sources. The nine-man council deliberated on the spiritual meaning and the direction of CSA activities. Jim Ellison, Kerry Noble, and William Wade were the only known members of the council.

== Members ==
In June 1982, the CSA had an estimated 90 to 120 members, including men, women, and children. By April 1984, there were fewer than 70 members.

Other known members of The Covenant, The Sword, and the Arm of the Lord include:

- James Rolston
- Steven (Stephen) Scott
- William "Bill" Thomas
- Mitchell L. Rolston (alleged member)
- Leonard Ginter
- Richard Wayne Snell
- Arthur Russell
- Timothy Wayne Russell
- Rudy Loewen
- David Giles
- Frank Kumnick (alleged member)
- Randall Rader (former member)
- Ardie McBrearty (former member)
- Andrew "Andy" Barnhill

== Purpose ==
The CSA believed that doomsday was imminent, and a 224-acre compound in Elijah, Missouri that it acquired from Campus Crusade became a community for its members. There it trained its members in paramilitary operations.

Like other prominent antisemitic groups, it called the United States government ZOG, short for Zionist Occupied Government. In 1982, the military leader of the group, who ran its "End Time Overcomer Survival" training camps and used the name Randall Rader during his stay at the CSA's compound, left the group along with 30 of his followers in a rift with Ellison, following the latter's attempt to take a second wife, and he joined the newly forming group The Order in Idaho. The CSA initially professed that the United States government would dissolve due to its corruption, whereas The Order advocated revolution. However, in July 1983, The CSA published a manifesto called A.T.T.A.C.K. (Aryan Tactical Treaty for the Advancement of Christ's Kingdom), which declared war on the government.

== Operations ==
CSA assassins monitored the homes of their targets, practiced mock assassinations of these targets with scoped rifles, and practiced attacks in a mock residential training facility which was known as Silhouette City. The 224-acre property on Bull Shoals Lake in Marion County, Arkansas that the CSA operated from until its collapse in 1985 was purchased by Ellison from the Campus Crusade for Christ in 1976. In 1983, financially suffering, especially after Randall Rader's defection to the Order, the CSA stopped making payments on the mortgage, and on December 20, the bank foreclosed, selling the property back to the Campus Crusade. However, the group squatted on the land, mounting regular armed patrols in an attempt to intimidate the local sheriff, who continuously delayed their eviction. The perimeter of the CSA's compound had 100, 200, and 300-yard (270 m) indicator plates nailed to trees to allow the defenders to adjust their sights accordingly to engage attackers. The central rallying point in the event of an attack was a concrete bunkhouse that housed communications radios next to the 95-foot (29 m) tower, which was constructed for defense. The perimeter of the compound had built-in bunkers for one to three men, and each bunker was numbered as a post and it was also assigned to individuals as an area of responsibility.

The line infantryman carried a Ruger Mini-14 .223 Remington rifle. As in the early days of the United States Marine Corps, the squads were set up in four-man fire teams. One man in each fire team carried a Heckler & Koch Model 91 rifle in .308 caliber. These rifles had been modified via a technique that the organization sold to "brother groups," converting the rifles to an illegal selective fire weapon (either capable of firing single shots or fully automatic). The members of the Elite "A" Team wore black clothing and they possessed some fairly sophisticated weapons, such as .22 caliber Ruger target pistols which were fitted with integral silencers, and several MAC-10 submachineguns in both 9 mm and .45 ACP, also with attached suppressors. These men trained in the covert aspects of military action and they were required to be the core of the defense initiative.

The Bureau of Alcohol, Tobacco, and Firearms (ATF) later determined that the CSA had obtained 155 Krugerrands, one live light antitank rocket, 94 long guns, 30 handguns, 35 sawed-off shotguns, and machine guns, one heavy machine gun, and a quantity of C-4 explosives.

Within "Silhouette City", the CSA also ran a boot camp-style program which was known as the End Time Overcomer Survival Training School – a school which was attended by Order member Randall Rader. Here, the group trained an estimated 1,500 like-minded Christian Identity adherents in combat techniques and paramilitary exercises. The facility was festooned with targets which crudely caricatured Blacks, Jews, and police officers who wore the Star of David in-lieu of badges. After they completed their training, newly trained militants would leave and join militia groups which were similar to the CSA or they would found their own militia groups.

The CSA and its paramilitary arm taught basic pistol and rifle use as well as personal home defense, rural and urban warfare, weapons proficiency, general military fieldcraft, Christian martial arts, and natural wilderness survival.

In 1983, CSA members William Thomas, Richard Wayne Snell and Steven Scott attempted to dynamite a natural gas pipeline that crossed the Red River on its way from the Gulf of Mexico to Chicago. This terrorist attack was attempted as part of the group's A.T.T.A.C.K. operations. According to Kerry Noble, the group predicted that this terrorist attack would result in riots due to the fact that it would be perpetrated during the winter. However, the trio was unsuccessful in its attempt to carry out the attack.

The CSA had links to other radical organizations, including the Aryan Brotherhood, the Mountain Church, and The Order, all of which were white supremacist organizations that advocated the violent overthrow of the United States Government. Many of the members of these organizations were seen traveling in and out of the compound, and after a search of the compound was conducted, several stolen vehicles, including one which belonged to The Order, were recovered.

According to a report which was published by the California Department of Justice, the Pagans Motorcycle Club provided the CSA with training in booby trap devices and survival techniques in return for weapons and ammunition.

In 1983, the CSA declared war on the US government. However, most of its attacks were on civilian targets, starting with a failed arson attempt on the Springfield Metropolitan Community Church. Soon afterward, things began to go downhill for the organization when Richard Snell, an alleged member, was arrested for killing an African-American police officer. Snell was later tied to the killing of a gun store owner in 1981, obtaining and using the same gun, the serial number of which had been removed by the CSA armorer, Kent Yates. The killing of the gun store owner was part of a campaign of property theft that the CSA had waged in an attempt to recover the income which it lost when it constructed its training camps. Using its proximity to the state's border, the CSA hoped that it could conceal its activities by committing crimes in Missouri and crossing the border back into Arkansas. Yates was arrested on July 13, 1984, on an outstanding warrant out of New Mexico for firearms violations in Farmington. Later, he was also charged and convicted of manufacturing and modifying weapons for the CSA.

After the incident with Snell, the FBI began to seek ways to infiltrate the CSA's compound and stop the organization. Under Arkansas state law, its agents obtained warrants to arrest Ellison, the leader of the CSA, for multiple firearms violations. Later, the FBI claimed that at all times, it had an "inside man" in the CSA.

== Siege ==
On 16 April 1985, the FBI obtained a warrant to search the CSA's compound.

Beginning on 19 April 1985, the FBI and the ATF, led by the FBI's Hostage Rescue Team (HRT), positioned around 300 federal agents in Elijah. The operation needed to be kept secret, but doing so was not easy in the small community. However, the FBI and ATF agents took advantage of Pontiac being a common destination for anglers by pretending to be fishermen and registering at different motels near the various fishing destinations. On the morning of 19 April, they moved in and surrounded the CSA compound, putting some of their agents in fishing boats in an attempt to seal off the lakeside area of the compound. There they waited, until a few hours later when two guards emerged from the compound. They appeared to be unaware of the presence of the officers and walked towards a sniper hold-out until an officer yelled commands to return to the compound to the guards, with which the guards complied. Later, an unnamed individual emerged from the compound, talked to the federal agents and informed Ellison that the FBI agents were outside and willing to negotiate his surrender and the emptying of the compound. Ellison emerged later. FBI agents had expected that he would not go down without a firefight, but the FBI negotiators convinced him that the CSA would certainly lose if a firefight broke out. Interviewed on March 9, 1993, by KXAS-5 News, during the Waco standoff, Kerry Noble asserted that the CSA was expecting to be relieved by other far-right groups and acts of God. When neither manifested itself, the group's morale and its willingness to resist were severely affected. FBI negotiators convinced Ellison that they wanted peaceful cooperation, and he asked his spiritual adviser, assumed to be Millar, to come to the compound and instruct him. The individual was flown to the area and he seemed eager to convince Ellison to stand down. They allowed the individual to enter the compound, and the FBI instructed him to call in every 30 minutes and report on how the negotiations were going.

U.S. Attorney Asa Hutchinson, who later successfully prosecuted Ellison and other leaders of the CSA, put on an FBI flak jacket and entered the compound to join the negotiations, leading to a peaceful conclusion to the armed stand-off. After several calls during which more time was requested, early on the morning of the fourth day of the siege, Arkansas State Police entered the compound and escorted the remaining members out without bloodshed. Women and children had previously been evacuated to nearby motels.

== Charges ==
In federal court, Ellison and most of the CSA's leaders were charged with illegal weapons possession and racketeering. In September 1985, Ellison, Kerry Noble, and four other CSA members (Gary Stone, Timothy Russell, Rudy Loewen, and David Giles) were sentenced to serve lengthy federal prison terms. In an Arkansas federal court, a seventh CSA member, Stephen Scott, pleaded guilty to charges that he dynamited a natural gas pipeline near Fulton, Arkansas in 1983, and as a result, he was also sent to prison. Ex-CSA member Kent Yates also pleaded guilty to a charge of conspiring to make and transfer automatic weapons silencers.

Ellison received the maximum sentence of 20 years in prison after he was convicted on federal racketeering and weapons charges. However, in 1987, Ellison was released after he agreed to testify against the leader and six senior members of Aryan Nations. All seven men were arrested and indicted on charges of sedition. The jury found all of the defendants not guilty on all of the charges. Upon his release from federal prison, Ellison moved to Elohim City.

Richard Wayne Snell, the man who shot and killed the police officer and a pawn shop owner, was sentenced to death by lethal injection. He was executed on April 19, 1995, the day of the Oklahoma City bombing.

== Proposed ties to the Oklahoma City bombing ==
There are several claims which state that the 1995 bombing of the Alfred P. Murrah Federal Building was tied to the "New Day" teachings of Elohim City. However, no proof of such a connection has been established. Elohim City was assembled to gather "prophets of the New Day". Elohim City's Leader Robert G. Millar envisioned himself to be the "Shepherd of Shepherds" who was traveling to numerous alternative societies, many of which were and are still communes. His ambition was to unite these underground organizations. He appeared at the Padanaram Settlement, in southern Indiana on several occasions, but contrary to reports, the members of the Padanaram Settlement did not concur with the radical callings of either Millar or Ellison, who made two appearances there. "The Valley" was and still is more known for being a cultural hub for artists and philosophers, and until roughly 2003, it operated a sawmill.

Timothy McVeigh, who was convicted and executed for perpetrating the Oklahoma City bombing, had no association with the CSA and he had just enlisted in the U.S. Army when the CSA's compound was besieged and the CSA was broken up. The Oklahoma City bombing occurred exactly on the 10th anniversary of the start of the siege of the CSA's compound in 1985. The most plausible link is the fact that Richard Wayne Snell, who was executed on the day of the Oklahoma City bombing, had planned to perpetrate a similar attack on the Murrah building in 1983 after he became upset with the Internal Revenue Service. Additionally, Snell was heard taunting jailers when he stated that something drastic would happen on the day of his execution. However, McVeigh stated that he chose the date of 19 April because he wanted to perpetrate the Oklahoma City bombing on the second anniversary of the violent end of the Waco siege. McVeigh had traveled to Waco during the 51-day siege, and he cited it and the siege at Ruby Ridge in 1992 as the events which primarily motivated him to perpetrate the bombing.

In fact, the single incident in which the CSA was involved, the robbery of a pawn shop in Springfield, Missouri, was foiled by a CSA member on the orders of Jim Ellison, unknown to Wayne Snell, who headed up the plan. During this event, Ellison saw a "sign from God", an event which he interpreted to mean that they should not carry out the attempt; he was referring to this attack, rather than his plan to attack the Oklahoma City Federal Building.

The death knell of the CSA was its attempt to kill FBI special agent Jack Knox, the lead agent who was assigned to investigate the group; Asa Hutchinson, the federal prosecutor; and the federal judge who presided over the affair that brought about the eventual action against Gordon Kahl, a tax protester and a member of the Posse Comitatus, by federal agents at CSA member Leonard Ginter's home (called 'The Bunker', due to the fact that it was constructed with concrete which was covered with earth). Ellison revered Kahl as a hero. Like McVeigh, Kahl was a decorated American soldier; Kahl earned a Silver Star in World War II, and McVeigh earned a Bronze Star in the first Gulf War – Desert Storm.

== Media ==
In 2013, Kerry Noble appeared on the Investigation Discovery show Dangerous Persuasions and talked about his time with the group. He was also interviewed on an episode of Brainwashed which was broadcast on the Slice Network in Canada and during the interview, he discussed his time with the CSA.

The Discovery Channel crime series The FBI Files' sixth season featured an episode whose topic was the CSA. The episode reveals the details of the federal investigation into the group, the 1985 siege, and the aftermath of it. The episode originally aired on 10 December 2002.
