= Harold Wallace Rosenthal =

American terrorist victim (1947–1976)

Harold Wallace Rosenthal (November 2, 1947 – August 11, 1976) was a senior aide to Senator Jacob K. Javits (R-NY). Rosenthal was killed in a terrorist attack in Istanbul, Turkey.

== Career ==
Rosenthal graduated from Cambridge University and Harvard University graduate school, both on scholarships. After working for Congressman (later Governor) Hugh Carey (D-NY) he moved to the office of Senator Walter Mondale (D-MN) where he directed the senator's legislative agenda. After a stint at the Rockefeller Brothers Fund, Rosenthal returned to the Senate to work as a senior aide to Jacob K. Javits of New York.

== Death ==
On August 11, 1976, Rosenthal was one of four people murdered in a terrorist attack at the El Al gate in Istanbul, Turkey. Other victims included Yutaka Hirano, a tour guide from Japan, Ernest Eliash from Petach Tikvah and Shlomo Weisbachs along with over 20 injured. An American woman, Margaret Shearer was injured with a bullet in her ankle. Two captured attackers identified themselves to Turkish police as Mohamed Mehdi and Mohamed Husein al-Rashid of the Popular Front for the Liberation of Palestine.

In 1977, the Harold Rosenthal Fellowship in International Relations was established in his memory.

== Purported Interview ==
In 1978, a pamphlet entitled The Hidden Tyranny included an interview conducted by Walter White purportedly with Rosenthal that claimed Jewish Americans had implemented a Protocols of the Elders of Zion-style plan to take over the world. The pamphlet was republished in the 1990s and distributed in Idaho by the 11th Hour Remnant Messenger, funded by wealthy entrepreneurs Vincent Bertollini and Carl E. Story. The Anti-Defamation League has called it "a fabricated document" and questioned why the author would "wait to first publish the booklet until 1978, 18 months after he had spoken with Rosenthal, who was murdered in 1976." Tom Metzger reported in the White Aryan Resistance website "that interview never took place. Walter White operated free and loose on some subjects, like this one... that interview is bogus." Daniel Levitas in his book The Terrorist Next Door: The Militia Movement and the Radical Right attributed the bogus interview to White's wife, Opal Tanner White, an aide to Gerald L. K. Smith, writing "since Rosenthal was dead, White was free to attribute anything she wished—however scurrilous or hateful—to the onetime Javits aide."

== See also ==
- Sabena Flight 571 hijacking
- El Al Flight 426 hijacking
- El Al Flight 253 attack
- Antisemitic canard
