= White power (disambiguation) =

White power is a white supremacist slogan and political ideology. White power or White Power may also refer to:

- White Power (book), a book by George Lincoln Rockwell
- White Power (EP), an EP by Skrewdriver
- White Power Report, a white supremacist magazine
- White Power, the newspaper of the National Socialist White People's Party
- White Power, a newsletter by Russell Veh
- White Power Publications, an American publishing company operated by George P. Dietz

== See also ==
- White power symbol, a hand sign
- White power skinhead, a white supremacist subculture
- White power music, racist music
