= James Ellison (white supremacist) =

American white supremacist (1940–2021)

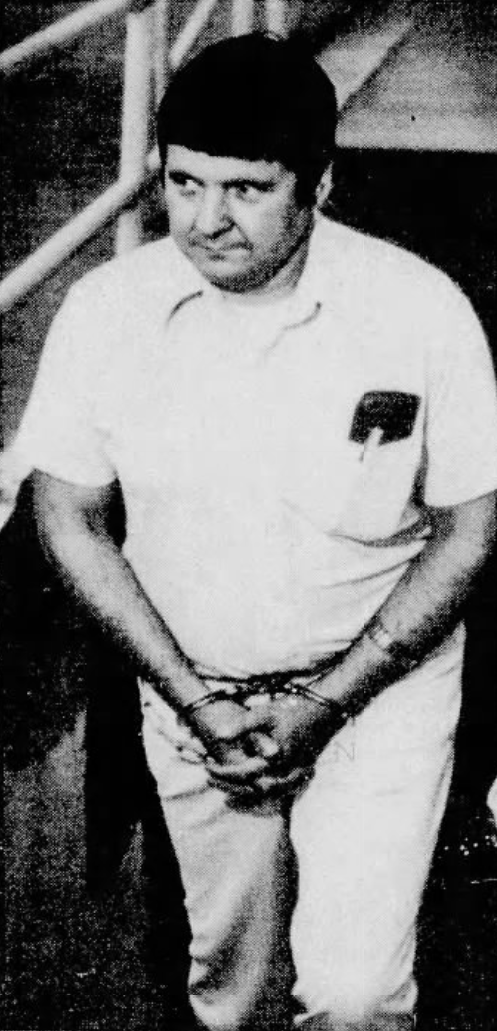
- Ellison in custody in 1985
- Born: June 18, 1940; Illinois, U.S.
- Died: March 27, 2021 (aged 80); Elohim City, Adair County, Oklahoma, U.S.
- Other name: Jim Ellison
- Movement: U.S. Militia Movements, Survivalist, Christian Identity
- Spouse: Angela Millar

James Dennis Ellison (June 18, 1940 – March 2021) was an American white supremacist from San Antonio, Texas. In 1971, he founded the radical organization The Covenant, The Sword, and the Arm of the Lord (CSA). Ellison purchased a 250-acre (1.0 km^{2}) strip of land near Elijah, Missouri, and he constructed his compound on it. He was also a close associate of Richard Wayne Snell.

== Leadership of the CSA ==
James Dennis Ellison was born in Illinois on June 18, 1940. He was a polygamist who spent time in federal prison with his "high priest" Kerry Noble. Robert G. Millar, the founder of Elohim City, Oklahoma, became one of his spiritual advisers. He was also mentored by Richard Girnt Butler, founder of Aryan Nations and Robert E. Miles, founder of The Mountain Church in Cohoctah, Michigan. Both extreme right leaders taught and practiced Christian Identity, a religion which is included on the FBI's watchlist because the FBI classifies it as an "extremist religion". Ellison had very close ties to the Ku Klux Klan and the Northern Idaho-based group Aryan Nations, led by Richard Butler. Miles operated a very active prison ministry and published a newsletter. Most of the readers were members of several violent white supremacist groups, the most notable one being the Aryan Brotherhood. After Ellison was released from prison, he moved to Elohim City, where he married Millar's granddaughter.

== Siege at the CSA's compound: April 19, 1985 ==
The ATF set up what is thought to have been a group of around 300 federal agents in Elijah, having them pose as fishermen because the area was a common destination for anglers. On the morning of April 19, 1985, they moved in with a warrant for the arrest of Ellison and surrounded the CSA's compound. Some of the agents stayed in fishing boats in order to seal off the lakeside area of the compound. There they waited, until a few hours later when two guards emerged from the compound. They appeared to be unaware of the presence of the officers, and they walked towards a sniper hold-out, until an officer yelled commands to return to the compound; the guards complied. Later, an unnamed individual emerged from the compound and talked with the federal agents, reporting to Ellison that the FBI agents were outside and willing to negotiate his surrender and the emptying of the compound. Ellison emerged later, and the FBI agents felt that he would not go down without a firefight. FBI negotiators convinced him that the CSA would certainly lose if a gun battle broke out. They convinced him that they wanted peaceful cooperation, and he asked that his spiritual adviser, assumed to be Robert G. Millar, come to the compound to instruct him. The individual was flown to the area and he seemed eager to convince Ellison to stand down, understanding that there would be certain bloodshed otherwise. They allowed the individual to enter the compound, and the FBI agents instructed him to call in every 30 minutes and report on how the negotiations were going.

US Attorney and future Arkansas governor Asa Hutchinson, who would later go on to successfully prosecute Ellison and other leaders of the CSA, put on an FBI flak jacket and entered the compound in order to personally join in the negotiations, ultimately leading to a peaceful conclusion to the armed standoff. After several calls during which more time was requested, early on the morning of the fourth day of the siege, Ellison, his command, and all of the males in the compound emerged, and surrendered themselves to authorities.

== Charges ==
Ellison and most of the CSA's leaders were charged with illegal weapons possession in federal court, and Ellison received the maximum sentence of 20 years in prison. Ellison was convicted on federal racketeering and weapons charges and was sentenced to 20 years in prison. Ellison was released in 1987 after he agreed to testify against the leader and six senior members of Aryan Nations, which was rumored to have been strengthened by Robert Miles during his time in federal prison. Upon his release from federal prison, Ellison moved to Elohim City, Oklahoma.

== Personal life ==
Ellison died of heart failure on March 27, 2021. He was 80 years old and still lived in Elohim City.
