= The Terrorist Next Door =

The Terrorist Next Door may refer to:

- The Terrorist Next Door (novel), by Sheldon Siegel
- The Terrorist Next Door (Levitas book), by Daniel Levitas
