= Times Record =

Times Record or The Times Record may refer to the following newspapers:

- Southwest Times Record, published in Fort Smith, Arkansas
- The Times Record (Illinois), published in Aledo, Illinois
- The Times Record (Maine), published in Brunswick, Maine
- The Times-Record (Maryland), published in Denton, Maryland
- Times-Record (North Dakota), published in Valley City, North Dakota
- Times Record & Roane County Reporter, published in Spencer, West Virginia
- Times Record News, published in Wichita Falls, Texas
- The Record, published in Troy, New York

== See also ==
- Times Recorder
