= George P. Dietz =

German-born American neo-Nazi publisher

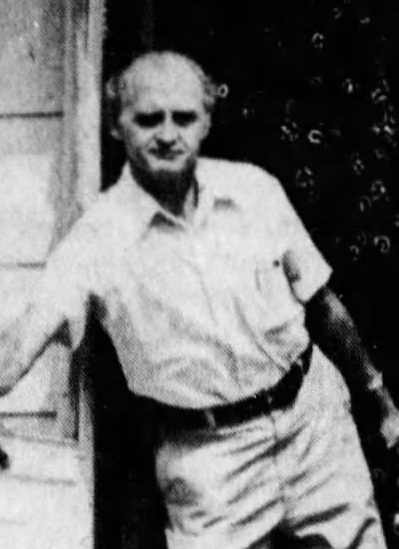
- Dietz at his home in 1980
- Born: February 22, 1928; Kassel, Hesse-Nassau, Weimar Republic
- Died: April 23, 2007 (aged 79); Spencer, West Virginia, U.S.
- Resting place: Eventide Cemetery, Spencer, West Virginia
- Political party: American Party of West Virginia (1974-197?)
- Spouse: Elsbeth "Betty" Dietz

George Phillip Dietz (February 27, 1928 – April 23, 2007) was a German-born American publisher and writer known for his far-right and neo-Nazi views. The Anti-Defamation League described him in 1980 as running "the largest anti-Semitic propaganda mill in the United States."

== Biography ==
Dietz was born on April 23, 1928, in the Weimar Republic. His father Heinrich Dietz was a member of the Sturmabteilung, and during the Third Reich, Dietz was part of the Hitler Youth. In May 1957, he emigrated to the United States and became a U.S. citizen in 1962 while living in New Jersey. Later, he moved to Liverpool in 1971 and then to Spencer in 1998, where he worked as a real estate agent and owned a printing press. He was married to Elsbeth “Betty” Winter on December 18, 1948. They had two children together.

In late May, 1974 he joined the John Birch Society and started an American Opinion Bookstore in Reedy. With that he started to published the Liberty Bell that took part of the Kanawha County Textbook War using the JBS arguments of Communist conspiracy to promote multiracialism. In 1975 he left the JBS due to antisemitic issues and the Liberty Bell started to publish neo-Nazi material. Then he called Robert Welch a "Talmudic tool for the destruction of the White people of America". He ran both the Liberty Bell Publications and White Power Publications companies. In May 1977, Simon Wiesenthal revealed that Dietz, along with 80 other neo-Nazis, was linked to the Patriotic Legal Fund, an organization that financed Nazi criminals who were fugitives from justice.

He also started to published the neo-Nazi publication White Power Report, and the German neo-Nazi magazine Der Schulungsbrief through Liberty Bell Publications in which he also published antisemitic, neo-Nazi and Holocaust denier books. Among the books Dietz distributed were army training manuals and works by Adolf Hitler, George Lincoln Rockwell, Francis Parker Yockey, Friedrich Nietzsche, and Ezra Pound. He also distributed Nazi memorabilia. In March 1984 he created the first white supremacist bulletin board system called Liberty Bell Net, late he helped Louis Beam establish his BBS Aryan Liberty Network of the Aryan Nations and later he helped Tom Metzger to establish White Aryan Resistance bulletin.

A West German parliamentary commission investigating Nazi propaganda found that 95 percent of such material in the country came from the United States. Simon Wiesenthal named Dietz and Gary Lauck of Lincoln, Nebraska, as the main sources. A West German embassy official said that U.S. authorities had told him nothing could be done, since Dietz was not violating American law, whereas possession of Nazi propaganda was illegal in West Germany.

Dietz died on April 23, 2007, in Spencer, West Virginia, and was buried at Eventide Cemetery.

== See also ==
- Hans Schmidt (Waffen-SS)

== Works cited ==
- "Obituary". Times Record & Roane County Reporter. 2006. pp. 6A – via Google News.
- Berlet, Chip (2001). "When hate went online". New England Sociological Association.
- Goodrick-Clarke, Nicholas (2001). Black Sun: Aryan Cults, Esoteric Nazism and the Politics of Identity. New York University Press. ISBN 978-0-8147-3124-6.
- Levitas, Daniel (2004). The Terrorist Next Door: The Militia Movement and the Radical Right. St. Martin's Press. ISBN 9781429941808.
- Renfrew, Barry (1980). "Nazi Germany is alive and well--in the U.S." The Spokesman-Review. p. E6 – via Google News Archive.
- Simpson, Patricia; Druxes, Helga (2015). Digital Media Strategies of the Far Right in Europe and the United States. Lexington Books. ISBN 978-0739198827.
- Sunshine, Spencer (2024). Neo-Nazi Terrorism and Countercultural Fascism: The Origins and Afterlife of James Mason's Siege. New York: Routledge. ISBN 978-0-429-57601-0.
- Winter, Aaron (2019). "Online Hate: From the Far-Right to the 'Alt-Right', and from the. Margins to the Mainstream". In Emily, Harmer; Lumsden, Karen (eds.). Online Othering: Exploring Digital Violence and Discrimination on the Web. Springer International Publishing. ISBN 9783030126339.
