= Alfred P. Murrah Federal Building =

Building in Oklahoma, US (bombed 1995)

- The Alfred P. Murrah Federal Building in 1977

- Location within Oklahoma Location within the United States
- Alternative names: Alfred P. Murrah Building

General information
- Status: Demolished
- Location: 200 Northwest 5th Street, Oklahoma City, Oklahoma, United States
- Coordinates: 35°28′22″N 97°31′01″W
- Opened: March 2, 1977; 49 years ago
- Demolished: May 23, 1995; 31 years ago (bombed on April 19, 1995)
- Owner: United States federal government

The Alfred P. Murrah Federal Building was a United States federal government complex located at 200 N.W. 5th Street in downtown Oklahoma City, Oklahoma. On April 19, 1995, the building was the target of the Oklahoma City bombing by Timothy McVeigh and Terry Nichols, which ultimately killed 168 people and injured 684 others. A third of the building collapsed seconds after the truck bomb detonated. The remains were demolished a month after the attack, and the Oklahoma City National Memorial was built on the site.

== Construction and use ==
The building was designed by architects Stephen H. Horton and Wendell Locke of Locke, Wright and Associates and constructed by J.W. Bateson Company of Dallas, Texas, using reinforced concrete in 1977 at a cost of $14.5 million. The building, named for federal judge Alfred P. Murrah, an Oklahoma native, opened on March 2, 1977.

By the 1990s, the building contained regional offices for the Social Security Administration, the U.S. Department of Housing and Urban Development, the United States Secret Service, the Department of Veterans Affairs vocational rehabilitation counseling center, the Drug Enforcement Administration (D.E.A.), and the Bureau of Alcohol, Tobacco, and Firearms (ATF). It also contained recruiting offices for the U.S. military. It housed approximately 550 employees. It also housed America's Kids, a children's day care center.

== Prior bombing plots ==
On October 14, 1977, a few hours before a dedication ceremony at the Murrah Federal Building was scheduled to occur, an unidentified man called the offices of the American Elevator Company and said that a bomb was going to detonate in "the federal building". The Murrah Building and two other federal offices in Oklahoma City were evacuated, but no explosives were found. The dedication ceremony went on as planned later that day. A similar threat was received on September 22, 1980, again leading to the brief evacuation of all three federal office buildings in the complex.

In October 1983, members of the Christian militia group the Covenant, the Sword, and the Arm of the Lord (CSA), including founder James Ellison and Richard Snell plotted to park "a van or trailer in front of the Federal Building and blow it up with rockets detonated by a timer." While the CSA was building a rocket launcher to attack the building, the ordnance accidentally detonated in a member's hands. The CSA took this as divine intervention and called off the planned attack. Convicted of murder in Arkansas in an unrelated case, Snell was executed on April 19, 1995, the same day the bombing of the federal building was carried out, after U.S. Supreme Court justice Clarence Thomas declined to hear further appeal.

== Destruction ==
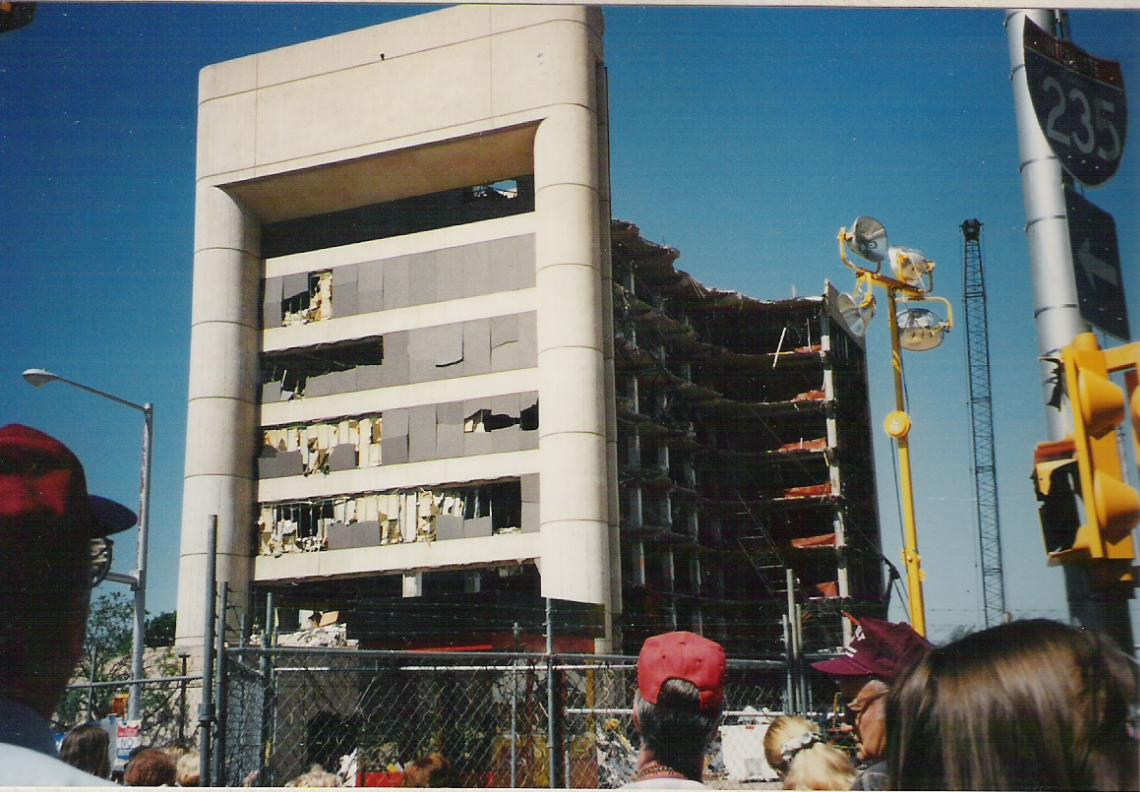
Murrah Building during the recovery effort

At 9:02 a.m. local time on April 19, 1995, a Ryder rental truck, containing approximately 7,000 pounds (3,175 kg) of ammonium nitrate fertilizer, nitromethane, and diesel fuel was detonated in front of the building, destroying a third of it and causing severe damage to several other buildings located nearby. As a result, 168 people were killed, including 19 children, and over 800 others were injured. It remains the deadliest domestic terrorist attack, with the most property damage, in the U.S.

Timothy McVeigh, a U.S. Army veteran, was found guilty of the attack in a jury trial and sentenced to death. He was executed in 2001. A co-conspirator, Terry Nichols, another Army veteran, is serving multiple life sentences in ADX Florence, a federal supermax prison. Third and fourth subjects Michael Fortier and his wife, Lori, assisted in the plot. They testified against both McVeigh and Nichols in exchange for a 12-year prison term for Michael and immunity for Lori. Michael was released into the witness protection program in January 2006.

McVeigh said that he bombed the building on the second anniversary of the Waco siege in 1993 to retaliate for U.S. government actions there and at the siege at Ruby Ridge. However, it is also rumored that the bombing was connected to Covenant, the Sword, and the Arm of the Lord (CSA) white supremacist Richard Snell, who was coincidentally executed in Arkansas the day of the bombing and who also "predicted" that a bombing would happen on the day of his execution. Fort Smith-based federal prosecutor Steven Snyder told the FBI in May 1995 that Snell previously expressed a desire to target the Murrah building in 1983 as revenge for the IRS raiding his home. Before his execution, McVeigh said that he did not know a day care center was in the building and that, had he known, "It might have given me pause to switch targets." The FBI said that he scouted the interior of the building in December 1994 and likely knew of the day care center before the bombing.

== Artwork in the building ==
Many works of art were in the building when it was destroyed in the Oklahoma City bombing. The Oklahoma City National Memorial displays art that survived the bombing. Nineteen pieces of art recovered from the Murrah Building are on permanent display on the first floor of the University of Central Oklahoma's Max Chambers Library. These pieces include:

- Monolith IV, sculpture by Franklin Simons
- Morning Mist, photograph by David Halpern
- Charon's Sentinels, photograph by David Halpern
- North of Cunningham's, photograph by Albert Durr Edgar
- Cowboy in Coffee Shop, photograph by Curt Clyne
- Morning in Taos, fiber art by Betty Jo Kidson
- Sun Form, fiber sculpture by Dena Madole
- Storm, sculpture by Richard Davis
- Double Layers, fiber art by Jane Knight
- 31 Flavors, fiber sculpture by Sally Anderson
- Loyal Creek, clay sculptures by Carol Whitney
- October, fiber art by Joyce Pardington
- Precise Notations, tapestry by Bud Stalnaker
- A Fallen Oak Tree, wood mural by James Strickland
- Carnival, tapestry by Anna Burgess
- A Fur Piece, mixed media by Rebecca Wheeler
- Oklahoma Quilt, by Terrie Mangat
- Canyon Wall Number 2, fiber art by Joyce Pardington
- Sunburst, fiber art by Melanie Vandenbos

Artworks that survived but not displayed at the University of Central Oklahoma's Max Chambers Library:

- Vigil, kinetic stainless-steel sculpture by William Scott
- Night Riders, sculpture by Charles Pratt
- Lookout from San Bois, marble sculpture by Charles Pebworth
- Riders in the Distance Add to the Risks of Rustlin', bronze statue by Grant Speed
- Stellar Wheel, by Michael Anderson

Lost artworks are as follows:

- Sky Ribbons: An Oklahoma Tribute, fiber sculpture by Gerhardt Knodel
- Columbines at Cascade Canyon, photograph by Albert D. Edgar
- Winter Scene, photograph by Curt Clyne
- Soaring Currents, sisal and rayon textile by Karen Chapnick
- Monolith, porcelain sculpture by Frank Simons
- Through the Looking Glass, wool textile by Anna Burgess
- Palm Tree Coil, bronze sculpture by Jerry McMillan.

An untitled acrylic sculpture by Fred Eversley was severely damaged, but survived the blast.

== Demolition ==
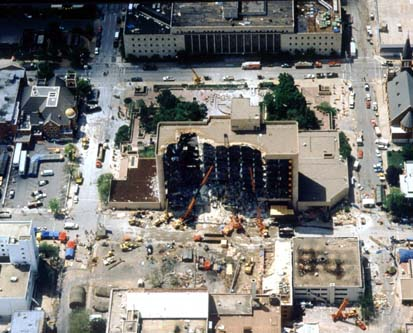
The bombing of the Alfred P. Murrah Federal Building in Oklahoma City was the deadliest act of domestic terrorism in American history.

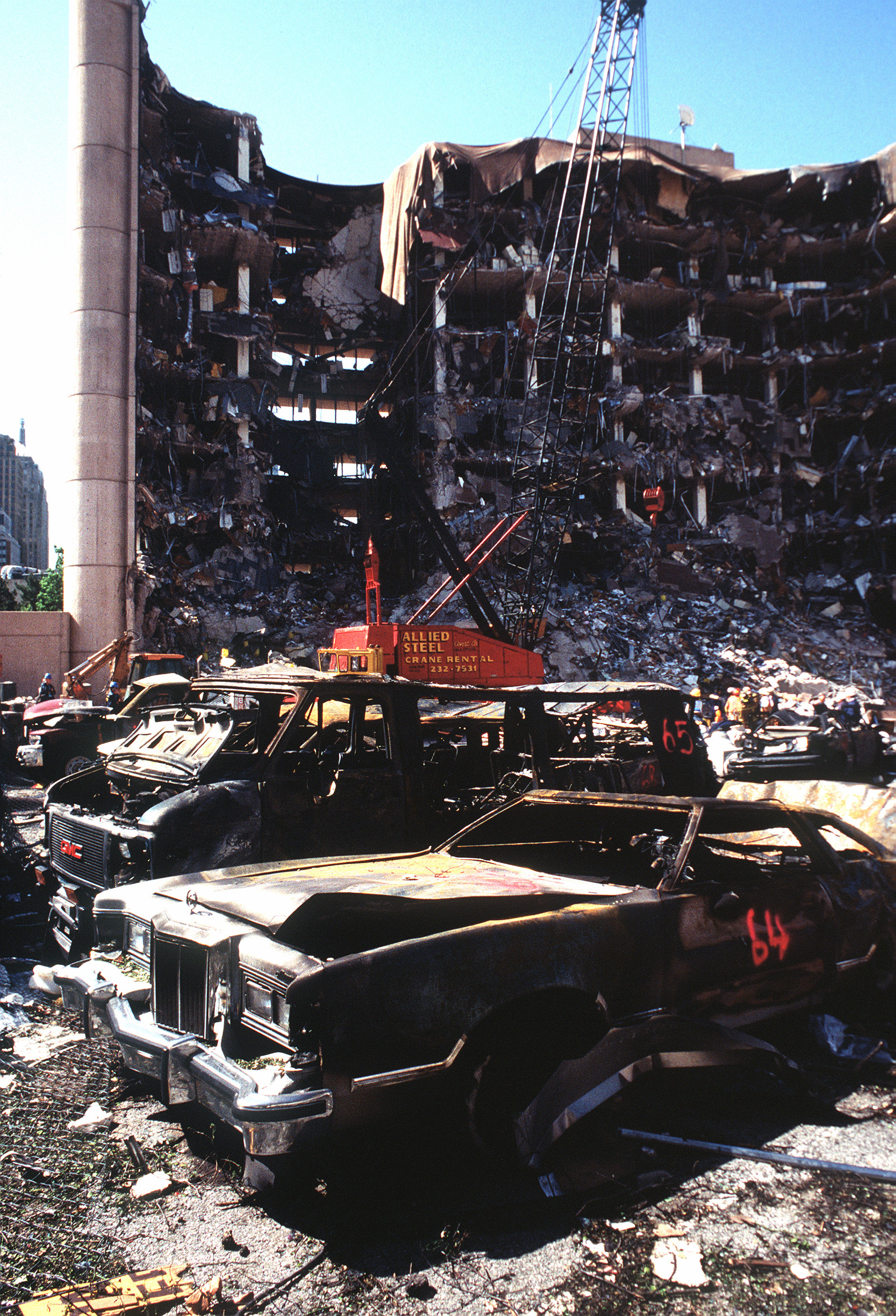
Murrah Building during the cleanup and demolition operation

Rescue and recovery efforts were concluded at 11:50 pm on May 1, with the bodies of all but three victims recovered. For safety reasons, the remains were to be demolished shortly afterward. However, McVeigh's attorney, Stephen Jones, called for a motion to delay the demolition until the defense team could examine the site in preparation for the trial. More than a month after the bombing, at 7:01 am on May 23, the remains were demolished. The final three bodies, those of two credit union employees and a customer, were recovered. For several days after the remains' demolition, trucks hauled 800 tons of debris a day away from the site. Some of it was used as evidence in the conspirators' trials, incorporated into parts of memorials, donated to local schools, or sold to raise funds for relief efforts.

== Remnants and replacement ==
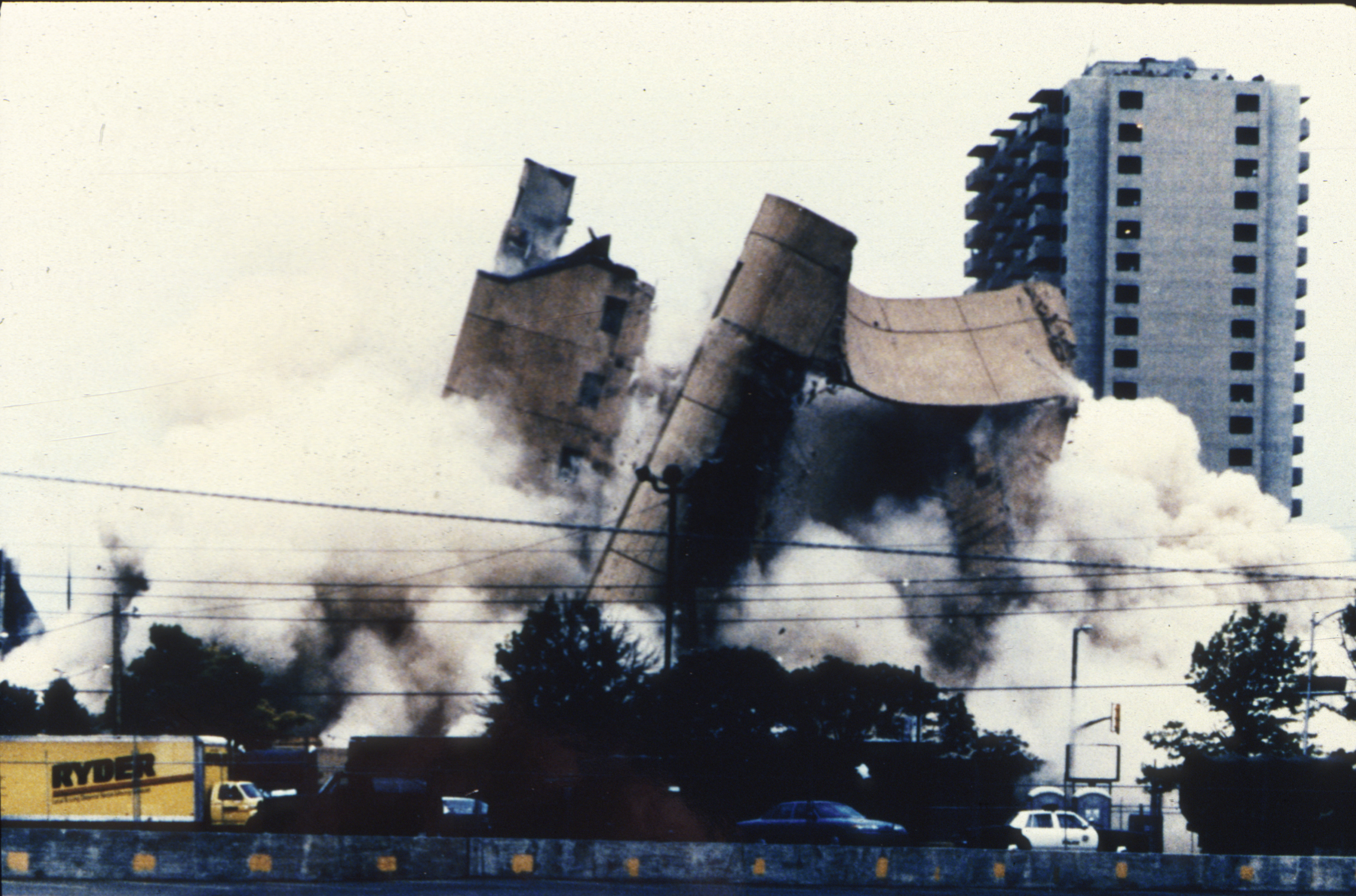
The Alfred P. Murrah Federal Building being demolished on May 23, 1995, over a month after the incident. The bomb used in the attack was housed in a Ryder truck similar to the one visible in the lower left of the photograph.

Several remnants of the building stand on the site of the Oklahoma City National Memorial. The plaza (on what was once its south side) has been incorporated into the memorial; the original flagpole is still in use. The east wall (within the building's footprint) is intact, as well as portions of the south wall. The underground parking garage survived the blast and is used today, but is guarded and closed to the public.

Consideration was given to not replacing the Murrah Building and to renting office space for agencies affected. Ultimately, the General Services Administration broke ground on a replacement building in 2001 which was completed in 2003. The new 185,000-square-foot building was designed by Ross Barney Architects of Chicago, Illinois, with Carol Ross Barney as the lead designer. Constructed on a two-city-block site, one block north and west of the former site, the new building's design maximized sustainable design and workplace productivity initiatives. Security design was paramount to the Federal employees and its neighbors. Secure design was achieved based on the GSA's current standards for secure facilities including blast resistant glazing. Structural design resists progressive collapse. Building mass, glazing inside the courtyard, and bollards help to maintain a sense of openness and security. The art in architecture component of the building incorporates a water feature that acts as an additional security barrier.
