= Richard Wayne Snell =

American white supremacist and murder convict (1930–1995)

Richard Snell
- Snell at his clemency hearing (April 12, 1995)
- Born: May 21, 1930; Oklahoma, U.S.
- Died: April 19, 1995 (aged 64); Cummins Unit, Arkansas, U.S.
- Organization: The Covenant, the Sword, and the Arm of the Lord
- Status: Executed by lethal injection
- Motive: Antisemitism; White supremacy
- Conviction: Capital murder (2 counts)
- Penalty: Death

Details
- Date: November 3, 1983–June 30, 1984
- Country: United States
- Location: Arkansas
- Killed: William Stumpp, 36; Louis P. Bryant, 37
- Weapons: .22 Ruger with silencer.45 Colt Commander.223 Ruger Mini-14

Richard Wayne Snell (May 21, 1930 – April 19, 1995) was an American white supremacist convicted of killing a pawn shop owner whom he mistook for a Jew and a black police officer in Arkansas on November 3, 1983, and June 30, 1984, respectively. Snell was sentenced to death for one of the murders and executed by lethal injection in 1995.

== Background ==
Richard Snell was a member of the white supremacist group The Covenant, The Sword, and the Arm of the Lord (known as the CSA), which was started in 1971 in the small community of Elijah, Missouri, by polygamist James Ellison. He was also a believer in the Christian Identity religion, and frequented Elohim City, a private community located in Oklahoma. The Bureau of Alcohol, Tobacco, Firearms and Explosives (ATF) had ongoing investigations into the organization. By the end of their operations, the ATF obtained 155 Krugerrands (gold coins), one live light antitank rocket (LAW), 94 long guns, 30 handguns, 35 sawed-off shotguns and machine guns, one light machine gun (a Japanese copy of the World War I Lewis, in .303 caliber), and three and a half bars of C-4 explosives. Much of this arsenal had been stolen.

In 1983, Snell, accompanied by fellow CSA members William Thomas and Steven (Stephen) Scott, attempted to dynamite a natural gas pipeline near Fulton, Arkansas, unsuccessfully. Scott was eventually captured and convicted of that crime, while several other CSA members were arrested on various other charges, mostly weapons violations. By 1985, the CSA had essentially fallen into inactivity due to most of its members having been either killed or incarcerated.

== Murders and execution ==
Snell, known to his friends as "Wayne", was an anomaly amongst the militants of the CSA, in that he operated autonomously, using the CSA compound as his base of operation. Steven Scott, a frequent collaborator with Snell, gave this information in a federal prison holding cell to one of the then members.

On November 3, 1983, Snell, accompanied by Thomas and Scott, shot and killed pawn shop owner William Stumpp, whom he mistakenly believed was of Jewish descent, in Arkansas. Thomas waited outside while Scott followed Snell inside.

On June 30, 1984, Snell killed black Arkansas State Trooper Louis P. Bryant near De Queen, Arkansas. Snell then left the scene and drove across the Oklahoma state line. A truck driver who witnessed the killing of Officer Bryant followed him and contacted the Broken Bow police department. The police officers there set up a roadblock where they engaged Snell in a shootout that resulted in Snell being shot six times and suffering injuries to the abdomen, knee, and ankle. Snell was then arrested and returned to Arkansas for trial, where he was convicted of murder and sentenced to life in prison for the murder of Bryant and death for the murder of Stumpp. Snell never denied the allegations made against him, or the crimes he was accused of having committed.

In exchange for testimony against Snell, Thomas was allowed to plead guilty to a federal racketeering charge. He was sentenced to 12 years in prison, to run concurrently to other sentences imposed by Missouri and federal courts. In 1987, Scott pleaded guilty to a non-capital charge of first degree murder. He was sentenced to 30 years in prison with 15 years suspended.

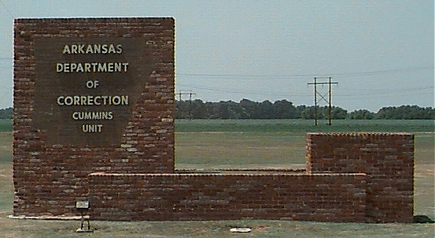
The Cummins Unit, where Snell was executed

Snell was held at the Tucker Maximum Security Unit until April 15, 1995, when he was transferred to the execution site. Snell's death sentence was carried out on April 19, 1995, at the Cummins Unit in Lincoln County, Arkansas.

=== Oklahoma City bombing ===
He was executed on the same day that Timothy McVeigh carried out the Oklahoma City bombing, which destroyed the Alfred P. Murrah Federal Building. Snell had been accused of plotting to bomb the Murrah Building in 1983. Fort Smith-based federal prosecutor Steven Snyder told the FBI in May 1995 that Snell wanted to blow up the Oklahoma City building as revenge for the IRS raiding his home. Snell abandoned his plan after the rocket launcher he had been practicing with exploded in his hands. He took this as a sign that God didn't want him to go ahead with the plan. Snell had repeatedly predicted there would be a bombing on the day of his execution.

Snell watched televised reports of the Oklahoma City bombing on the day of his execution. Reports of his reaction varied, and Snell was either appalled at what he saw or was "smiling and chuckling and nodding." One theory holds that Timothy McVeigh committed his bombing in retaliation for Snell's execution. McVeigh, however, said that his primary motivation for the bombing was retaliation against the government for its Waco siege that took place exactly two years prior on April 19, 1993, and the government's handling of the Ruby Ridge crisis.

In his last words before being executed, Snell addressed then-Governor Jim Guy Tucker:

"Well, I had a lot to say, but you have me at an inconvenience. My mind is blurred, but I'm going to say a couple of words. Governor Tucker, look over your shoulder; justice is coming. I wouldn't trade places with you or any of your cronies. Hell has victories. I am at peace."

== See also ==
- Capital punishment in Arkansas
- List of people executed in Arkansas
- List of people executed in the United States in 1995
