= 1976 Yeşilköy airport attack =

Attack by Palestinian group in Turkey

- Part of the Israeli-Palestinian conflict
- Location: Yeşilköy Airport, Istanbul, Turkey
- Date: 11 August 1976
- Attack type: grenade attack, mass shooting
- Deaths: 4
- Injuries: ~20
- Victim: Ernest Eliash; Yutako Hirano; Harold Wallace Rosenthal; Shlomo Weisbach
- Perpetrator: Popular Front for the Liberation of Palestine
- Assailants: Mohamed Mehdi and Mohamed Husain al-Rashid

On 11 August 1976, the Popular Front for the Liberation of Palestine carried out a terrorist attack against Yeşilköy Airport in Istanbul, Turkey, killing four people and injuring 20 more.

== Incident ==
The attack occurred as passengers began boarding an El Al Boeing 707 destined for Tel Aviv; the last group was being taken to the plane via an airport bus. The perpetrators threw grenades and fired at the non-boarded passengers with submachine guns. The killers killed two Israeli tourists, Ernest Eliash from Petah Tikva and Shlomo Weisbach from Haifa, a Japanese tour guide, Yutaki Hirano, and Harold Wallace Rosenthal, aide to U.S. Senator Jacob Javits.

== Perpetrators ==
The terrorists surrendered following a shootout with Turkish police. They identified themselves as Mohamed Mehdi and Mohamed Husain al-Rashid from the Popular Front for the Liberation of Palestine.

== Reactions ==
R-NY Senator Jacob Javits, whose aide Harold W. Rosenthal was killed in the attack, sponsored Senate Resolution 524, "[Urging] the President to direct United States Ambassadors abroad to seek the consideration by foreign governments of suspension of their air service to any foreign nation aiding or abetting terrorism."
