= Hans Schmidt (Waffen-SS) =

SS Officer

- Born: April 24, 1927; Völklingen, Germany
- Died: May 30, 2010 (aged 83); North Carolina, United States
- Occupations: Businessman, political activist
- Known for: veteran of the Waffen-SS founder of the German-American National Political Action Committee (GANPAC)

Hans Schmidt (24 April 1927 – 30 May 2010) was a German-born naturalized American citizen, member of the Waffen-SS during World War II, and founder of the German-American National Political Action Committee (GANPAC). He was primarily known for his promotion of White separatism, Nazism, antisemitism, and Holocaust denial. Schmidt was arrested in Germany on hate charges in 1995, but avoided standing trial by returning to the USA while released on bail.

== Early life ==
Schmidt was born on 24 April 1927, in Völklingen. During Nazi rule, he was a member of the Hitler Youth, and, by his own account, joined the Waffen-SS in 1943 at the age of 16, and served as a corporal in the SS Division Leibstandarte. Schmidt was wounded twice during campaigns in Hungary, Austria, and the Battle of the Bulge. He left Germany in 1947, arrived in the United States in 1949, and became a naturalized citizen in 1955 in Chicago.

== Political activism ==
=== GANPAC ===
In 1983, Schmidt founded the German-American National Political Action Committee (GANPAC), which published the GANPAC Brief in English and the USA-Bericht ([U.S.A. Report]) in German. GANPAC was characterized as "pretending to represent the 52 million Americans of German descent" by the German magazine Der Spiegel, as "openly anti-Semitic" by The New York Times, and as "virulently anti-Semitic" by the Anti-Defamation League. GANPAC was also accused of promoting Holocaust denial.

Between 1983 and 1985, GANPAC raised about $55,000 in contributions, but, unlike other political action committees, did not make any financial contributions until the late 1980s, when it began donating money to the election campaigns of conservative Republican candidates. However, Schmidt's efforts to ingratiate himself to politicians ended up backfiring, as his delusions about them repeatedly humiliated him in public. To give one example, when U.S. Senator Steve Symms gave a $1,000 contribution from GANPAC to the Anti-Defamation League of B'nai B'rith and the Idaho Holocaust Council, Schmidt complained to the Federal Election Commission and was bluntly informed that Symms' actions were completely legal and he had no case—and Symms publicly disavowed Schmidt's beliefs as well. GANPAC also made a contribution to Democrat Bob Edgar who was running against Jewish Republican candidate Arlen Specter, only to have Edgar state that while he wanted to take over Sen. Specter's seat in the Senate, he actually agreed with Specter's pro-Israel views.

The Santa Monica offices of GANPAC were fire-bombed in 1985, causing $50,000 in damage. Schmidt claimed the Jewish Defense League carried out the attack, a claim the JDL rejected.

The GANPAC Brief was published out of Washington, D.C. (1983-1989), Santa Monica, California (1990-1993), Burke, Virginia (January–March 1994), and Pensacola, Florida (April 1994-July 2004).

=== GIEA ===
Schmidt also founded the German-American Information and Education Association (GIEA), which is presided over by E. Stanley Rittenhouse, a known antisemite, who "served as chief legislative representative for the Liberty Lobby, a far-right organization founded by Willis Carto, whom the Anti-Defamation League calls "perhaps the most influential professional anti-Semite in the United States".

== Arrest ==
On 9 August 1995 Schmidt was arrested at the Frankfurt airport by German authorities after copies of his newsletter, USA-Bericht, were discovered. He was charged with "incitement to hate" (Volksverhetzung in German) as a result of a letter he had sent to a German state legislator in Schwerin. Schmidt came to regard the German government as treasonous and controlled by "Oberjuden" ("top Jews"), and claimed the U.S. embassy provided false information to Germany to persecute him. The ADL applauded his arrest. Due to poor health, he was released on bail in January 1996. He fled Germany and returned to the US to avoid further prosecution. He wrote a book about this experience, titled Jailed in 'Democratic' Germany (1997).

== Later life and death ==
Schmidt continued antisemitic campaigns, first by calling for a repeal of the Kosher tax (specifically addressing the Adolph Coors Brewing Co.), and later by writing a book entitled End Times/End Games (1999) where he listed all the ways "Aryans" were more accomplished than Jews and begged all Jews to voluntarily leave white-majority countries on their own accord. His influence waned as his friend Ernst Zundel's career withered, and he died in 2010. He had no known survivors.

== Quotations ==
- In a postcard, GANPAC claimed that "Jews were not gassed by the Nazis ... the numbers and reports of predetermined extermination are greatly exaggerated by professional liars".
- According to the German Verfassungsschutz, Schmidt, protected by US law, was very outspoken in his publications and cites an example from The Jewish Question in 20th Century in America": "In the last 200 years, European observers have noted that the Jews are not interested in 'Equality of the Races' but in destroying the white Race."
- The 1996 annual report of the Verfassungsschutz of Lower Saxony, quotes from an issue of USA-Bericht: "What I dislike most about Jews is their apparent deep dishonesty. [...] An outstanding example for this deep dishonesty of most of the Jews [...] is the constant denial of Jewish excessive power [...] [It is] of course indispensable that the Jews are pampered in Germany, just as in nature, it is a parasite's due."

== Writings ==
- Jailed in 'Democratic' Germany: The Ordeal of an American Writer (1997). Published in Milton, Florida by Guderian Books as a 490-page paperback (ISBN 0965413403).
- End Times/End Games: The Final Months of the Jewish Century (1999). First edition published in Pensacola, FL by H. Schmidt as a 406-page paperback (ISBN 0966904702). Second revised and enlarged edition published as a 489-page paperback (ISBN 0966904710). Published in German as Endzeiten, Endspiele: Der Ausklang des jüdischen Jahrhunderts (2000) in Pensacola, FL by Hans Schmidt as a 508-page paperback (ISBN 0966904729).
- SS Panzergrenadier: A True Story of World War II (2001). First published in Pensacola, FL by H. Schmidt Publications as a 402-page hardcover (ISBN 0966904745). Second edition published on 20 April 2002 as a 407-page hardcover (ISBN 0966904753).
- Hitler Boys in America: Re-Education Exposed: A Comparative Study of the Soul Destroying Effects of the Allied Imposed Re-Education on the Psyche of the German People (2003). Published in Pensacola, FL by H. Schmidt Publications as a 319-page hardcover (ISBN 0966904761).

== See also ==
- George P. Dietz
