= Lampley =

Lampley is a surname. Notable people with the surname include:

- Cal Lampley (1924–2006), American composer and record producer
- Jim Lampley (born 1949), American sportscaster, news anchor, film producer and restaurant owner
- Lemone Lampley (born 1964), American basketball player
- Sean Lampley (born 1979), American basketball player
- Willie Ray Lampley, American far right militiaman
