= The Terrorist Next Door (novel) =

1912 mystery novel by Sheldon Siegel

- First edition
- Author: Sheldon Siegel
- Language: English
- Genre: Mystery novel Thriller
- Published: 2012
- Publisher: Sheldon M. Siegel Inc
- Publication place: United States
- ISBN: 978-0983006268

The Terrorist Next Door is a mystery novel and thriller by Sheldon Siegel featuring Detective David Gold, published in 2012.

== Reception ==
The book has received reviews from publications including Publishers Weekly, HuffPost, Booklist, and Library Journal.
