= 11th Hour Remnant Messenger =

Defunct antisemitic Christian Identity organization

The 11th Hour Remnant Messenger was an American antisemitic Christian Identity organization established in Sandpoint, Idaho, by wealthy retired entrepreneurs Vincent Bertollini and Carl E. Story. The sect was located in proximity to the neo-Nazi Aryan Nations compound and cooperated with a number of Aryan Nations members. Bertollini and Story had ultimately selected the city of Sandpoint on account that roughly 98% of the area's residents were non-Jewish Caucasian Americans.

Members of the group believed that non-Jewish white Europeans are the Israelites (the chosen people) described in the Bible, while people who are ethnically Jewish are descendants of Eve and Satan. Furthermore, the sect's adherents proclaimed that non-whites were "soulless". They went on to print large, elaborate, expensive posters depicting their own "tree of heredity" for major ethnic groups and mailed it to a number of persons living in the area.
