= Vincent Bertollini =

American white supremacist (1939-2025)

- Born: Richard Vincent Bertollini; September 3, 1939; United States
- Died: May 1, 2025 (aged 85); St. Marys, Georgia, U.S.
- Other names: Vince Bert, Richard Vincent Bert
- Occupation: Business executive

Richard Vincent Bertollini (September 3, 1939 – May 1, 2025), also known as Vince Bert, was an American business executive, anti-semite and white supremacist who gained notoriety for providing financial support to Richard Butler, the founder of Aryan Nations.

Bertollini, along with a close friend and former business partner, Carl Story (b. 1936), was notorious for running the Sandpoint, Idaho-based 11th Hour Remnant Messenger, a Christian Identity ministry which worked closely with Butler's group and often mailed its racist pamphlets to area neighborhoods.

Bertollini was arrested on April 12, 2006, by the FBI in Santa Fe, New Mexico after fleeing a drunk driving charge in Bonner County, Idaho, in July 2001. On August 25, 2006, he pleaded guilty and was sentenced to two concurrent prison sentences of one to four years, both of which were suspended, and concurrent 6-month sentences in the Bonner County Jail. The agreement also called for $10,000 in fines with $2,000 suspended, leaving a balance of $8,000. In June 2007 he was sentenced to 41 months in prison in New Mexico after being found guilty of federal charges for being a fugitive in possession of firearms. At the time of his arrest, agents discovered a sawed-off 12-gauge shotgun with a shell racked into firing position and a loaded .380-caliber semiautomatic pistol.

After his release from the federal prison in Florence, Colorado in 2010, Bertollini moved to Albuquerque, started calling himself "Vince Bert," and obtained part-time employment in order to supplement his monthly Social Security payments. The Southern Poverty Law Center reported that Bertollini restarted his ministry and book publishing operations "days after being released from prison." He died on May 1, 2025, in St. Marys, Georgia.
