= Liberty Bell (magazine) =

American neo-Nazi magazine

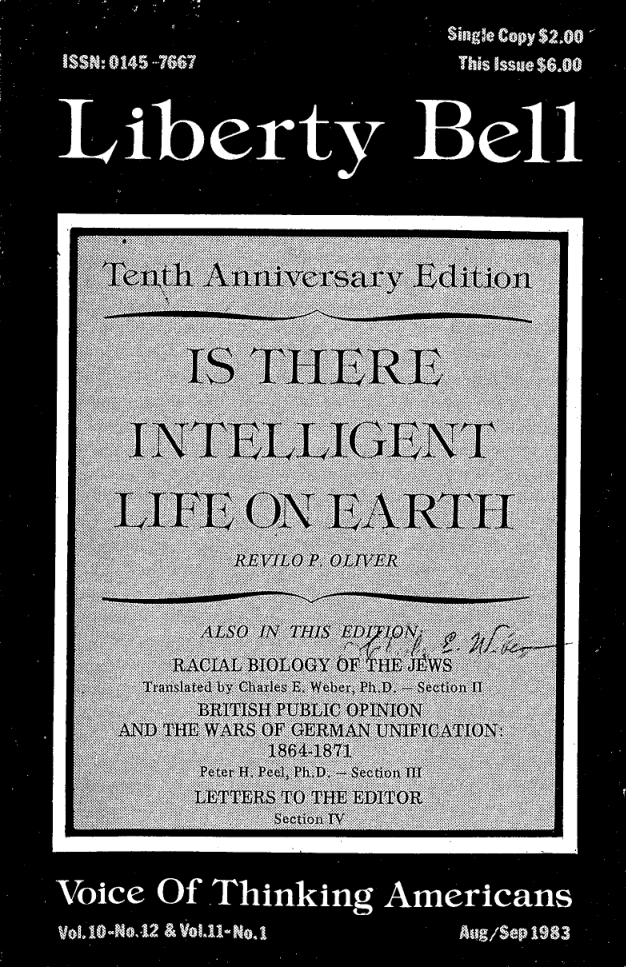
- Cover of the August/September 1983 issue
- Editor: George P. Dietz
- Categories: Political
- Frequency: Monthly
- Founder: George P. Dietz
- First issue: 1973
- Final issue Number: February 1999; 27 years ago Vol. 26, no. 6
- Company: Liberty Bell Publications
- Country: United States
- Based in: Reedy, West Virginia
- Language: English
- ISSN: 0145-7667
- OCLC: 2772513

Liberty Bell was an American monthly neo-Nazi magazine operated by George P. Dietz out of Reedy, West Virginia, published by Dietz's company Liberty Bell Publications. It was established in 1973 and published from then until its cessation in February 1999. Dietz, both publisher and editor, was a neo-Nazi activist and German immigrant to the United States, previously a member of the Hitler Youth. Dietz ran a neo-Nazi publishing business, including several periodicals and publishing companies.

Liberty Bell played an influential role in the 1974 Kanawha County Textbook War; after the controversy, the magazine shifted away from John Birch Society ideology and to a more explicitly antisemitic direction. It was explicitly neo-Nazi in ideology, though avoided explicit Nazi symbolism; it was named after and used as its logo the Liberty Bell. There was for a time a sister periodical to Liberty Bell, the White Power Report, which was more explicitly neo-Nazi in style, though that periodical ceased by the end of the 1970s. In 1983, Dietz launched an online bulletin board system (BBS), Liberty Bell Net, where he uploaded articles from Liberty Bell.

The magazine had several contributors from several sections of the far-right; notable contributors included Revilo P. Oliver, David Myatt, Robert E. Miles, and Ernst Zündel. In addition to original and reprinted articles on a variety of racist topics, it had a letters section and book reviews. It also advertised and sold antisemitic materials and literature.

== History ==
Liberty Bell magazine was established by the neo-Nazi activist George P. Dietz in 1973, published by his company Liberty Bell Publications. Dietz was a German immigrant to the United States who worked as a farm broker, and had previously been a member of the Hitler Youth. He was also a Holocaust denier. Liberty Bell was published out of Reedy, West Virginia. Dietz was also the editor of the magazine. Dietz ran a neo-Nazi publishing business, including several periodicals and publishing companies in several languages; the Los Angeles Times called Liberty Bell his "propaganda flagship".

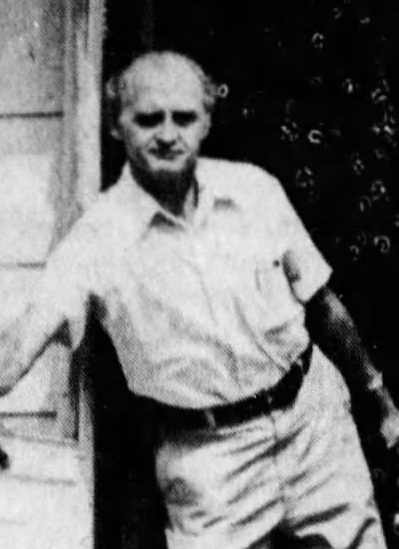
George P. Dietz, the founder of the magazine, in 1980

In the first year of the magazine's existence, the magazine's ideology was closer to the line of John Birch Society (JBS) ideology, less explicitly racialist and antisemitic. That year, Dietz joined the JBS. This changed soon after the creation of the magazine, with a shift towards an explicitly antisemitic direction, in part due to Liberty Bell's role in the 1974 Kanawha County Textbook War, where the contents of school textbooks became a major cultural controversy. Chip Berlet and scholar Carol Mason argued that the publication "fanned the flames" of the controversy. Dietz used various aspects of his publishing business to involve himself in the controversy, including Liberty Bell. It published several essays during the textbook controversy, and initially utilized JBS arguments in arguing about it, arguing for the presence of a communist conspiracy at play behind the textbooks. The magazine further promoted JBS literature to learn more about the subject. Local preachers wrote about the controversy in the magazine. As part of the controversy, the magazine criticized the "whole language" teaching method, in favor of phonics. The magazine argued that the prevalence of whole language teaching methods was a plot by the communist education establishment to create an "army of illiterates".

One essay the magazine published on the controversy, "A Message to All True Sons of Appalachia", argued about it differently, from a racial angle, that White Anglo-Saxon Protestants were under attack; Carol Mason argues that this was significant as an "explicitly racialized argument that went beyond the conspiracist populism that characterizes so many other curriculum disputes", with the magazine's involvement showing "in one forum competing voices from the Right, namely those from the anticommunist John Birch Society, which was losing membership and influence, and those from a more revolutionary and ultraright faction, which would grow stronger". She wrote that the textbook controversy was a turning point for Dietz, who changed to "relinquishing the John Birch Society’s anticommunist rhetoric and his promotion of an explicit anti-Semitic discourse instead", declaring "the Jew" as the enemy. As the controversy went on, Dietz and Liberty Bell explicitly denounced the JBS and its leader Robert Welch by 1975, officially breaking with the JBS in August; Dietz claimed he left because he believed that they were insufficiently antisemitic, while the JBS claimed they had thrown him out for being un-American.

With advances in online communication in the early 1980s, Dietz began learning technology-related skills and trying to bring Liberty Bell online. He cited security benefits and expanded communication networks. In August 1983, Dietz launched an online bulletin board system (BBS), Liberty Bell Net, also called Info.International Network. It ran on an Apple IIe microcomputer. Some of the first materials uploaded to the BBS were articles of Liberty Bell, particularly from Revilo Oliver. The BBS served a similar purpose to the print magazine, aiming to distribute Dietz's materials to a wider audience; it was not an open forum as posting on it required a password given by Dietz, as well as the submission of personal information and a fee. The board was advertised only to subscribers of the magazine rather than mainstream computer magazines. Some content was paywalled behind an annual membership fee. A second address was created for the BBS in 1988, hosted in Chicago. It is unclear when the BBS ceased activity, though it appears to have been at some time in the 1990s.

Following health issues suffered by Dietz in the late 1980s, the magazine downsized and several of its sections ceased. Dietz also published far fewer letters. On April 20, 1989, the anniversary of Adolf Hitler's birthday, the magazine held a special issue celebrating him. It contained a reprint of an article titled "Hitler was Right!", which had originally appeared in the British neo-Nazi magazine Gothic Ripples, which celebrated Hitler and held him as prescient on many issues. Liberty Bell ended in February 1999, with its final issue being vol. 26, no. 6.

== Contents and profile ==
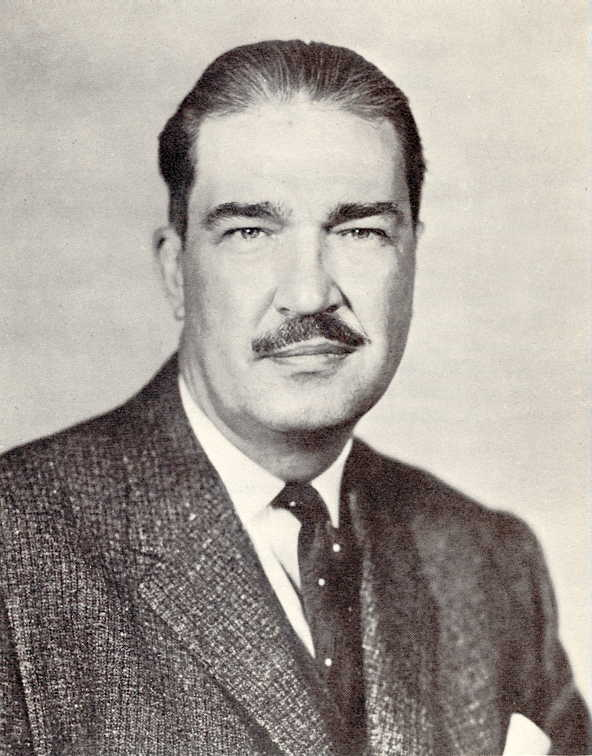
Revilo P. Oliver, perhaps the most prolific contributor to the magazine, in 1963

The magazine had several contributors who wrote articles on a variety of racist topics. The far-right writer and literature professor Revilo P. Oliver wrote for the magazine; he wrote for several far-right publications, but contributed most to Liberty Bell. Scholar Berry T. Damon said that he had perhaps contributed to the magazine "more than any other single person". In contributing, he used his real name alongside several pseudonyms. When he died, the magazine eulogized him, and Liberty Bell Publications published a collection of his essays published in Liberty Bell.

British neo-Nazi satanist David Myatt wrote for Liberty Bell in the 1990s under both his own name and the pseudonym Wulstan Tedder, writing articles that included "The Meaning of National-Socialism" and "The Meaning of Life: Race and Nature". Holocaust denier Ernst Zündel, under his pseudonym Christof Friedrich, wrote various articles for the magazine. Ku Klux Klan Grand Dragon Robert E. Miles also wrote for Liberty Bell.

In addition to original articles, it included reprints of older materials and articles from other neo-Nazi publications. It had a letters section, which included letters from white supremacists in prison across the nation and supporters nationally and internationally. Books were reviewed in the magazine. Books reviewed included Zündel and Eric Thomson's 1977 book The Hitler We Loved & Why, and William Gayley Simpson's neo-Nazi tome Which Way Western Man? Works by contributors, including Oliver and Zündel, were also advertised in the magazine. Names of letter writers in the letters to the editor section were given as simply their initials and their state, to protect their privacy.

Alongside Liberty Bell, Liberty Bell Publications published the neo-Nazi White Power Report and a German neo-Nazi bulletin, Der Schulungsbrief. White Power Report lasted only a few years and ceased by the end of the 1970s, though Liberty Bell continued long past that date.

=== Ideology ===
Liberty Bell was explicitly neo-Nazi in orientation; the Anti-Defamation League called it a "neo-Nazi hate sheet", and scholar Brian Lewis called it "blatantly anti-Semitic". Instead of what Mason described as the John Birch Society's more oblique cultural racism, "the Liberty Bell promoted a racism based on biology, heredity, and blood." Instead of a swastika or other explicit Nazi symbolism, it continued to use the eponymous Liberty Bell as a logo, an American historical symbol. This may have been to enable appeal to those put off by the swastika. Unlike many of the white supremacist periodicals of the time, Liberty Bell was not associated with a membership association. It was published monthly. One of its mottos was "Voice of America's New Revolution". Issues started by advocating that white people educate themselves on the dangers of integration.

Liberty Bell was focused on antisemitic and racist articles, though it avoided explicit neo-Nazi symbolism. It printed fiction and nonfiction articles; one was titled "The Jewish Associates of Benedict Arnold". The White Power Report focused more on the present activities and the community of neo-Nazis. The White Power Report was also somewhat more explicitly Nazi in orientation; unlike Liberty Bell, it openly used the swastika, and offered to sell Mein Kampf. Liberty Bell (as well as the White Power Report) offered for sale a litany of antisemitic materials. Jerry Bornstein called both "ultra-rightist and anti-Semitic" and said that the "main difference between the two was that White Power carried pro-Nazi articles, featured the swastika, offered Hitlerite literature for sale, and reported on the activities of neo-Nazi groups around the world, while Liberty Bell did not."

Articles were frequently, but not solely, critical of Christianity. Oliver specifically repeatedly criticized Christianity in the periodical as "Jewish superstition", calling it a "Jewish invention", "cancer", and a "mental virus". This drew critical responses from Donald V. Clerkin, a Christian contributor, who wrote an essay defending Christianity from a racist point of view. Oliver wrote a rebuttal, and only further intensified his attacks on Christianity in the periodical from then on. Liberty Bell also published Myatt's 1984 article "Vindex: The Destiny of the West". In that article, Myatt presents an esoteric neo-Nazi view of history, arguing that through "Aeonics", neo-Nazis can channel "sinister" energies to overcome the "Nazarene" (Christian) era and usher in a figure known as "Vindex".

== Legacy ==
Carol Mason writing for the Oxford Research Encyclopedia of Literature listed it as an influential publication "on the xenophobic right". In 2026, scholar Ian Glazman-Schillinger wrote that by the early 1980s, "Dietz had established himself and Liberty Bell as crucial fixtures in the white power movement." Chip Berlet and Mason said it was a "precursor of white supremacist online activity". They argued that with the launch of the Liberty Bell Net and Liberty Bell's presence on it, Dietz "launched a new era of white supremacist organizing in cyberspace." It was one of the earliest uses of computer networks for white supremacist activity, though the BBS's specific content likely did not have a large influence on the white supremacist movement. Glazman-Schillinger identified it as an influence on the later white supremacist website Stormfront.

Mason also noted its influence on the textbook controversy, particularly with the "A Message to All True Sons of Appalachia" essay and its explicitly racialized angle, and that "beginning with the Liberty Bell magazine, [Dietz] left the conspiracism of the John Birch Society behind to fan the flames of a revolutionary right-wing movement that went far beyond conservatism."

In an analysis of the ideology of Revilo P. Oliver, scholar Damon T. Berry wrote that his involvement in the magazine was "significant" in its illustration of his changing views and his "efforts to find new associations with an emerging racial nationalist movement in America".
