= Gerhardt Knodel =

American artist, educator (born 1940)

- Born: Gerhardt Gunther Knodel; 1940 (age 85–86); Milwaukee, Wisconsin, U.S.
- Education: University of California, Los Angeles, California State University, Long Beach
- Occupations: Textile and fiber artist, installation artist, academic administrator, educator
- Website: gknodel.com

Gerhardt Gunther Knodel (born 1940), is an American contemporary textile artist, academic administrator, and educator. He was the head of the fiber arts department at Cranbrook Academy of Art from 1970 to 1997, and also served as the school director from 1997 to 2007. In 2016, he was named a fellow of the American Craft Council (ACC).

== Early life and education ==
Knodel was born in 1940, in Milwaukee, Wisconsin, born into family of German heritage. His family moved when he was a child and he was raised in Los Angeles, California.

Knodel studied art at Los Angeles City College (LACC), the University of California, Los Angeles (B.A. degree, 1961), and the California State University, Long Beach (M.A. degree, 1970). While attending LACC, Knodel studied under Mary Jane Leland (1923–2022) in the Bauhaus school style.

== Career ==
After graduation, Knodel worked for six years as a high school teacher in Los Angeles. He took a job at Cranbrook Academy of Art, initially as an artist in residence in the fiber department. Knodel worked at Cranbrook Academy of Art from 1970 until 2007, and he held two roles; head of the fiber arts department from 1970 to 1997, and the school director from 1997 to 2007. Notable students of his include Nick Cave, and Katarina Weslien.

His textile work has been used in the creation of installations, as wallpaper, in theater, and for architectural commissions. His series, Recovery Games (2005–2014) was artwork focused on gaming-based interactions paired with visual work as a method of understanding different strategies.

Knodel's work can be found in museum collections, including at the Smithsonian American Art Museum, Rhode Island School of Design Museum, and Minneapolis Institute of Art (MIA).

== Exhibitions ==
- 1984, Gerhardt Knodel, solo exhibition, Elements Gallery, 90 Hudson Street, New York City, New York, U.S.
- 1986, Craft Today: Poetry of the Physical, group exhibition, Museum of Contemporary Crafts (now Museum of Arts and Design), New York City, New York, U.S.
- 1989, Fiber Explorations, New Work in Fiber Art, group exhibition, Staller Center for the Arts at the State University in Stony Brook (now Stony Brook University), Stony Brook, New York, U.S.
