= New England Sociological Association =

The New England Sociological Association, often abbreviated as NESA, is a regional organisation, committed to the improvement of sociological research, teaching, and practice. It has approximately 200 members throughout New England and beyond.

The association specialist are of two conferences each year: a spring conference in April and a fall conference in November. The spring conference is centred on the presentation of original research, while the fall conference typically focuses on teaching and professional development.

== Awards ==
The Apple Award recognises quality teaching within the discipline of sociology. It is typically presented at the annual fall conference, and the recipient is selected from nominations received from the membership by September 15.

The Sociologist of the Year Award recognises contributions to the discipline either through academic scholarship or through outstanding service to the broader community of sociologists, beyond the recipient's own academic department and institution. It is typically presented at the annual spring conference, and the recipient is selected from nominations received from the membership by January 15.
