= Times Record & Roane County Reporter =

Newspaper in Spencer, West Virginia

The Times Record & Roane County Reporter
- Type: Weekly newspaper
- Owner: Spencer Newspapers Inc.
- Founded: 1881
- Headquarters: 210 E Main St. Spencer, West Virginia
- Website: www.thetimesrecord.net

The Times Record & Roane County Reporter is a newspaper serving Spencer, West Virginia, and surrounding Roane County. The two printed titles—the Reporter and Times Record - are the same paper under two different mastheads, with only the editorial page differing. They share the same website. Published weekly. It is owned by Spencer Newspapers, Inc.

== History ==
The oldest of the two papers, the Reporter, was founded as the Weekly Bulletin in 1881. It became the Roane County Reporter in 1915, under the editorship of S. Jack. Shortly after this change, the paper, a Democratic weekly, engaged in a controversy with the Times-Record in the editorial pages over a preacher named Wood, who had become involved in a political matter. Things became so heated with the Times-Record that the editor of the Times-Record, S. A. Simmons, attacked Jack in the street on November 27, 1916, hitting him about the head with his cane. After initially trying to disengage, S. Jack responded by knifing Simmons, stabbing him nine times.

The paper's coverage of the Spencer Comic Book Burning of 1948 was followed around the nation, with many people from around the country writing into the paper expressing support for the event, which had children collect their comic books and burn them publicly, to escape the purported harmful effects of the medium .

The Times-Record and Roane County Reporter merged in the 1990s and are now identical publications except the editorial page. In 2015, the Times Record and Roane County Reporter became the first weekly to win the Newspaper of the Year award from the West Virginia Press Association. In 2025, Spencer Newspapers. which published the paper, was sold to WV News.

== See also ==
- List of newspapers in West Virginia
