= Richard Girnt Butler =

American white separatist leader (1918–2004)

Richard Butler
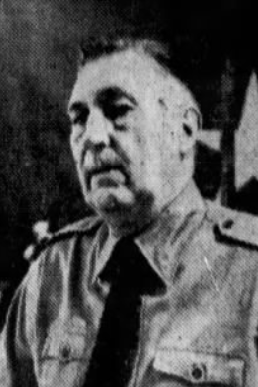
- Butler in 1984
- Born: February 23, 1918; Bennett, Colorado, U.S.
- Died: September 8, 2004 (aged 86); Hayden, Idaho, U.S.
- Education: Los Angeles City College
- Occupation: Aerospace engineer
- Spouse: Betty Litch (m. 1941; died 1995)
- Children: 2
- Military career
- Allegiance: United States of America
- Branch: United States Army Air Forces
- Service years: 1942–1945
- Conflicts: World War II

Richard Girnt Butler (February 23, 1918 – September 8, 2004) was an American engineer, pastor, and neo-Nazi activist. After dedicating himself to the Christian Identity movement, a racist offshoot of British Israelism, Butler founded the National Socialist Aryan Nations and became the "spiritual godfather" to the white separatist movement, in which he was a leading figure. He has been described as a "notorious racist".

== Biography ==
Butler was born in Bennett, Colorado, the only child to Winifred Girnt and Clarence Butler. His father was of English ancestry, while his mother was of German-English ancestry. He was raised in Los Angeles, California beginning in 1931, and after graduating from high school in 1938, he became an aeronautical engineering major at Los Angeles City College. He was a co-inventor of the rapid repair of tubeless tires.

Butler was a member of the Silver Shirts, an American fascist organization modeled on the Nazi Brownshirts, which was active until its suppression following the Japanese attack on Pearl Harbor.

While he was a member of a Presbyterian church, he married Betty Litch in 1941, with whom he fathered two daughters. Litch died on December 1, 1995. After Pearl Harbor, Butler enlisted in the Army Air Corps where he served stateside for the duration of World War II. During this time, he said he developed an admiration for Hitler.

In 1946, Butler organized and operated a machine plant for the production and precision machining of automotive parts and engine assemblies for commercial and military aircraft in the United States, Africa, and India. Butler was a marketing analyst for new inventions from 1964 to 1973. He later became a senior manufacturing engineer for Lockheed Martin in Palmdale, California.

In the 1960s, Butler lived in Whittier, California. He collaborated with William Potter Gale and Wesley Swift in the California Committee to Combat Communism. The three men later founded the Christian Defense League in 1964. Butler served as the organization's executive director and ran the organization out of his Whittier home. Both organizations promoted white supremacy and antisemitism under the guise of preserving American heritage and opposing communism. He also lived in Montebello, California.

In the early 1970s, he moved with his family from Palmdale, California, to North Idaho, where he founded the Aryan Nations, a wing of the Church of Jesus Christ–Christian, whose ideology is a mixture of Christian Identity and Nazism. The organization operated from a 20-acre (81,000 m^{2}) compound in Hayden Lake, Idaho, a suburb of the tourist town Coeur d'Alene, Idaho, which became the center of a Neo-Nazi network with worldwide links. Beginning in the 1980s, Butler was implicated in plots to overthrow the United States government, and he had ties to the neo-Nazi group known as The Order. His group often blanketed the community with fliers and mass mailings, and held an annual parade in downtown Coeur d'Alene; however, the group was condemned by the town of Coeur d'Alene, and locals responded almost immediately by forming the Kootenai County Task Force on Human Relations, with legal battles often overshadowing the parades.

Starting in 1981, Butler organized yearly gatherings of white supremacists at his compound in Idaho which he termed the "Aryan Nations World Congress." At their height in 1984–86, several hundred people would attend including most of the well known leaders of the American far right, such as Klansman Louis Beam, White Aryan Resistance leader Tom Metzger, Gordon "Jack" Mohr, Robert E. Miles, Posse Comitatus leader James Wickstrom, Thomas Robb, Grand Wizard Don Black, and John Trochmann, the leader of the Militia of Montana. At his first conference, Butler called for the division of the United States into racial mini-states, including a white ethnostate in the Pacific Northwest. He said that he had a black ally in the plan, Louis Farrakhan, leader of the Nation of Islam.

In 1987, Butler was among fourteen far right activists indicted for seditious conspiracy by the U.S. Department of Justice as part of the Fort Smith sedition trial. Their trial was held at a federal court in Arkansas. However, "prosecutors failed to convince an Arkansas jury that Butler and several other prominent racists had conspired to start a race war." Butler's wife died in 1995; Harold von Braunhut, an Aryan Nations member who had helped raise funds for Butler during his trial, presided over the funeral.

In 2000, Victoria and Jason Keenan, a Native American mother and son who were harassed at gunpoint by Aryan Nations' members, successfully sued Butler. Represented by local attorney Norm Gissel and Morris Dees's Montgomery, Alabama-based Southern Poverty Law Center, they won a combined civil judgment of $6.3 million from Butler and the Aryan Nations members who attacked them. The couple also received his compound, which they later donated to North Idaho College, who turned it into "Peace Park". In September 2000, fellow Sandpoint, Idaho millionaire Vincent Bertollini provided Butler with a new house in Hayden, Idaho. The house was troublesome for neighbors; police were forced to respond to at least one domestic disturbance call, in which two Aryan Nations members were engaged in an altercation on his lawn.

Butler's 2002 World Congress drew fewer than 100 people, and when he ran for mayor of Hayden against incumbent Ron McIntire, he lost by 2,100 votes to 50.

Butler died in his home on September 8, 2004. A spokesman for Aryan Nations stated that he died in his sleep from congestive heart failure. At the time of his death, Aryan Nations had 200 members.
