= The Terrorist Next Door (Levitas book) =

2002 book by Daniel Levitas

The Terrorist Next Door: The Militia Movement and the Radical Right
- Author: Daniel Levitas
- Language: English
- Genre: Non-fiction
- Published: 2002 (St. Martin's Press)
- Publication place: United States
- ISBN: 978-0-312-32041-6

The Terrorist Next Door: The Militia Movement and the Radical Right is a non-fiction book by Daniel Levitas about the militia movement and the radical right in the United States, published in 2002 by St. Martin's Press.

== Reception ==
The book has received reviews from publications including The New York Times, Los Angeles Times, Chicago Tribune, Humanity & Society, Kirkus Reviews, Publishers Weekly, and Booklist.
