= Robert E. Miles =

White supremacist religious leader (1925–1992)

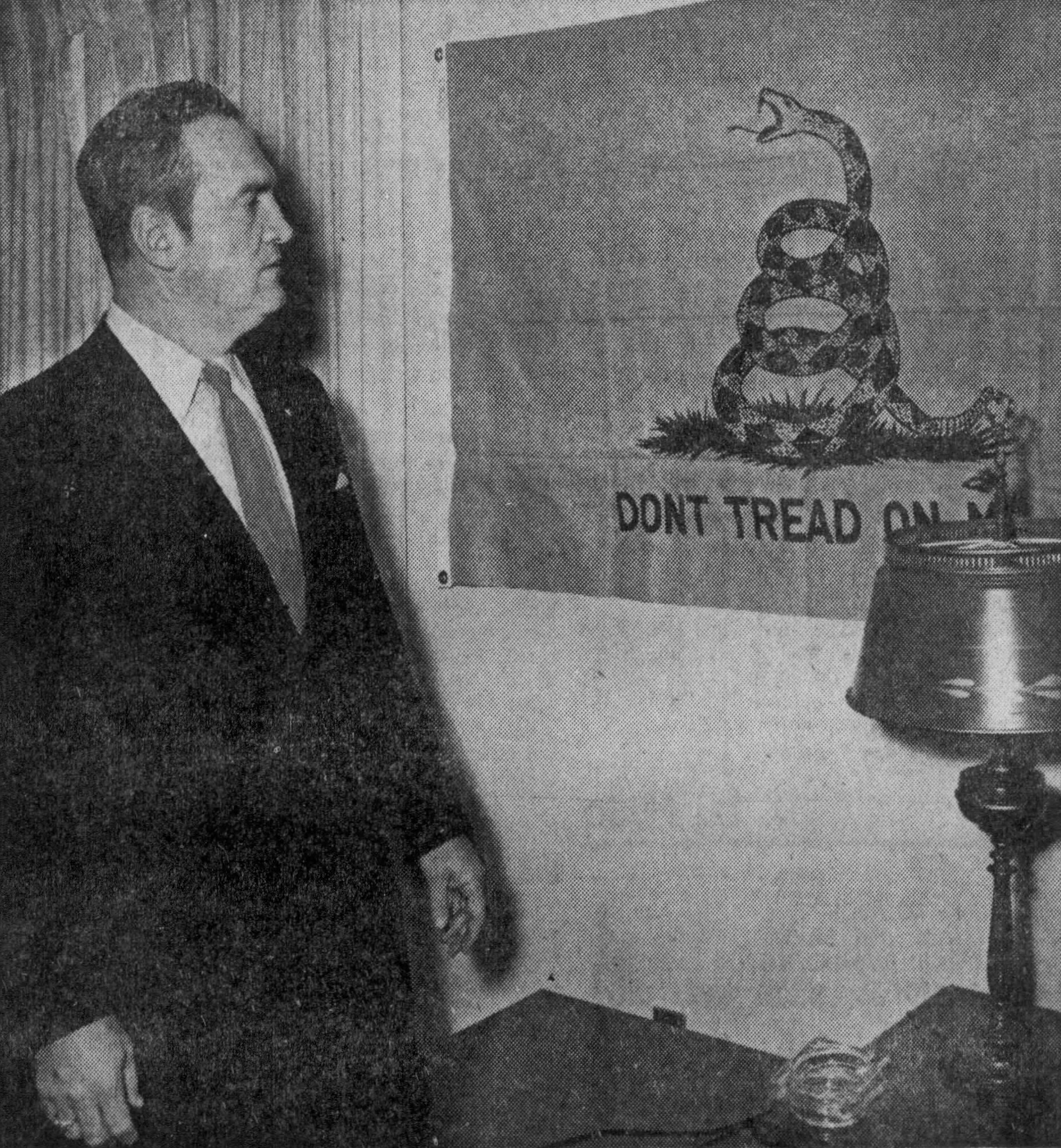
- Miles looking at a Don't Tread on Me flag in 1972
- Born: Robert Edward Miles; January 28, 1925
- Died: August 16, 1992 (aged 67); Howell, Michigan, U.S.
- Organization: Mountain Church of Jesus Christ the Savior

Robert Edward Miles (January 28, 1925 – August 16, 1992) was an American white supremacist theologist and Grand Dragon of the Michigan Ku Klux Klan from Michigan. In 1970, he founded the Mountain Church of Jesus Christ the Savior on his property in Cohoctah Township, becoming a major "dualist" religious leader, and allied himself with various groups that constituted the racist and antisemitic political-religious movement known as Christian Identity, including Aryan Nations. In the early 1980s, Miles endorsed the Northwest Territorial Imperative.

== Biography ==
Robert Edward Miles was born in 1925.

According to his obituary in the Ann Arbor News, Robert Miles was:

"Raised in New York City, Miles joined the Free French forces in 1940 by lying about his age. He worked as a radio operator in Europe and flew 14 sorties into occupied France on agent or supply drops.

When America entered World War II in 1941, he joined the U.S. Navy and finished the war in the Pacific.

After the war, Miles was heavily involved with anti-communist guerrillas in the Philippines. He later was captured by the communists and held in a jungle prison camp for a year before he was repatriated by U.S. officials.

From 1947 to 1969, Miles was an insurance executive for the General Accident Fire and Life Assurance of Perth, Scotland, representing the company in upstate New York and Michigan.

At the same time, Miles was working to train Eastern European guerrillas for work behind the Iron Curtain. In 1953, his house mysteriously exploded in New York. Miles moved to Michigan soon after."

In 1970, he founded the Mountain Church of Jesus Christ the Savior on his property in Cohoctah Township, becoming a major "dualist" religious leader, and allied himself with various groups that constituted the racist and anti-Semitic political-religious movement known as Christian Identity, including Aryan Nations. Miles saw Earth as the site of a battle between a true God and a false god, with Jews acting as agents of the false God against the true "chosen people" that would be "white Aryans". According to the political scientist Michael Barkun, his dualistic theology was important despite its idiosyncrasies, and "the avuncular Miles functioned as a kind of elder statesman of the racial movement".

In August 1970, Miles was nominated by the American Independent Party for Michigan Secretary of State at the state convention in Mount Clemens. In the November general election, he won 18,103 votes, 0.70% of the total.

In 1971, Miles, former Grand Dragon of the Michigan Ku Klux Klan (KKK), was arrested for conspiring to bomb school buses in an attempt to stop the forced busing in Michigan. The media billed it as a "Klan trial" even though Miles had not been associated with the KKK for some time. Miles and four others were later convicted and received sentences ranging from two to five years for this incident. In 1977, Miles received a five-year sentence for the bombing and concurrent 4-year sentences for the tarring and feathering in 1971 of the deputy superintendent of Ann Arbor Public schools.

Following the Greensboro Massacre on November 3, 1979, where anti-Klan communist activists were killed, "a number of previously antagonistic White Supremacist groups, including the Posse Comitatus and various Neo-Nazi and Klan factions, began having discussions about how they could formulate a common ideology. These different groups also conducted joint activities and began establishing informal means of communication including computer bulletin boards and cable TV programs. Many of these groups embraced Christian Identity. Gradually, a White racist alliance emerged. Centers of this movement included Miles' Michigan farm, as well as the Aryan Nations compound in Hayden Lake, Idaho, the site of Identity Pastor Richard Butler's Church of Jesus Christ–Christian. He wrote for George P. Dietz's neo-Nazi magazine Liberty Bell.

In the early 1980s, Miles endorsed the Northwest Territorial Imperative in his seminar Birth of a Nation. According to him, White Americans constituted a separate racial nation and urged white nationalists to establish a separate white state in the Pacific Northwest. "Let us go in peace", he wrote, "let us be considered a Racial Nation of Aryans." Coupled with his increasingly anti-US government position, he was referred to as a "Klanarchist".

Miles had a history of heart problems and suffered a stroke before he died at McPherson Hospital in Howell, Michigan in 1992.
