= Elijah, Missouri =

Community in Missouri, US

- Community
- Location of Elijah, Missouri Elijah, Missouri (the United States)
- Coordinates: 36°36′42″N 92°8′57″W
- Country: U. S. A.
- State: Missouri
- County: Ozark County
- Elevation: 270 m (890 ft)
- Time zone: UTC-6 (CST)
  - Summer (DST): UTC-5 (CDT)

Elijah is an unincorporated community in eastern Ozark County, Missouri, United States. It is located approximately twenty-two miles west of West Plains on Missouri Supplemental Route V, one mile south of U.S. Route 160. The community is located on North Bridges Creek, with Spoon Spring within the village.

The community was named after Elijah Harden, the son of an early settler. A post office was established in 1905 and was closed in 1977. The post office had a ZIP code of 65642, but mail service is now provided by the post office in Caulfield.
