= Cohoctah Township, Michigan =

- Civil township
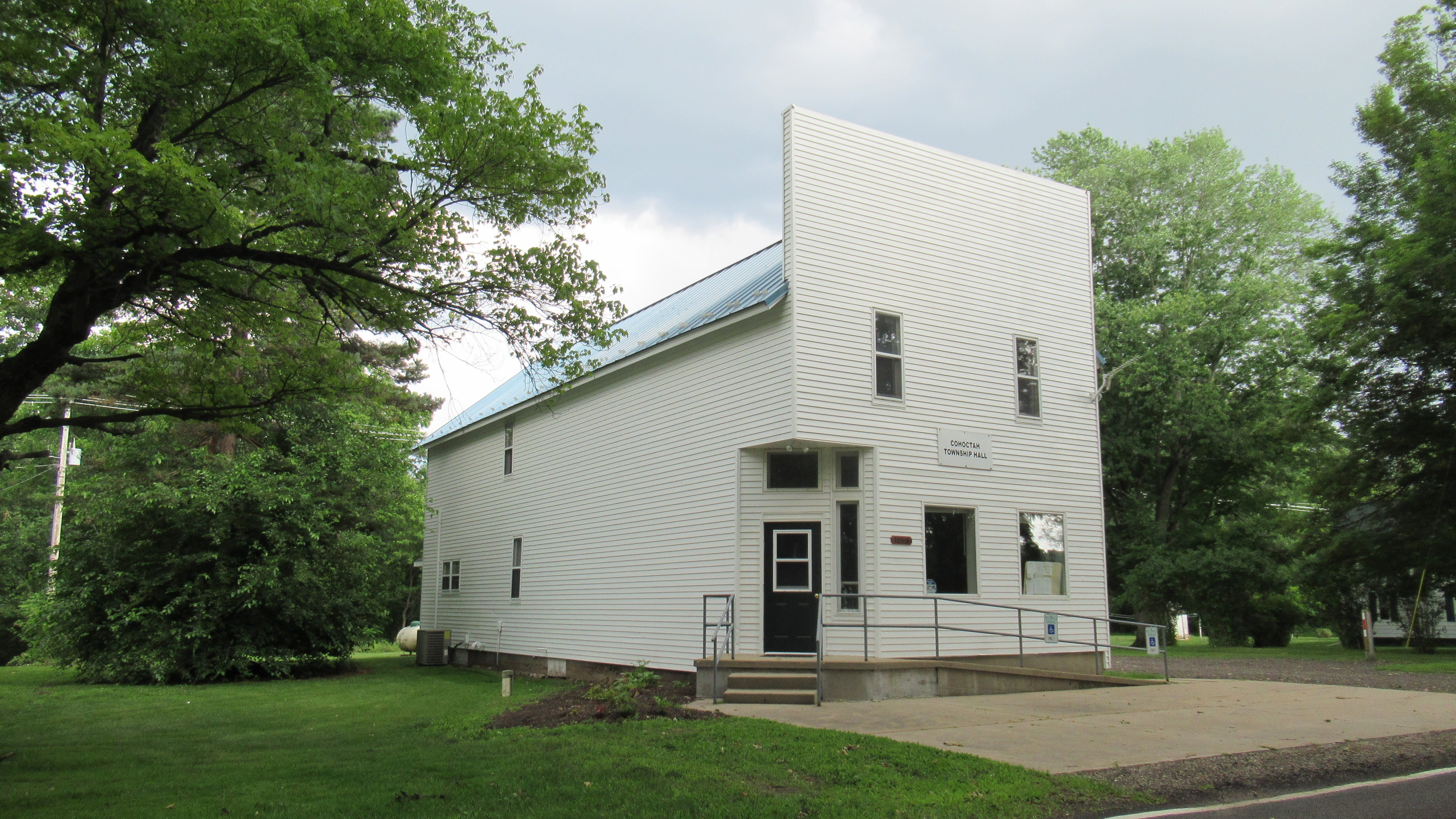
- Cohoctah Township Hall

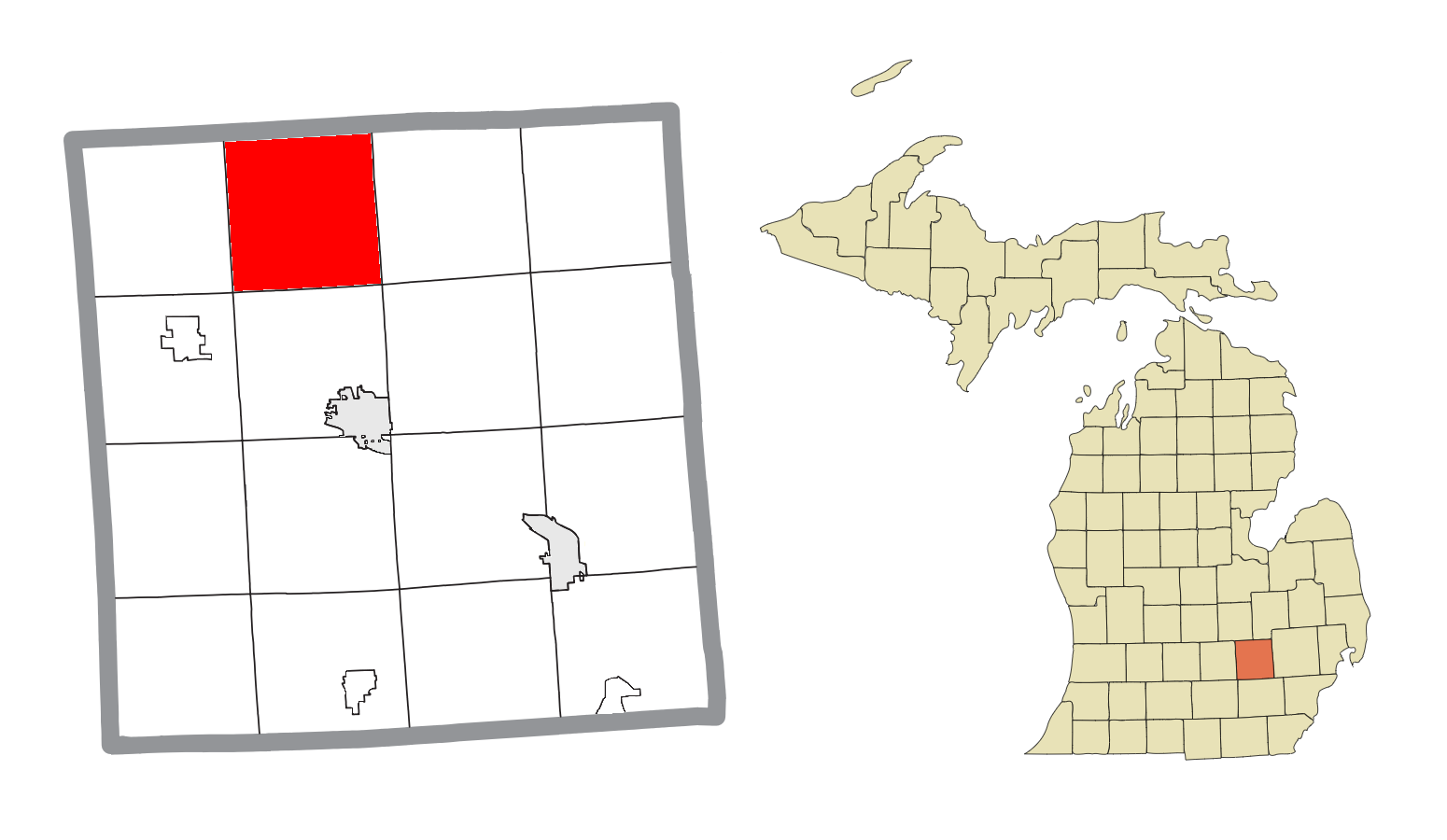
- Location within Livingston County

- Location in Michigan Location in the United States
- Coordinates: 42°43′58″N 83°58′35″W
- Country: United States
- State: Michigan
- County: Livingston
- Settled: 1833
- Organized: 1838 (Tuscola Township); 1857 (Bristol Township); 1867 (Cohoctah Township)

Government
  - Supervisor: Mark Fosdick
  - Clerk: Barb Fear

Area
  - Total: 38.4 sq mi (99.4 km^{2})
  - Land: 37.9 sq mi (98.2 km^{2})
  - Water: 0.46 sq mi (1.2 km^{2})
- Elevation: 890 ft (270 m)

Population (2020)
  - Total: 3,246
  - Density: 85.6/sq mi (33.1/km^{2})
- Time zone: UTC-5 (Eastern (EST))
  - Summer (DST): UTC-4 (EDT)
- ZIP Codes: 48418 (Byron); 48816 (Cohoctah); 48836 (Fowlerville); 48855 (Howell)
- Area code: 517
- FIPS code: 26-16920
- GNIS feature ID: 1623162
- Website: www.cohoctahtownship.gov

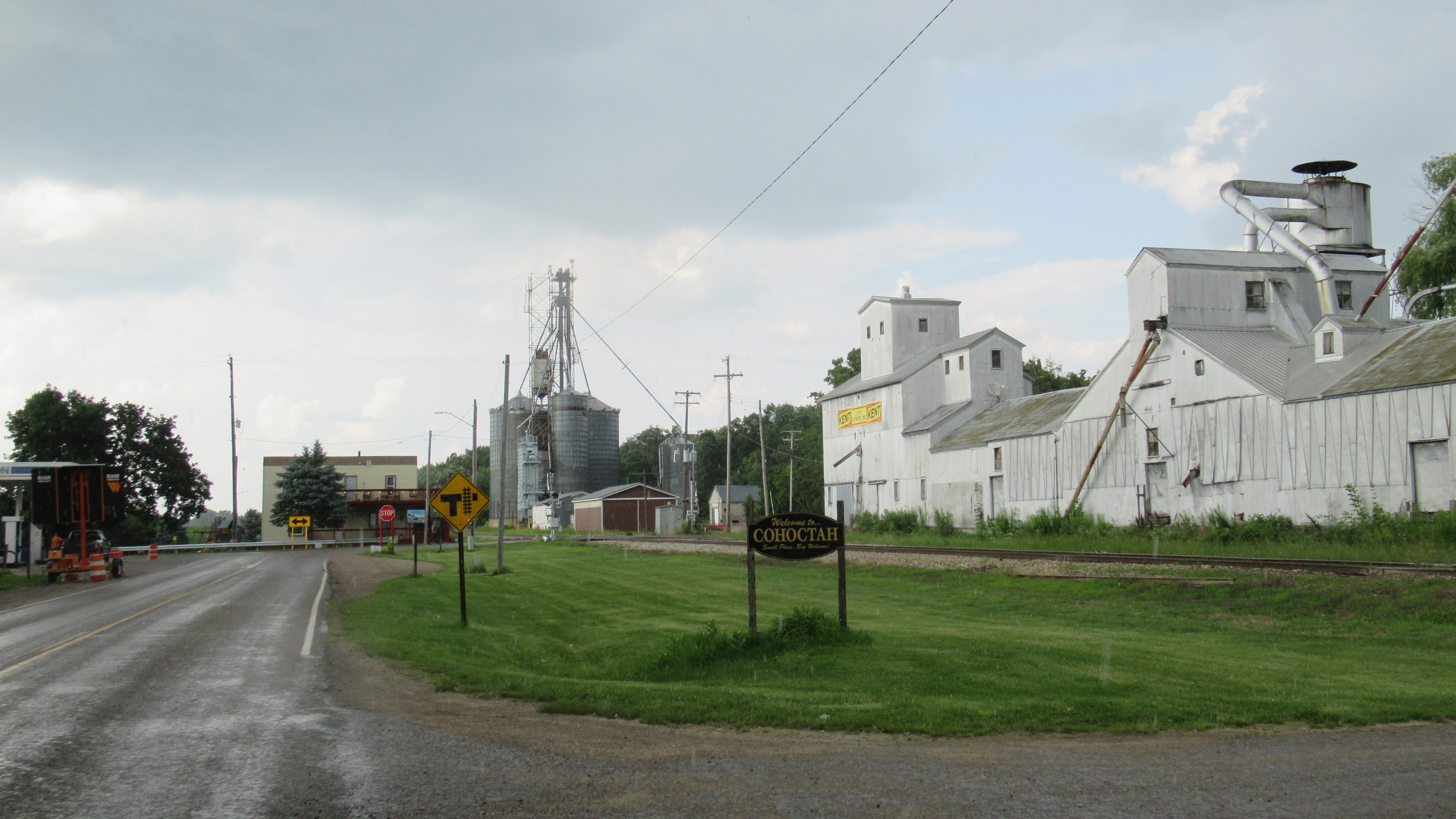
Unincorporated community of Cohoctah

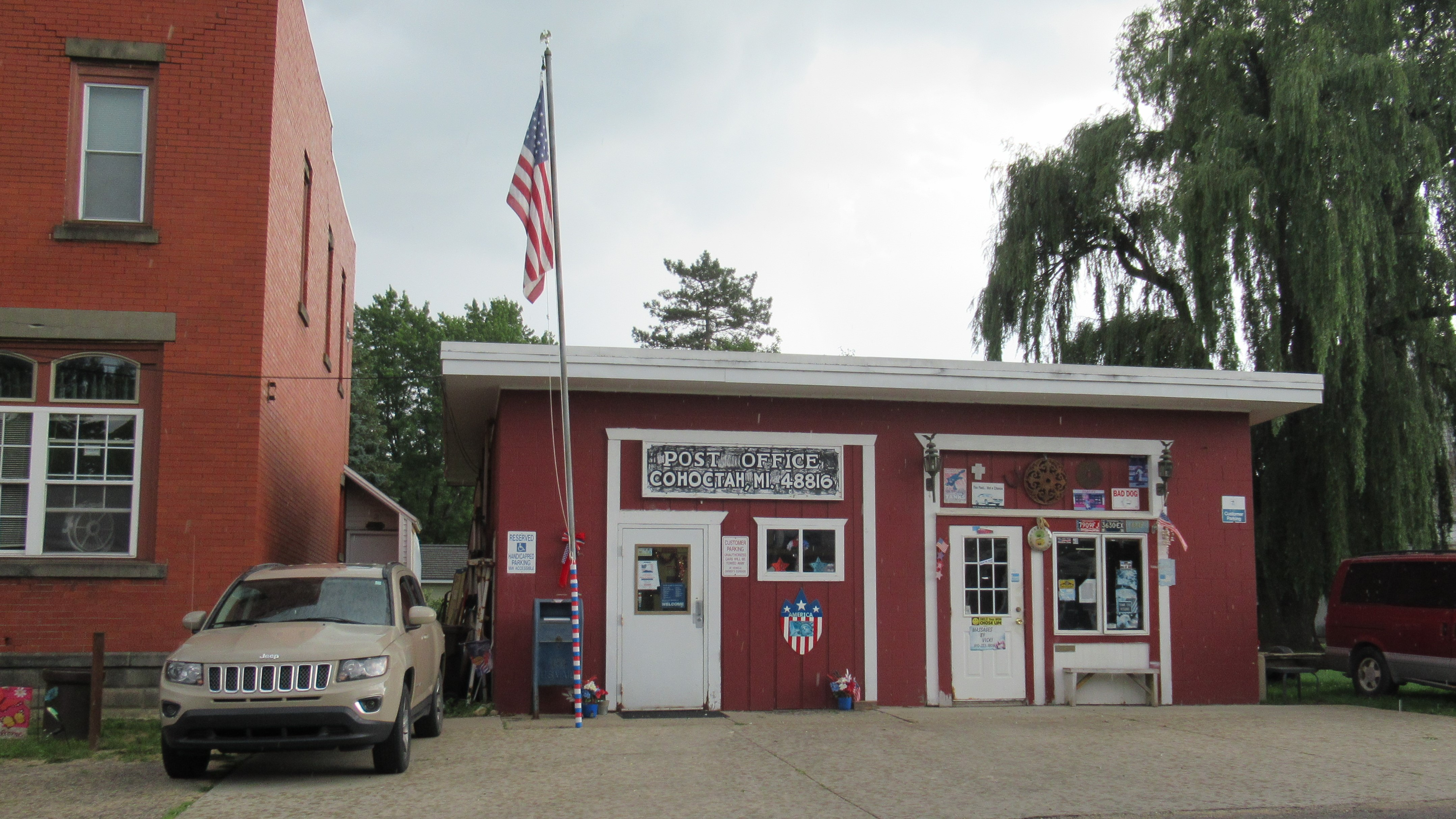
U.S. Post Office in Cohoctah

Cohoctah Township is a civil township of Livingston County in the U.S. state of Michigan. The population was 3,246 at the 2020 census. It is located in the northwest quadrant of the county, bordered by Conway Township to the west, Deerfield Township to the east, and Howell Township to the south. To the north is Shiawassee County.

== History ==
Cohoctah Township was first organized in 1838 with the name of Tuscola Township. It was renamed Bristol Township in 1857 and given its current name in 1867. Boutell Cemetery and Sanford Cemetery are located in the township.

== Communities ==
Farming is the primary use of land, with only three small towns serving as population centers:

- Cohoctah is an unincorporated community in the northeast quadrant of the township at the junction of Oak Grove Road and Cohoctah Road. It started around a grain elevator in 1886 that is no longer in operation.
- Cohoctah Center is an unincorporated community, northwest of the center of Cohoctah Township.
- Oak Grove is an unincorporated community about 6.5 miles (10.5 km) north of Howell and about 4.25 miles (6.84 km) south of Cohoctah, in the eastern part of Cohoctah Township.

== Geography ==
According to the United States Census Bureau, the township has a total area of 38.4 square miles (99.4 km^{2}), of which 37.9 square miles (98.2 km^{2}) are land and 4.5 square miles (11.7 km^{2}), or 1.18%, are water. The township is drained to the north by the South Branch of the Shiawassee River, running near the eastern border of the township.

== Demographics ==
As of the census of 2000, there were 3,394 people, 1,124 households, and 938 families residing in the township. The population density was 89.1 inhabitants per square mile (34.4/km^{2}). There were 1,206 housing units at an average density of 31.7 per square mile (12.2/km^{2}). The racial makeup of the township was 97.91% White, 0.06% African American, 0.47% Native American, 0.27% Asian, 0.09% Pacific Islander, 0.38% from other races, and 0.82% from two or more races. Hispanic or Latino of any race were 0.94% of the population.

There were 1,124 households, out of which 41.7% had children under the age of 18 living with them, 73.3% were married couples living together, 6.0% had a female householder with no husband present, and 16.5% were non-families. 13.0% of all households were made up of individuals, and 4.6% had someone living alone who was 65 years of age or older. The average household size was 3.02 and the average family size was 3.30.

In the township the population was spread out, with 29.0% under the age of 18, 7.7% from 18 to 24, 31.1% from 25 to 44, 25.3% from 45 to 64, and 6.9% who were 65 years of age or older. The median age was 36 years. For every 100 females, there were 108.6 males. For every 100 females age 18 and over, there were 104.5 males.

The median income for a household in the township was $57,500, and the median income for a family was $63,182. Males had a median income of $51,028 versus $27,750 for females. The per capita income for the township was $21,582. About 1.9% of families and 2.6% of the population were below the poverty line, including 4.0% of those under age 18 and 3.3% of those age 65 or over.

== Notable people ==
- Robert E. Miles (1925–1992), white supremacist theologist
- Aiden Zhane (born 1990), drag queen
