= Ruby Ridge (disambiguation) =

The Ruby Ridge standoff was the siege of a cabin by the United States Marshals Service in 1992.

Ruby Ridge may also refer to:

- Ruby Ridge (southern Boundary County, Idaho), where the siege took place
- Ruby Ridge (northeastern Boundary County, Idaho)
