= List of killings by law enforcement officers in the United States, 2001 =

This is a list of people reported killed by non-military law enforcement officers in the United States in 2001, whether in the line of duty or not, and regardless of reason or method. The listing documents the occurrence of a death, making no implications regarding wrongdoing or justification on the part of the person killed or officer involved. Killings are arranged by date of the incident that caused death. Different death dates, if known, are noted in the description. The table below lists 98 people.

== 2001 ==
Date	Name (age) of deceased	State (city)	Description
2001-12-28	Unnamed man	Oklahoma (McAlester)	
2001-12-27	Thomas Acker	Virginia (Newport)	
2001-12-24	Norris Patrick Webb (25)	California (Westminster)	
2001-12-23	Robert Clingenpeel (76)	Iowa (Indianola)	
2011-12-23	Charles Crowder (31)	North Carolina (Cherryville)	
2001-12-23	Richard Sharp (53)	California (San Jose)	An advocate for worker's rights and known for his friendly personality, Richard's demeanor changed suddenly after a hospital visit and then a car crash into a tree. A couple of days later, a call to 911 from his wife reported that he had attacked her and was threatening the family with a hammer. After police arrived, Richard was in his front yard staring at the sky, slowly spinning, with wife and kids watching from the door. He was holding a knife and hammer up to the sky, talking to the sky, when he was shot about 10 times from the back by several officers. Richard's wife later initiated a lawsuit for inappropriate action by the police.
2001-12-22	Unnamed man	Michigan (Detroit)	
2001-12-22	Unnamed man (39)	Hawaii (Leilani Estates)	
2001-12-21	Melanie Jones (22)	Virginia (Newport)	Shot after she allegedly ignored orders to drop the gun she was holding.
2001-12-13	Robert Brown (37)	Florida (Orlando)	
2001-12-10	Jake Thomas (19)	Nevada (Owyhee)	
2001-12-08	Gary Brent Claytor	Virginia (Williamsburg)	
2001-12-07	Mark Moore (30)	North Carolina (Gastonia)	
2001-12-07	Unnamed man	Missouri (St. Charles)	
2001-11-23	Steven Michalacos (67)	New York (Brooklyn)	Hit and killed by a NYPD car responding to another scene.
2001-11-08	Bryon Swenson (36)	Texas (Houston)	
2001-11-07	Unnamed man	California (Waukena)	
2001-11-06	Timothy Hood	Georgia (Athens)	Shot after placing a gun to officer's head.
2001-10-29	Robert Bruce Meadours (38)	Texas (Houston)	
2001-10-24	Tayvone Kinney (17)	Ohio (Dayton)	
2001-10-09	Richard Hatcher (19)	New York (Brooklyn)	
2001-10-08	Shannon Vinson (28)	New York (Queens)	Vinson, who was wanted for homicide, was shot in his car by police. He had been pulled over and allegedly reached for a handgun. His girlfriend and her two children were sitting in the backseat
2001-10-03	Rhett Carter Barrington	Texas (Houston)	
2001-09-28	David Eric Medina Diaz	U.S. Virgin Islands (St. Croix)	Following reports of gunshots, an officer shot Medina Diaz in the chest following a fight.
2001-09-28	Jeremy Todd Seifert	Virginia (Norfolk)	
2001-09-26	Peter Aguon Maguadog	Guam (Tamuning)	Maguadog shot and killed his estranged wife and another woman and wounded four others at a clinic before being shot and killed by police.
2001-09-24	Elisei Borlovan (43)	Vermont (Williston)	
2001-09-24	Timothy Terry (22)	Texas (Houston)	
2001-09-21	Stacy Rondell Bostic	Georgia (Athens)	Shot after shooting at officer. Police were responding to report of an armed robbery of a hotel. A man running from the scene matched suspects description and was commanded to stop.
2001-09-20	Gwendulina Brodie (34)	New York (Suffolk)	NYPD detective Ezra Leslie broke into Gwendulina Brodie's home and shot her several times. Brodie was an NYPD sergeant and allegedly had disapproved of a romantic relationship between her sister and Leslie.
2001-09-07	Rudes Chacon Diaz (21)	Texas (Houston)	
2001-09-04	Rolland "Rollie" Rohm (28)	Cass County, Michigan	Shot dead by local police during the standoff at Rainbow Farm.
2001-09-03	Tom Crosslin (46)	Cass County, Michigan	Shot dead by the FBI during the standoff at Rainbow Farm.
2001-08-23	Michael Schatzhuber	Virginia (Chesapeake)	
2001-08-22	Daniel Harris (47)	Ohio (Cleveland)	Harris was shot while grabbing a police officer's gun and refusing to let go, after a car chase with police.
2001-08-13	McLoren Anthony Jones (21)	Texas (Houston)	
2001-08-08	Nelson Martinez	Washington (Bellevue)	Mike Hetle, a Bellevue, Washington police officer, confronted Martinez as he was driving away from the scene of an alleged domestic dispute with his cousin. Hetle was given erroneous information by a dispatcher who claimed that Martinez was known for being a repeat offender for domestic violence. Hetle ordered Martinez, in English, to get out of the car and, in Spanish, to put his hands up. Martinez did not comply and began to pull something from his waistband, which was later found out to be a wallet. Hetle then shot Martinez two times, believing he was in danger
2001-08-04	Dilcia Pena (16)	New York (Brooklyn)	Hit and killed by Joseph Gray (police officer).
2001-08-04	Maria Herrera (24)	New York (Brooklyn)	Hit and killed by Joseph Gray (police officer).
2001-08-04	Leanna Thomas (17)	New York (Brooklyn)	Hit and killed by Joseph Gray (police officer).
2001-08-04	Andy Herrera (4)	New York (Brooklyn)	Hit and killed by Joseph Gray (police officer).
2001-08-01	Haywood Louis Ogburn Jr. (32)	Texas (Houston)	
2001-07-29	Joseph Dwayne Mason (20)	Texas (Houston)	
2001-07-28	Unnamed man (81)	California (San Bernardino)	
2001-07-27	Andrea Nicole Reedy	Virginia (Hampton)	
2001-07-27	Ricky Moore (21)	Ohio (Cincinnati)	
2001-07-26	Unnamed man	Florida (Hialeah)	
2001-07-16	Anthony Jerome Downing	Virginia (Norfolk)	
2001-07-14	Rene Romain	Massachusetts (Boston)	
2001-07-14	Tyron Johnson (30)	California (Bakersfield)	Johnson was killed by Bakersfield Police officers. They were investigating gunshots and chased Johnson. He fired at them several times, striking an officer and a woman. The wounded officer shot and killed Johnson.
2001-07-11	Jerome Walker (57)	Arkansas (DeWitt)	
2001-06-30	Scott Andrew Curtis	Oklahoma (Washita County)	Shot and killed after leading troopers on a car chase.
2001-06-17	Alphaeus Dailey (30)	Florida (North Miami Beach)	Dailey, a paralyzed wheel chair user, was fatally shot while trying to flee police.
2001-06-09	Beau Blain (28)	California (Oxnard)	
2001-06-06	Richard Beatty (55)	Florida (Miami)	
2001-06-03	Asie Rogers (17)	U.S. Virgin Islands (St. John)	Police responded to a domestic dispute and shot Rogers after he allegedly threatened his mother and officers with a knife.
2001-06-03	Jose Antonio Medina	Texas (Houston)	
2001-05-28	Herman Joseph Dartez Jr. (31)	Texas (Houston)	
2001-05-26	Jose Pineda	Massachusetts (Boston)	
2001-05-16	Thomasina Brown (44)	Pennsylvania (Pittsburgh)	Shot by two officers after shooting and killing 37-year-old Carmen Collins.
2001-05-07	Rutilio Gracida Castillo (23)	California (Oxnard)	
2001-05-07	Cleophis Craver (20)	Ohio (Dayton)	
2001-04-30	Nicholas Singleton (18)	Florida (Miami)	
2001-04-11	Mi Young Blain (41)	Texas (Houston)	
2001-04-10	Michael Teklai (27)	New Jersey (Kearny)	Teklai returned to the post office where he formerly worked and stabbed three people with a knife. Officers shot and killed Teklai when he refused to drop his weapons, including three knives and a handgun.
2001-04-07	Timothy Thomas (19)	Ohio (Cincinnati)	
2001-04-03	Justin Ronchetti	Massachusetts (Boston)	
2001-03-27	John Franklin Aycox (36)	Oklahoma (Midwest City)	
2001-03-20	Joseph Fields (46)	New York (Ridge)	Shot after a standoff.
2001-03-17	James Levier (60)	Maine (Scarborough)	
2001-03-11	Dante Meniefield (23)	California (Moreno Valley)	
2001-02-27	Scott Brown (37)	Pennsylvania (Lindenwold)	
2001-02-26	Unnamed man	California (Sunnyvale)	
2001-02-26	Austin Riley (87)	Florida (Miami)	
2001-02-26	Andrena Kitt (21)	Florida (Pensacola)	
2001-02-24	Mark Venuti (36)	New Jersey (Elizabeth)	Officers killed Venuti after he charged at them holding a "dark object" above his head, which turned out to be a bible.
2011-02-23	Joe Anthony Zuniga (24)	Texas (Houston)	
2001-02-23	Robert Tale (39)	Ohio (Dayton)	
2001-02-18	Jose Mendoza (21)	California (Long Beach)	
2001-02-17	Unnamed man	California (San Diego)	
2001-02-16	Gary Baker (30s)	New York (Hornell)	Shot after stabbing his wife to death.
2001-02-14	Joey Kessinger (27)	Tennessee (Nashville)	
2001-02-09	Unnamed man	California (Los Angeles)	
2001-02-07	Antwan Bryant (20)	Kentucky (Louisvillle)	
2001-02-06	Michelle King (39)	California (Fountain Valley)	
2001-02-03	Unnamed man (32)	Colorado (Denver)	
2001-01-29	Corey Paul Rice (30)	Florida (Gainesville)	
2001-01-16	Juliette Alexander (29)	New York (Brooklyn)	Alexander was shot in the head by NYPD Sergeant Martin Peters, the estranged father of her two children. Peters also shot Alexander's friend Nigel Callender, leaving him paralyzed.
2001-01-16	Unnamed man (44)	Michigan (Detroit)	
2001-01-18	Charles Valdez (22)	California (Oxnard)	
2001-01-14	David Geisler (28)	Ohio (Dayton)	
2001-01-12	William Wilkins (29)	California (Oakland)	
2001-01-10	Richard Lopez (17)	California (Oxnard)	
2001-01-05	Unnamed man (39)	Louisiana (Shreveport)	
2001-01-04	Unnamed man (21)	New York (Rochester)	
2001-01-03	Mark Guerrero (33)	Arizona (Tucson)	
2001-01-01	Juan Hernandez Anzaldua (25)	Texas (Belton)	
2001-01-??	Clifford Lewis (18)	Kentucky (Louisville)	

== See also ==
- Death in custody § United States
- Henry A. Wallace Police Crime Public Database
- List of cases of police brutality
- List of countries with annual rates and counts for killings by law enforcement officers
- List of law enforcement officers killed in the line of duty in the United States
- List of law enforcement officers convicted for an on-duty killing in the United States
- List of shootings by US immigration agents
- List of police reforms related to the George Floyd protests
- List of unarmed African Americans killed by law enforcement officers in the United States
- Lists of killings by law enforcement officers
- Police brutality in the United States
- Police misconduct § United States
- Police riot § United States
- Police use of deadly force in the United States
