= Lon Horiuchi =

Former U.S. Army officer and FBI Hostage Rescue Team (HRT) sniper (born 1954)

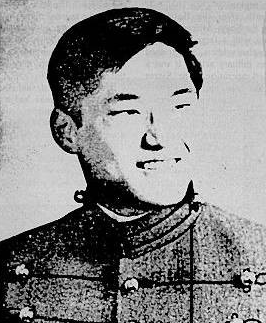
- Horiuchi during his tenure at the USMA, c. 1972–1976
- Born: Lon Tomohisa Horiuchi; June 9, 1954 (age 72); Hawaii, U.S.
- Education: U.S. Military Academy (1976)
- Occupations: LEO Sniper (former), Army officer (former)
- Organization(s): FBI Hostage Rescue Team (1984–2006); United States Army (1976–1984)
- Known for: Involvement with government raids including Ruby Ridge and Waco

Lon Tomohisa Horiuchi (born June 9, 1954) is an American former Federal Bureau of Investigation (FBI) Hostage Rescue Team (HRT) sniper and former United States Army officer who was involved in the 1992 Ruby Ridge standoff and 1993 Waco siege. In 1997, Horiuchi was charged with manslaughter for killing Vicki Weaver at Ruby Ridge, who was unarmed while carrying an infant child. The charges were dismissed due to constitutional supremacy granting federal officers immunity from state prosecution for actions taken within the scope of their duties. Subsequently, the dismissal was reversed on appeal to the Ninth Circuit; however, the then-sitting county prosecutor decided to drop the case.

== Early life and education ==
Horiuchi was born in Hawaii on June 9, 1954 as the son of a U.S. Army officer. He later attended the United States Military Academy at West Point and graduated in 1976. He served as an infantry officer in the U.S. Army and subsequently joined the FBI.

== Ruby Ridge ==
In 1992, while working at sniper position Sierra 4 for the FBI Hostage Rescue Team at Ruby Ridge, Horiuchi fired two shots, first at Randy Weaver, then Weaver's friend Kevin Harris – but this second shot killed the unarmed Vicki Weaver, Randy's wife.

After his first shot hit and wounded Randy Weaver, Horiuchi fired a second shot at Harris as he retreated into a cabin. This shot wounded Harris after striking and killing Vicki Weaver, who was standing in the doorway holding her 10-month-old child.

Following the conclusion of the trial of Randy Weaver and Kevin Harris in 1993, the U.S. Department of Justice (DOJ) created a "Ruby Ridge Task Force" to investigate allegations made by Weaver's defense attorney Gerry Spence. On June 10, 1994, the Task Force delivered its 542-page report to the DOJ Office of Professional Responsibility. The Report stated: "With regard to the two shots fired on August 22, we concluded that the first shot met the standard of 'objective reasonableness' the Constitution requires for the legal use of deadly force but that the second shot did not satisfy that standard."

In 1995, the surviving members of the Weaver family received US$3.1 million (equivalent to $6.6 million in 2025) to settle their civil suit brought against the U.S. government for wrongful deaths of Vicki Weaver and 14-year-old Samuel Weaver, who was killed the day before during an encounter with U.S. Marshals. In the out-of-court settlement, the government did not admit any wrongdoing. In a separate suit, settled by the U.S. government in 2000, Harris received $380,000 (equivalent to $650,000 in 2025).

=== Manslaughter charge ===
In 1997, Boundary County, Idaho Prosecutor Denise Woodbury, with the help of special prosecutor Stephen Yagman, charged Horiuchi in state court with involuntary manslaughter over his killing of Vicki Weaver. The U.S. Attorney filed a notice of removal of the case to federal court, which automatically took effect under the statute for removal jurisdiction where the case was dismissed by U.S. District Judge Edward Lodge on May 14, 1998, who cited the supremacy clause of the Constitution which grants immunity to federal officers acting in the scope of their employment.

The decision to dismiss the charges was reversed by an en banc panel of the Ninth Circuit, which held that enough uncertainty about the facts of the case existed for Horiuchi to stand trial on state manslaughter charges. Ultimately, the then-sitting Boundary County prosecutor, Brett Benson, who had defeated Woodbury in the 2000 election, decided to drop the charges, because he felt it was unlikely the state could prove the case and too much time had passed. Yagman, the special prosecutor, responded that he "could not disagree more with this decision" than he did.

The Ninth Circuit granted Boundary County's motion to dismiss the case against Horiuchi on September 14, 2001.

== Waco ==
On September 13, 1993, Charles Riley, a fellow FBI sniper deployed with Horiuchi during the Waco Siege, claimed that he had heard Horiuchi shooting from sniper position number one (Sierra One), an FBI-held house in front of the compound holding eight snipers, on April 19, 1993. Riley later retracted his statement, saying that he had been misquoted, and that he had only heard snipers at Sierra One announce that shots had been fired by Branch Davidians. Riley later clarified that he had heard a radio report from Sierra One that someone at that position had witnessed gunfire from within the compound.

The Committee on Government reform notes that "There is no evidence that HRT snipers stationed at a house (designated the Sierra One sniper position) across the Double EE Ranch Road from the compound fired shots on April 19, 1993."

Three of the twelve expended .308 caliber casings that the Texas Rangers reported finding in the house were at Horiuchi's position. However, officials maintained that they were left behind from the earlier use of the house by the Bureau of Alcohol, Tobacco, Firearms and Explosives snipers on February 28, 1993. The recovered casings at the house were tested and identified by the Texas Rangers and the Office of Special Counsel, matching them to weapons used by the Bureau of Alcohol, Tobacco and Firearms on February 28, 1993 and not those used by the FBI.

For the five months following the Waco inferno, Timothy McVeigh worked at gun shows and handed out free cards printed with Horiuchi's name and address, "in the hope that somebody in the Patriot movement would assassinate the sharpshooter". He wrote hate mail to the sniper, suggesting that "what goes around, comes around". McVeigh considered targeting Horiuchi, or a member of his family, before settling on the Oklahoma City bombing.

== Later life ==
Horiuchi retired from the FBI in October 2006, with the job title of FBI Program Manager and Contracting Officer's Technical Representative (COTR).
