= Randy Weaver =

American survivalist (1948–2022)

- Mugshot, taken January 17, 1991
- Born: January 3, 1948; Villisca, Iowa, U.S.
- Died: May 11, 2022 (aged 74); U.S.
- Other name: Pete Weaver
- Education: Iowa Central Community College (dropped out); University of Northern Iowa (dropped out)
- Known for: Ruby Ridge siege
- Spouses: Vicki Jordison (m. 1971; died 1992) Linda Gross (m. 1999)
- Children: 4
- Military career
- Allegiance: United States
- Branch: United States Army
- Service years: 1968–1970
- Rank: Sergeant
- Awards: National Defense Service Medal

Signature
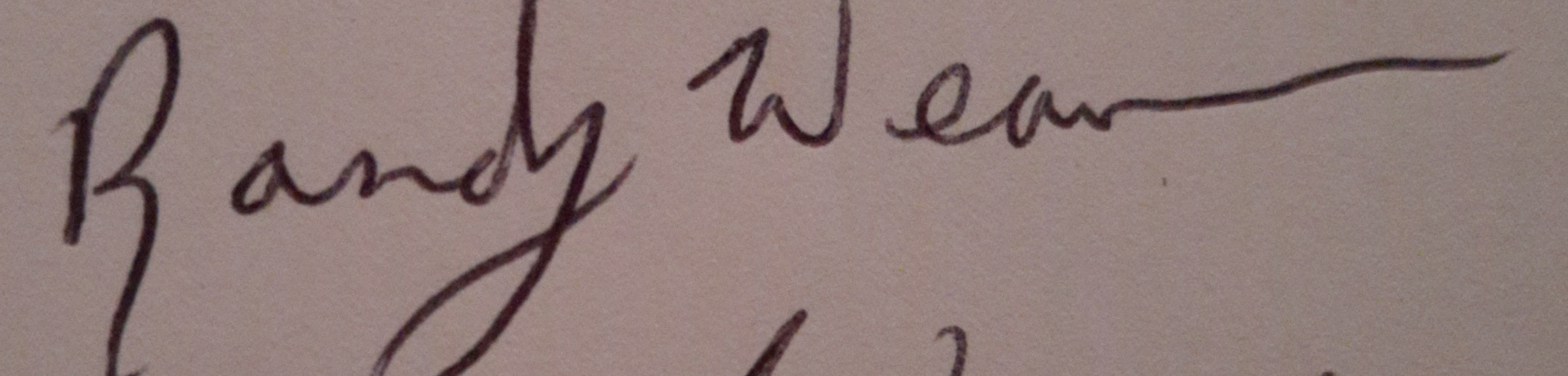

Randall Claude Weaver (January 3, 1948 – May 11, 2022) was an American survivalist and Green Beret. He was a central figure in the 1992 Ruby Ridge standoff with federal law enforcement at his cabin near Naples, Idaho, during which his wife, son and family dog were killed. Weaver was charged with murder, conspiracy, and assault as well as other crimes. He was acquitted of most of the charges, but was convicted of failing to appear in court on a previous weapons charge and sentenced to 18 months in prison. He and his family eventually received a total of $3.1 million in compensation for the killing of his wife and son by federal agents.

== Early life ==
Randy Weaver was born on January 3, 1948, to Clarence and Wilma Weaver, a farming couple in Villisca, Iowa. He was one of four children. The Weavers were deeply religious and had difficulty finding a denomination that matched their views; they often moved around among evangelical, Presbyterian, and Baptist churches.

After graduating from Jefferson High School in 1966, he attended Iowa Central Community College for two years. In 1968, he dropped out to enlist in the United States Army during the height of the Vietnam War. He was stationed at Fort Bragg in North Carolina, where he served as a Green Beret.

In 1970, during a visit to his hometown while on leave, Weaver met his future wife Victoria "Vicki" Jordison. He introduced himself as "Pete", rather than his "hated" given name Randall. He was discharged at the rank of sergeant on October 8, 1971, and married Vicki the following month.

== Ruby Ridge siege ==
=== Background ===
A month after leaving the Army, Randy Weaver and Vicki Jordison married in a ceremony at the First Congregationalist Church in Fort Dodge, Iowa, in November 1971. After a semester at the University of Northern Iowa, Randy dropped out after finding well-paying work at a local John Deere factory. Vicki worked first as a secretary and then as a homemaker.

Around 1978, partially as a result of reading the 1970 book The Late Great Planet Earth, the couple began to harbor more Christian fundamentalist beliefs, with Vicki believing that the apocalypse was imminent. To follow Vicki's vision of her family surviving the apocalypse away from what they saw as a corrupt civilization, the Weaver family moved to a 20-acre (8-hectare) property in remote Boundary County, Idaho, in 1983 and built a cabin there. They paid $5,000 in cash ($13,000 in 2024) and traded their moving truck for the land, valued at $500 an acre.

In 1988, Weaver decided to run for county sheriff by using the slogan "Get out of jail – free" and he was adamant about his decision not to pay taxes.

While the Weavers subscribed to ideas that broadly fell under the category of Christian Identity, their beliefs were still different. Like many in that movement, Vicki Weaver developed a set of beliefs which were based on her adherence to Old Covenant Laws, and her family referred to God as Yahweh (see Sacred Name Movement). They also believed themselves to be Israelites.

In 1989, Weaver met Kenneth Fadeley at a meeting of the white supremacist group Aryan Nations. Fadeley was actually an undercover ATF agent investigating the Aryan Nation complex under the alias "Gus Magisano". Weaver agreed to sell Fadeley two sawed-off shotguns, and was recorded on tape saying he could supply Fadelay with four or five illegal shotguns a week. In December 1990, Weaver received felony weapons charges in connection with the 1989 transaction. During the initial encounter with Fadeley, the Weaver family relocated from a rental house to a cabin near Ruby Ridge, Idaho, in the Selkirk Mountains. After charges were pressed against her husband, Vicki Weaver wrote to U.S. Attorney Maurice O. Ellsworth, addressing him as "Servant of the Queen of Babylon" and writing, "The stink of your lawless government has reached Heaven, the abode of Yahweh our Yashua", and "Whether we live or whether we die, we will not bow to your evil commandments."

At the time of the Ruby Ridge siege, the Weavers had four children: Sara, 16; Samuel, 14; Rachel, 10; and Elisheba, 10 months. Vicki homeschooled the children.

=== Siege ===
Ruby Ridge was the site of an 11-day police standoff in 1992 in Boundary County, Idaho, near Naples. It began on August 21, when deputies of the United States Marshals Service (USMS) initiated action to apprehend and arrest Randy Weaver under a bench warrant after his failure to appear on firearms charges.

Weaver refused to surrender and remained at home with his family and friend Kevin Harris. The Hostage Rescue Team of the Federal Bureau of Investigation (FBI HRT) became involved as the siege developed.

During the Marshals Service reconnoiter of the Weaver property, six Marshals encountered Harris, and Randy's 14-year-old son, Sammy Weaver, in the woods near the family cabin. A shootout took place. Marshals shot the Weavers' dog Striker, then shot Sammy in the back as he ran away, killing him. During the firefight, Harris shot Deputy U.S. Marshal, William Francis Degan, in the chest, resulting in Degan's death.

On August 22, 1992 FBI sniper/observers in the Hostage Rescue Team were dispatched to Ruby Ridge. The team used specified "Rules of Engagement" which allowed them to shoot any armed adult male exiting the cabin.

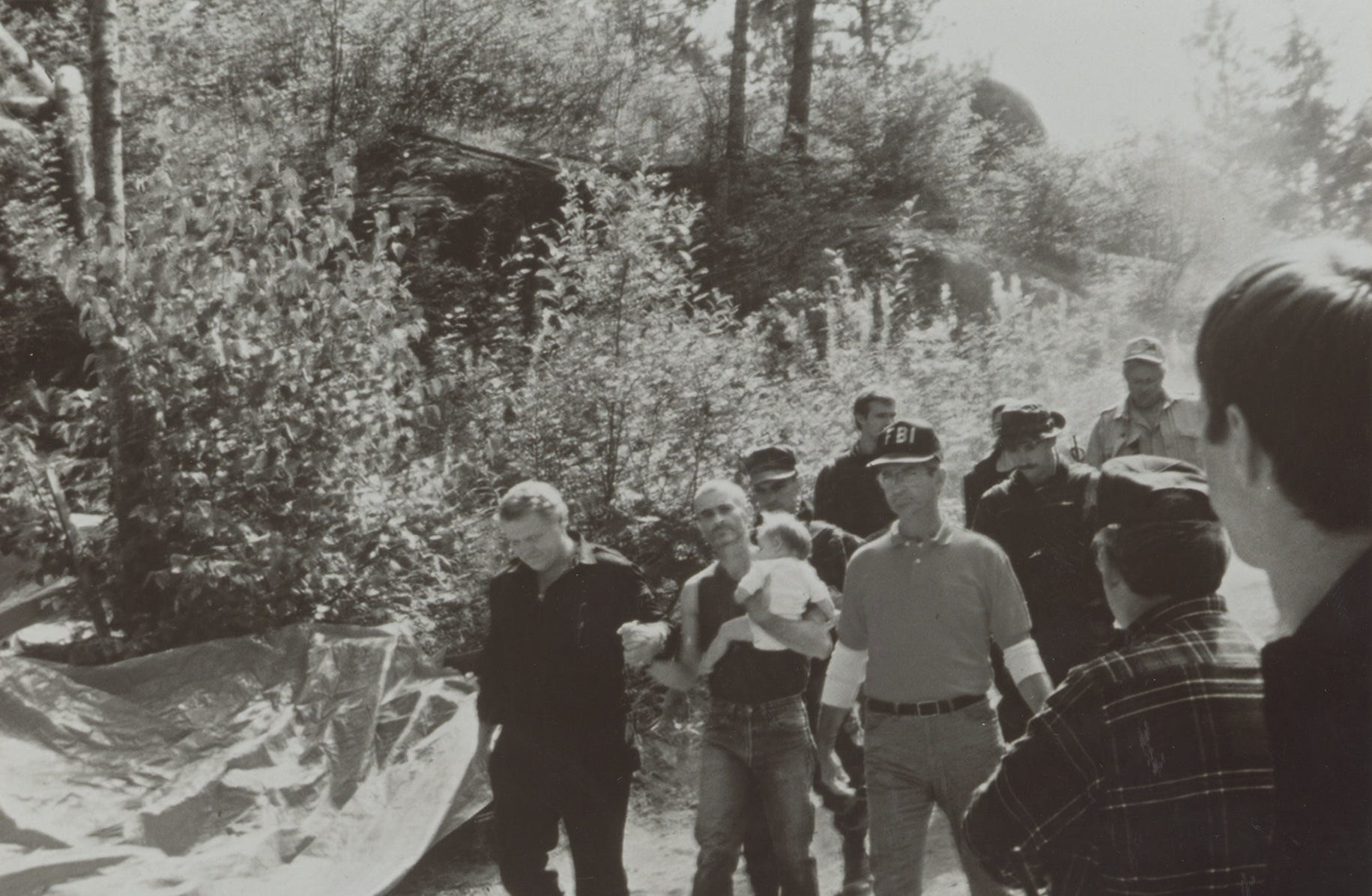
Weaver, holding his daughter, comes down the mountain and surrenders

In the subsequent siege of the Weaver residence, led by the FBI, Weaver's wife Vicki was shot and killed by an FBI sniper while standing in her home holding her 10-month-old daughter. Harris was critically wounded and almost died during the subsequent standoff. Weaver was shot once; he was not holding a weapon at the time. All casualties occurred in the first two days of the operation. The siege and standoff were ultimately resolved by civilian negotiator, Bo Gritz, who was instrumental in getting Weaver to allow Harris to get medical attention. Harris surrendered and was arrested on August 30. Weaver and his three daughters surrendered the next day after being convinced by Gritz that there was no other sensible solution.

=== Aftermath ===
Weaver was charged with multiple crimes relating to the Ruby Ridge incident — a total of ten counts, including the original firearms charges. Attorney Gerry Spence handled Weaver's defense, and successfully argued that Weaver's actions were justifiable as self-defense. Spence did not call any witnesses for the defense, rather focusing on attacking the credibility of FBI agents and forensic technicians. The judge dismissed two counts after hearing prosecution witness testimony. The jury acquitted Weaver of all remaining charges except two, one of which the judge set aside. He was found guilty of one count, failure to appear, for which he was fined $10,000, and sentenced to 18 months in prison. He was credited with time served plus an additional three months, and was then released. Kevin Harris was acquitted of all criminal charges.

In August 1995, the US government avoided trial on a civil lawsuit filed by the Weavers by awarding the three surviving daughters $1,000,000 each, and Randy Weaver $100,000 over the deaths of Sammy and Vicki Weaver.

== Later life ==
Weaver testified about his racial beliefs before a U.S. Senate Judiciary subcommittee in 1995: "I am not a hateful racist the way most people understand that, but I believe that if there is separation of the races, scripturally speaking, that is what I believe is right. It sounds like an impossible task and most likely is, but I believe that people of every race should be proud of who they are and what they are. There are good people in every race; there are bad people in every race."

In 1995, Weaver was interviewed by New York Times reporter Ken Fuson and expressed regret about not appearing in court for his 1991 gun charge: "I'm not totally without fault in this."

In April 1996, Weaver accompanied Bo Gritz to Jordan, Montana, where Gritz was to attempt to negotiate a conclusion to the Montana Freemen standoff. However, Weaver was not allowed by the FBI to enter the Freemen's holdout.

In 1998, Weaver published The Federal Siege at Ruby Ridge: In Our Own Words, which he partly sold in person at gun shows.

In 1999, Weaver married Linda Gross, a legal secretary, in Jefferson, Iowa.

On June 18, 2007, Weaver participated in a press conference with tax protesters Edward and Elaine Brown on the front porch of their home in Plainfield, New Hampshire. He declared, "I ain't afraid of dying no more. I'm curious about the afterlife, and I'm an atheist."

== Death ==
Weaver's daughter, Sara, posted online that he had died on May 11, 2022, after being sick since at least mid-April. A cause of death was not given. He was 74 years old.

== Appearance in media ==
A CBS miniseries about the Ruby Ridge incident, titled Ruby Ridge: An American Tragedy, aired on May 19 and 21, 1996. It was based on the book Every Knee Shall Bow by reporter Jess Walter. It starred Laura Dern as Vicki, Kirsten Dunst as Sara, and Randy Quaid as Randy. Later that year, the television series was adapted into a full-length TV movie, The Siege at Ruby Ridge.

PBS' American Experience aired an episode titled "Ruby Ridge" on February 14, 2017.

== See also ==
- The Covenant, the Sword, and the Arm of the Lord
- FBI Critical Incident Response Group
- Rainbow Farm
- Timothy McVeigh
- Waco siege
