= Ruby Ridge (northeastern Boundary County, Idaho) =

Mountain ridge in Idaho, US

- Location within Idaho Location within the United States

Highest point
- Elevation: 6,207 ft (1,892 m)
- Coordinates: 48.9146094°N 116.1007168°W

Geography
- Location: Kaniksu National Forest
- Country: United States
- State: Idaho
- County: Boundary
- Topo map: USGS: Canuck Peak

Geology
- Mountain type: Homoclinal ridge

Ruby Ridge is a 6,207-foot (1,892 m) mountain ridge in the Kaniksu National Forest (administered as part of the Idaho Panhandle National Forests) in northeastern Boundary County, Idaho, United States.

The landform is most notable for being confused with another Ruby Ridge in the same county, but about 26 miles (42 km) south–southwest. The other Ruby Ridge has an elevation 4,616 feet (1,407 m), is also located within the Kaniksu National Forest, and is the only other landform so named within the United States. (There is a third landform of the same name, located in Alberta, Canada, about 118 miles [190 km] to the east–northeast). The other, more proximate, Ruby Ridge gained notoriety after an armed standoff that occurred nearby in late August 1992, in which two civilians and one officer of the United States Marshals Service were killed.
