= Christopher Whitcomb =

American novelist

- Born: January 15, 1959 (age 67)
- Occupation: Author

Christopher Whitcomb (born January 15, 1959) is an American author and former member of the FBI's Hostage Rescue Team. He also appeared as an "expert" on the NBC game show Identity.

== Career ==
Before joining the FBI, Whitcomb worked as a press secretary and speechwriter for Congressman Silvio O. Conte

Whitcomb spent 15 years with the FBI as a special agent from 1987 to 2002 and worked on many high-profile cases. Whitcomb joined the FBI Hostage Rescue Team in 1991 where he served as a sniper, assaulter, breacher and tactical operations officer until 1997. Whitcomb participated in operations at the Waco siege, LA Riots, Ruby Ridge and Kosovo. He was one of seven snipers involved in the killing of Vicki Weaver at Ruby Ridge. His final assignment with the FBI was as the director of strategic information management within the Critical Incident Response Group.

== Bibliography ==
- Cold Zero: Inside the Hostage Rescue Team (2001) - ISBN 0-552-14788-5
- Black: A novel (2005) - ISBN 0-446-61183-2
- White: A novel (2006) - ISBN 0-446-61754-7
- Anonymous Male: A Life Among Spies (2025) - ISBN 0-593-59700-1
- Broken Plea: The Explosive Search for Truth Behind the Idaho Murders (2026) - ISBN 1-400-25715-8
