= Naples, Idaho =

Unincorporated community in the state of Idaho, United States

Naples within Idaho

Naples is a small unincorporated community in Boundary County, in the far north of Idaho, United States. It lies 11 miles (18 kilometers) south of the city of Bonners Ferry and 23 mi (37 km) north of Sandpoint, on U.S. Routes 2/95 in the Rocky Mountains. It is very close to the US-Canada border. The ZIP Code for Naples is 83847.

Naples is near the land features of Caribou Ridge and Ruby Creek. The Ruby Ridge standoff of 1992, between federal agencies and the Randy Weaver family, took place about 8 miles (13 km) from the city. It resulted in the deaths of three people, including a deputy US marshal and two of the Weaver family.

It was named after the Italian city, from which many immigrant laborers had come who worked on building the first rail line through the region around 1890.

== Geography ==
The city has a total area of 872.79 sq mi (2,260.5 km^{2}), of which, 868.31 sq mi (2,248.9 km^{2}) is land and 4.48 sq mi (11.6 km^{2}) is water.

Climate data for Naples
Month	Jan	Feb	Mar	Apr	May	Jun	Jul	Aug	Sep	Oct	Nov	Dec	Year
Record high °F (°C)	55 (13)	63 (17)	75 (24)	89 (32)	95 (35)	105 (41)	104 (40)	106 (41)	97 (36)	84 (29)	67 (19)	57 (14)	105 (41)
Mean daily maximum °F (°C)	34 (1)	39 (4)	50 (10)	61 (16)	70 (21)	76 (24)	84 (29)	84 (29)	73 (23)	57 (14)	42 (6)	32 (0)	58.5 (14.7)
Mean daily minimum °F (°C)	23 (−5)	24 (−4)	29 (−2)	34 (1)	41 (5)	48 (9)	51 (11)	50 (10)	42 (6)	34 (1)	29 (−2)	21 (−6)	35.5 (1.9)
Record low °F (°C)	−29 (−34)	−25 (−32)	−12 (−24)	10 (−12)	17 (−8)	23 (−5)	32 (0)	28 (−2)	15 (−9)	8 (−13)	−13 (−25)	−33 (−36)	−33 (−36)
Average precipitation inches (mm)	2.56 (65)	1.60 (41)	1.66 (42)	1.37 (35)	1.76 (45)	1.68 (43)	0.74 (19)	0.69 (18)	1.02 (26)	1.65 (42)	2.92 (74)	2.87 (73)	20.52 (523)
Average snowfall inches (cm)	16.0 (41)	10.5 (27)	3.4 (8.6)	0.5 (1.3)	0 (0)	0 (0)	0 (0)	0 (0)	0 (0)	0.5 (1.3)	9.2 (23)	22.0 (56)	62.1 (158.2)
Average precipitation days (≥ 0.01 inch)	12.6	10.6	9.7	9.2	11.0	10.0	7.0	6.0	7.0	9.4	13.8	14.4	120.7
Average snowy days (≥ 0.1 inch)	7.8	4.9	2.0	0.3	0	0	0	0	0	0.4	3.5	9.0	27.9
Source: The Weather Channel
