= Stephen Yagman =

American lawyer

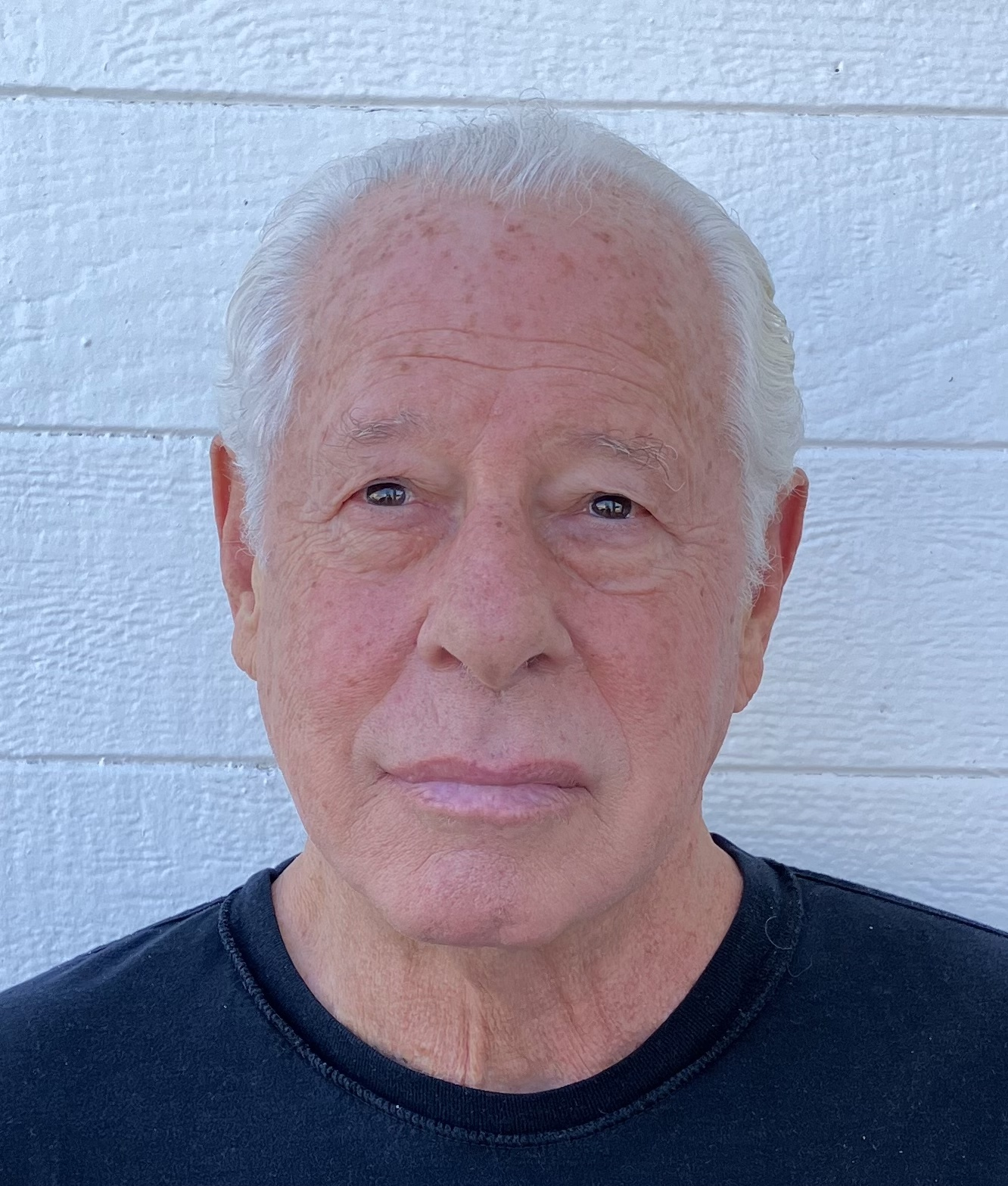
- Born: December 19, 1944 (age 81); Brooklyn, New York
- Education: Long Island University (BA); New York University (MA); Fordham University School of Law (JD)
- Known for: Civil and political rights and constitutional law

Stephen Yagman (born December 19, 1944) is an American federal civil rights lawyer, who also handles criminal defense and habeas corpus matters. He has a reputation for being an exceptionally zealous advocate in cases regarding allegations of police brutality. He has argued hundreds of federal civil rights cases before a jury, and has been involved in over a hundred and fifty federal appeals and certiorari petitions before the United States Supreme Court.

Disbarred following a federal conviction for tax evasion, Yagman was later reinstated and continues his legal work.

== Youth, education and early career ==
Stephen Yagman was born in 1944 in the Brighton Beach section of Brooklyn, New York to working-class parents. His father was a dental mechanic and his mother was a secretary. Yagman attended Abraham Lincoln High School. After attending the State University of New York at Buffalo, he then graduated from Long Island University in Brooklyn.

Yagman received a B.A. in American History, with co-majors in philosophy and political science. He later earned an M.A. in philosophy from New York University, where his graduate advisor and mentor was Professor Sidney Hook, and his master's dissertation was on the Fifth Amendment's self-incrimination clause. He attended Fordham University School of Law, receiving a J.D. in 1974, where he was on the dean's list and received the Jurisprudence Award of the Guild of Catholic Lawyers. During graduate school and law school, he taught (English, remedial reading, social studies, economics, and Spanish) in the New York City public school system in Harlem and Bedford Stuyvesant, in Title I (lower socioeconomic) schools, from 1967 to 1974. From 1967 until their divorce in 1994, he was married to Marion R. Yagman, with whom he practiced law for many years (1978–2021).

== Legal career ==
Yagman's legal career began before he graduated, as an attorney-intern with the New York City Legal Aid Society. Yagman was mentored by former N.Y. City Legal Aid Society director Martin Erdmann, attorney Charles Garry, house counsel to the Black Panther Party, and U.S. Attorney General Ramsey Clark. After graduating law school, he was appointed by New York State Attorney General Louis J. Lefkowitz to the office of the New York State Attorney General as a Special Assistant Attorney General, assigned as an Assistant Special Prosecutor for Nursing Homes, in the Manhattan office of the Special State Prosecutor for Nursing Homes.

In 1986, Yagman successfully challenged a proposed nationwide suspension of federal jury trials due to budget shortfalls, in Armster v. U.S. Dist. Ct., 792 F.2d 1423 (9th Cir. 1986). In a unanimous opinion in a related proceeding, Armster v. U.S. Dist. Ct, 817 F.2d 480 (9th Cir. 1987), Judge Stephen R. Reinhardt said, "Yagman's vigilance in the protection of his clients' constitutional rights served all citizens. His fortitude and tenacity in the service of his civil rights clients exemplifies the highest traditions of the bar."

Praise for Yagman from the bench has not been universal; the federal Ninth Circuit Court of Appeals has twice sanctioned him. In a 1986 per curiam opinion, the panel found Yagman's three-and-a-half-page brief in the case "fails to meet the requirements of a minimally acceptable appeal." Among its failings were an exceedingly superficial statement of the facts in the case ("It does not even tell us who won or how"), failure to use a tan cover as required by court rules, photocopying a page in a way that made it difficult to read, and a poorly-written legal argument that nevertheless was "irresponsibly frivolous". Concluding that "Yagman's wholesale disregard of the rules of appellate procedure — and those of common sense — makes it impossible for us or opposing counsel to deal with the merits of appellant's contentions", the panel assessed the respondent's fees and double costs to Yagman. In a case the following year another per curiam Ninth Circuit panel noted that Yagman's brief in another case demonstrated awareness that the allegation of frivolousness he made about the respondents in the instant case was itself frivolous and again assessed him costs.

In January 2002, Yagman brought the first case seeking habeas corpus relief for Guantanamo Bay detainees, Coalition of Clergy, Lawyers & Professors v. George Walker Bush & Donald Rumsfeld, 310 F.3d 1153 (9th Cir. 2002).

On December 18, 2003, Yagman won the first case in which it was declared that Guantanamo detainees were entitled to seek habeas corpus relief in United States courts. Gherebi v. Bush & Rumsfeld, 374 F.3d 727 (9th Cir. 2004).

On November 12, 1997, Yagman was sworn in by U.S. District Judge Robert M. Takasugi as Special Prosecutor for the State of Idaho to prosecute FBI sniper Lon T. Horiuchi in the August 22, 1992 Ruby Ridge killing of Vicki Weaver. In 2001, Yagman won a decision from the U.S. Court of Appeals for the Ninth Circuit declaring that federal law enforcement agents did not enjoy sovereign immunity and could be prosecuted criminally for state law homicide. Idaho v. Horiuchi, 253 F.3d 359 (9th Cir. 2001) (en banc).

In County of Los Angeles v. U.S. Dist. Ct. (Forsyth v. Block), 223 F.3d 990 (9th Cir. 2000), federal Ninth Circuit Chief Judge Alex Kozinski noted that Yagman "has a formidable reputation as a plaintiff's advocate in police misconduct cases; defendants in such cases may find it advantageous to remove him as an opponent." Some of his most notorious cases involved the Los Angeles Police Department (LAPD) and the Los Angeles County Sheriff's Department. He was particularly despised by LAPD officers, even though he sometimes represented them in suits against their employer. According to officers deposed in suits, Yagman would tell them before he began to question them that the lavish furnishings of his Wilshire Boulevard office had been paid for with judgements won against the LAPD and individual officers. He also had them testify as they looked straight across the room at an oil painting of a uniformed officer with a nose elongated like Pinocchio's.

Yagman lodged complaints of judicial misconduct against U.S. District Judge Manuel Lawrence Real which, according to one commentator, "were at the center of the controversy over the effectiveness of the federal judicial disciplinary system and exerted a uniquely powerful influence on subsequent attempts at reform." The United States Judicial Conference cited the Yagman disciplinary case in adopting its 2008 nationwide procedures for handling complaints of misconduct against federal judges. In his 2011 book, Lawyers on Trial, UCLA School of Law Professor of Law Emeritus Richard L. Abel rated Yagman as a "highly competent, dedicated lawyer who is a champion of unpopular causes".

Yagman has tried over 200 federal civil rights actions to jury verdict and has argued over 150 federal appeals and certiorari petitions to the United States Supreme Court.

== Criminal conviction ==
Yagman was convicted of one count of tax evasion, one count of bankruptcy fraud, and 17 counts of money laundering, six of which later were dismissed by the judge, on August 23, 2007. Yagman was convicted of "attempting to avoid payment of more than $100,000 in federal taxes", and he was sentenced to three years in federal prison. Yagman also failed to pay "significant amounts of federal payroll taxes" for his then-law firm, Yagman & Yagman, P.C. Although Yagman claimed he was singled out as retaliation, an appeals court upheld his conviction. Yagman was disbarred by the State Bar of California on December 22, 2010.

Yagman served 29 months in federal prison and then worked as a paralegal and UCLA Law School lecturer for 11 years before, at age 76, passing the California bar exam again and winning decisions from both the California State Bar Court and the California Supreme Court (unanimous) that reinstated his license to practice law, in 2021.

"Yagman has proven by clear and convincing evidence the requisite good moral character for reinstatement [to the California Bar], comprising 'overwhelming[] proof of reform . . . Which we could with confidence lay before the world in justification of a judgment again installing him in the profession.'" On June 11, 2021, Yagman again began to practice law.

He also was reinstated to the Bar of the U.S. District Court for the Central District of California by its chief judge, in 2021. He currently practices federal civil rights law and prosecutes cases for homeless clients, as well as for victims of police brutality, jail and prison abuses, and racial profiling.

Yagman, now 80, has resumed taking cases against police and the government. As class counsel, Yagman represents all of the homeless people in the City of Los Angeles, the County of Los Angeles, the City of Santa Barbara, and the County of Santa Barbara, in five different putative class actions.

== UCLA ==
In 2007, after Yagman's convictions, he was invited to co-teach and taught courses at UCLA Law School on law, morality, and social justice and on police brutality, with professor Frances Olsen.

== Writings ==
Yagman has written two national legal practice books, Section 1983 Federal Jury Practice and Instructions (West Publishing, 1998, ISBN 0-314-22826-8), and Police Misconduct and Civil Rights, Federal Jury Practice and Instructions (Thomson Reuters West, 2002, ISBN 0-314-10293-0), a play, Guantanamo, Act IV (Beyond Baroque, 2004), and hundreds of newspaper columns.

== Sources ==
- Los Angeles Reader, “L.A.P.D. Death Squad”, April 10, 1992, cover
- Los Angeles New Times, “Cop Cruncher”, October 2, 1997, cover
- Los Angeles Times Magazine, “One Angry Man”, June 28, 1998, cover
- California LawBusiness, “Sympathy for the Devil”, November 6, 2000, cover
- Jerome Herbert Skolnick and James J. Fyfe, Above the Law, Police and the Excessive Use of Force (Free Press, 1993), pp. 17–18, 146–64, 203.
