= Ruby Ridge standoff =

1992 siege and shootout in Idaho, US

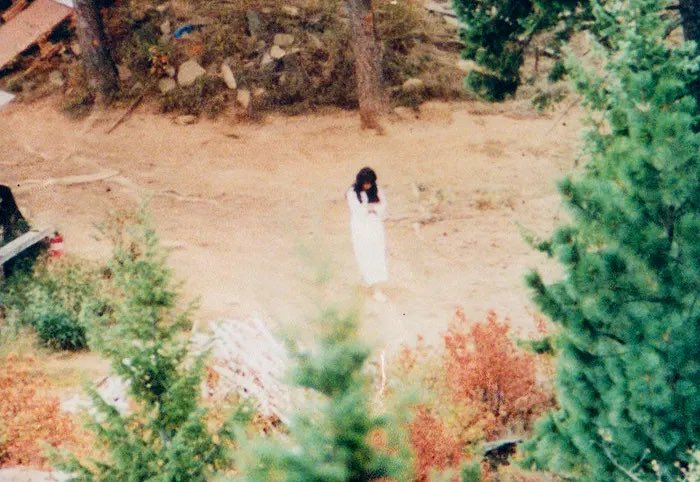
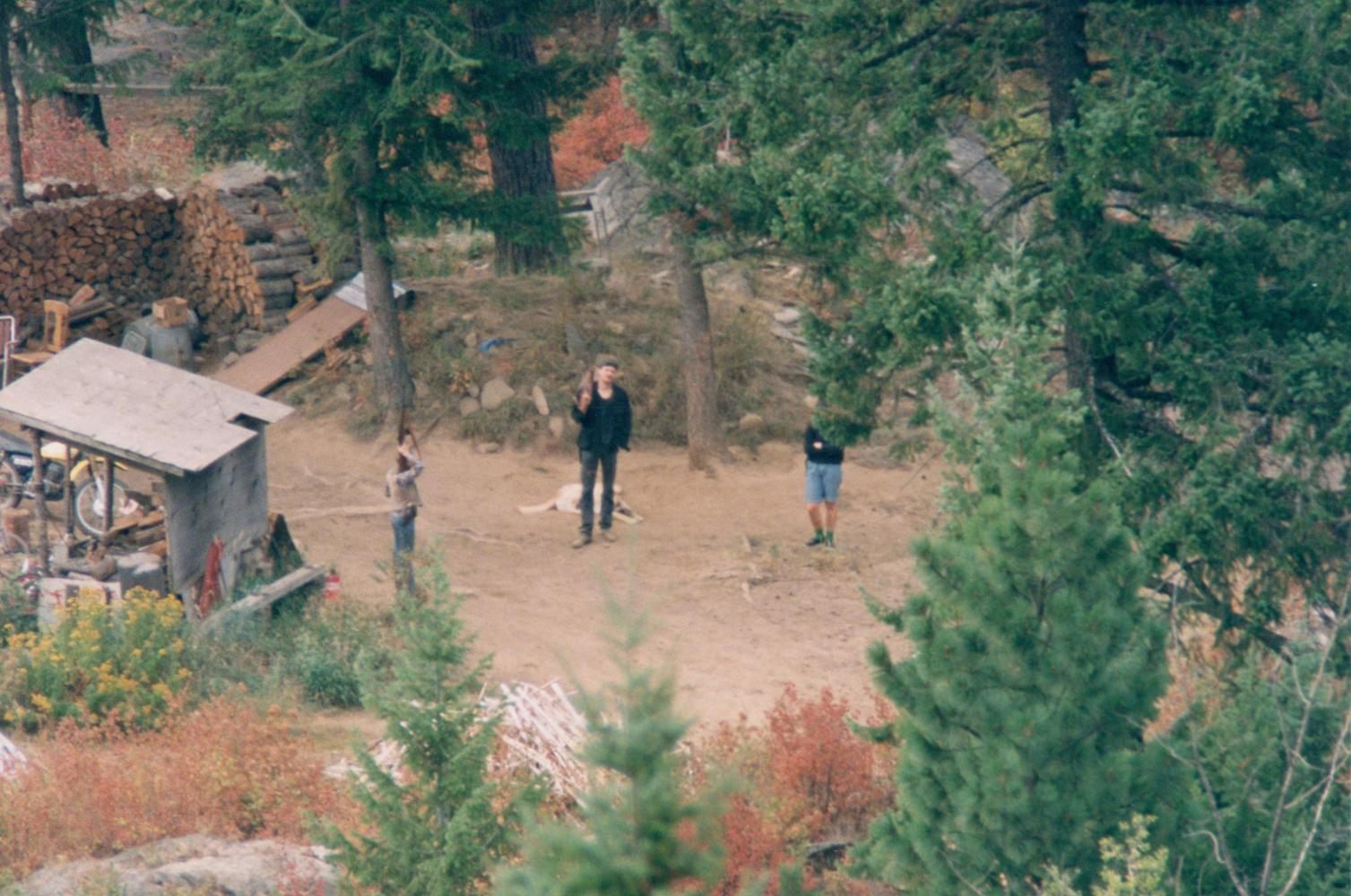
- Vicki Weaver as seen from a USMS surveillance position USMS surveillance photo showing from left to right, Sara Weaver, Kevin Harris and Sammy Weaver. Both photos taken on August 21, 1992
- Date: August 21–31, 1992
- Location: Near Naples, Idaho; 48°37′14″N 116°25′59″W
- Caused by: Execution of bench warrant on Randy Weaver for failure to appear in court
- Result: Deaths of Deputy U.S. Marshal W. F. Degan, Samuel Weaver (juvenile), Vicki Weaver, and Striker (dog); Prosecution of Randy Weaver and Kevin Harris (both later acquitted); Civil suits against the US Government

Parties
Randy Weaver: Close family friend; Kevin Harris	United States: U.S. Marshals; USBP; ATF; FBI; HRT; USSS; Idaho Army National Guard; State of Idaho: ISP

Casualties and losses
2 killed 2 wounded	1 U.S. Marshal killed
- Location in the United States Location in Idaho

The Ruby Ridge standoff was the siege of the Weaver family home in Boundary County, Idaho, in August 1992. On August 21, deputies of the United States Marshals Service (USMS) came to arrest Randy Weaver under a bench warrant for his failure to appear on federal firearms charges. The charges stemmed from Weaver's sale of a sawed-off shotgun to an undercover federal informant.

During a pre-arrest surveillance operation, U.S. Marshal Art Roderick shot Weaver's dog when it ran at them and then pointed his rifle at Weaver's 14-year-old son, Samuel, who was allegedly armed. Samuel fired at the marshals, and was shot in the back and killed by the team. In the ensuing exchange of fire, Weaver's friend Kevin Harris shot and killed Deputy Marshal William Francis Degan Jr. Subsequently, Weaver, Harris and members of Weaver's immediate family refused to surrender. The Hostage Rescue Team of the Federal Bureau of Investigation (FBI HRT) became involved as the siege was mounted. In the standoff, FBI sniper Lon Horiuchi shot Weaver, then shot Harris, but the second shot also hit and killed Weaver's wife Vicki blindly through a doorway. The conflict was ultimately resolved by civilian negotiators, including veteran activist Bo Gritz, who eventually convinced them to surrender. Harris surrendered and was arrested on August 30; Weaver and his three daughters surrendered the next day.

Extensive litigation followed. Initially, Randy Weaver and Harris were tried on a variety of federal criminal charges, including first-degree murder for the death of Degan. In the successful defense, Weaver's attorney Gerry Spence accused the agencies that were involved of criminal wrongdoing, in particular the FBI, the USMS, the Bureau of Alcohol, Tobacco, and Firearms (ATF), and the United States Attorney's Office (USAO) for Idaho. Harris and Weaver were acquitted of all the siege-related charges, and Weaver was only found guilty of violating his bail terms and of failing to appear for a court hearing, both related to the original federal firearms charges. The Weaver family and Harris both filed civil suits against the federal government in response to the firefight and the siege. In August 1995, the Weavers won a combined out-of-court settlement of $3.1 million; Harris was awarded a $380,000 settlement in September 2000. In 1997, a Boundary County prosecutor indicted Horiuchi for the manslaughter of Vicki, but the county's new prosecutor controversially closed the case, claiming he would be unlikely to secure a conviction.

The behavior of government agents during these events drew intense scrutiny. At the end of Weaver's trial, the Department of Justice's Office of Professional Responsibility formed the Ruby Ridge Task Force (RRTF) in an attempt to investigate Spence's charges. The resulting report raised questions about all of the participating agencies' conduct and policies. Another inquiry was led by the Senate Subcommittee on Terrorism, Technology, and Government Information, which held hearings between September 6 and October 19, 1995. It issued a report in which it called for reforms in federal law enforcement to prevent a repeat of the losses of life at Ruby Ridge and to restore the public's confidence. Several documentaries and books were produced on the siege.

The actions of government and state law enforcement at Ruby Ridge and during the Waco siege roughly six months later were both cited by the terrorists Timothy McVeigh and Terry Nichols as their primary motivations to carry out the Oklahoma City bombing in 1995.

== Geography ==
Ruby Ridge is the southernmost of four ridges that extend east from Bottleneck/Roman Nose mountain toward the Kootenai River. Caribou Ridge lies north of it, and the area between them drains into the Ruby Creek. Weaver insisted that his cabin, located north of the creek, was on Caribou Ridge, and that "Ruby Ridge" was a press invention. Both ridge names predate the Weavers' arrival, as noted in a Forest Service report on the 1967 Sundance Fire. The standoff occurred approximately ten miles (16 km) from the nearest incorporated city of Bonners Ferry and approximately thirty miles (48 km) south of the border with Canada (British Columbia).

== Development ==
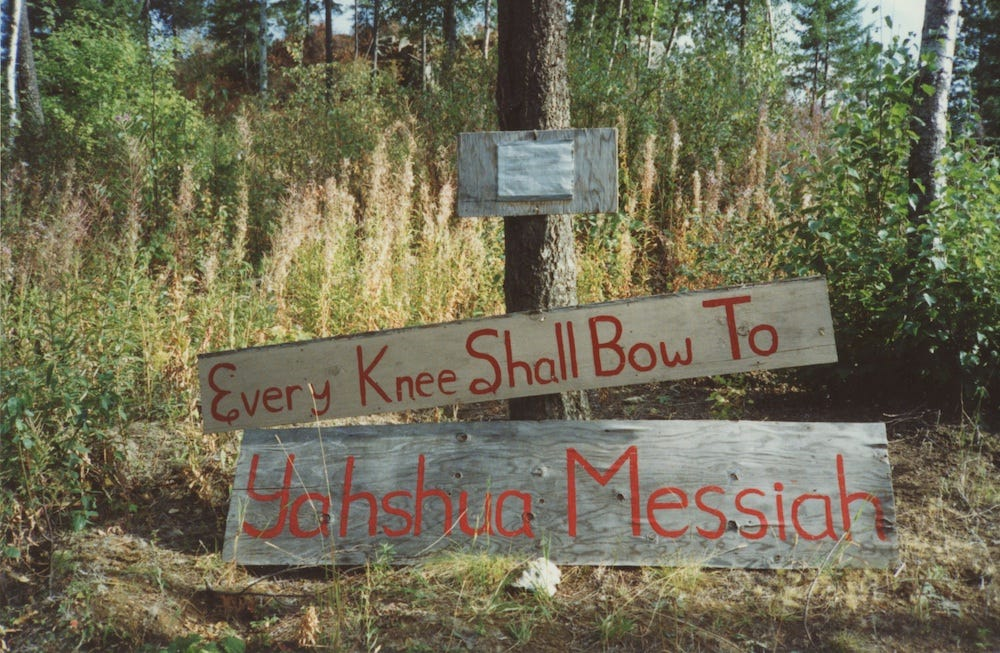
A prominent sign on the Weavers' property showing their religious views

Randy Weaver, a former Iowa factory worker and U.S. Army soldier, moved with his wife and four children from Iowa to northern Idaho during the 1980s so he could "home-school his children and escape what he and his wife Vicki saw as a corrupted world." In 1978, Vicki, the religious leader of the family, began to have recurrent dreams of living on a mountaintop and believed that the apocalypse was imminent. After the birth of their son, Samuel, the Weavers began selling their belongings and visited the Amish to learn how to live without electricity. They bought twenty acres (8 ha) of land on Ruby Ridge in 1983 and began building a cabin; the property was in Boundary County on a hillside on Ruby Creek opposite Caribou Ridge, northwest of nearby Naples.

In 1984, Randy Weaver and his neighbor Terry Kinnison had a dispute over a $3,000 land deal. Kinnison lost the ensuing lawsuit and was ordered to pay Weaver an additional $2,100 in court costs and damages. Kinnison wrote letters to the Federal Bureau of Investigation (FBI), the Secret Service, and the county sheriff in which he alleged that Weaver had threatened to kill Pope John Paul II, President Ronald Reagan, and Idaho Governor John V. Evans.

In January 1985, the FBI and the Secret Service launched an investigation into allegations that Weaver had made threats against Reagan and other government and law enforcement officials. On February 12, Weaver and his wife were interviewed by two FBI agents, two Secret Service agents, and the Boundary County sheriff and his chief investigator. The Secret Service had been told that Weaver was a member of Aryan Nations (an antisemitic, Neo-Nazi, white supremacist terrorist organization) and that he had a large weapons cache at his residence. Weaver denied these allegations, and the government filed no charges. On three or four occasions, the Weavers had attended Aryan Nations meetings at Hayden Lake, where there was a compound for government resisters and white supremacists/separatists.

The investigation noted that Weaver associated with Frank Kumnick, who was known to associate with members of Aryan Nations. Weaver told the investigators that neither he nor Kumnick was a member of Aryan Nations but he stated that Kumnick was "associated with The Covenant, The Sword, and the Arm of the Lord." On February 28, Randy and Vicki Weaver filed an affidavit with the county courthouse alleging that their personal enemies were plotting to provoke the FBI into attacking and killing the Weaver family. On May 6, the Weavers sent President Reagan a letter claiming that their enemies might have sent Reagan a threatening letter under a forged signature. In 1992, the prosecutor cited the 1985 letter as an overt act of the Weaver family's conspiracy against the federal government.

=== ATF involvement ===
The Bureau of Alcohol, Tobacco and Firearms (ATF) first became aware of Weaver in July 1986, when he was introduced to a confidential ATF informant at a meeting at the World Aryan Congress. The informant portrayed himself as a weapons dealer working with motorcycle gangs. Weaver had been invited to the meeting by Kumnick, the original target of the ATF investigation. It was Weaver's first time at this Congress. Over the next three years, Weaver and the informant met several times. In July 1989, Weaver invited the informant to his home to discuss forming a group to fight the "Zionist Organized Government", referring to the U.S. government.

In October 1989, the ATF claimed that Weaver sold the informant two sawed-off shotguns, with the overall length of the guns shorter than the limit set by federal law. In November 1989, Weaver accused the ATF informant of being a spy for the police; Weaver later wrote he had been warned by "Rico V." The informant's handler, Herb Byerly, ordered him to have no further contact with Weaver. Eventually, FBI informant Rico Valentino outed the ATF informant to Aryan Nations security.

In June 1990, Byerly attempted to use the sawed-off shotgun charge as leverage to get Weaver to act as an informant for his investigation into Aryan Nations. Weaver refused to become a "snitch", and the ATF filed the gun charges in June 1990. The ATF alleged that Weaver was a bank robber with criminal convictions. A federal grand jury indicted Weaver in December 1990 for making and possessing, but not for selling, illegal weapons in October 1989.

The ATF concluded it would be too dangerous for agents to arrest Weaver at his property. In January 1991, ATF agents posed as broken-down motorists and arrested Weaver when he and Vicki stopped to assist. Weaver was told of the charges against him, released on bail, and told that his trial would begin on February 19, 1991. On January 22, the judge in the case appointed attorney Everett Hofmeister as Weaver's legal representative. The same day, Weaver called probation officer Karl Richins and told him that he had been instructed to contact Richins on that date. Richins did not have the case file at that time, so he asked Weaver to leave his contact information and said he would contact him when he received the paperwork. According to Richins, Weaver did not give him a telephone number. Hofmeister sent Weaver letters on January 19, January 31, and February 5, asking Weaver to contact him to work on his defense within the federal court system.

On February 5, the trial date was changed from February 19 to 20 to give participants more travel time following a federal holiday. The court clerk sent the parties a letter informing them of the date change, but the notice was not sent directly to Weaver, only to Hofmeister. On February 7, Richins sent Weaver a letter indicating that he had the case file and needed to talk with Weaver. This letter erroneously stated that Weaver's trial date was March 20. On February 8, Hofmeister again attempted to contact Weaver by letter informing him that the trial was to begin on February 20 and that Weaver needed to contact him immediately. Hofmeister also made several calls to individuals who knew Weaver, asking them to call him. Hofmeister told U.S. District Court Judge Harold L. Ryan that he had been unable to reach Weaver before the scheduled court date.

When Weaver did not appear in court on February 20, Ryan issued a bench warrant for failure to appear in court. On February 26, Ken Keller, a reporter for the Kootenai Valley Times, telephoned the U.S. Probation Office and asked whether Weaver did not show in court on February 20 because the letter Richins sent him had an incorrect date. Upon finding a copy of the letter, the Chief Probation Officer, Terrence Hummel, contacted Ryan's clerk and informed them of the incorrect date in the correspondence. Hummel also contacted the U.S. Marshals Service (USMS) and Weaver's attorney, informing them both of the scheduling error. Judge Ryan, however, refused to withdraw the bench warrant.

The USMS agreed to put off executing the warrant until after March 20 in order to see whether Weaver would show up in court on that day. If he were to show up on March 20, the Department of Justice claimed that all indications are that the warrant would have been dropped. But instead, the U.S. Attorney's Office (USAO) called a grand jury on March 14. The USAO did not inform the grand jury of Richins's letter and the grand jury issued an indictment for failure to appear.

=== U.S. Marshals Service involvement ===
When the Weaver case passed from the ATF to the USMS, no one informed the marshals that the ATF had attempted to solicit Weaver as an informant.

As the law enforcement arm of the federal courts, the USMS were responsible for arresting and bringing in Weaver, now considered a fugitive. Weaver simply stayed in his remote home, stating he would resist any attempt to take him by force.

Weaver was known to have an intense distrust of government. The erroneous Richins letter compounded this sentiment and may have contributed to Weaver's reluctance to appear for trial. He was suspicious of what he thought were inconsistent messages from the government and his lawyer; he began to think there was a conspiracy against him. Weaver came to believe that he would not receive a fair trial if he were to appear in court. His distrust grew even further when Hofmeister erroneously told him that if he lost the trial, he would lose his land, essentially leaving Vicki homeless, and that the government would take away his children.

USMS officers made a series of attempts to have Weaver surrender peacefully, but he refused to leave his cabin. Weaver negotiated with U.S. Marshals Ron Evans, W. Warren Mays, and David Hunt through third parties from March 5 to October 12, 1991, when Assistant U.S. Attorney Ron Howen directed that the negotiations cease. The U.S. Attorney directed that all negotiations go through Hofmeister, but Weaver refused to talk with him. Marshals began preparing plans to capture Weaver to stand trial on the weapons charges and his failure to appear at the correct trial date.

Although marshals stopped the negotiations as ordered, they made other contact. On March 4, 1992, U.S. Marshals Ron Evans and Jack Cluff drove to the Weaver property and spoke with Weaver, posing as real-estate prospects. At a March 27, 1992, meeting at USMS headquarters, Art Roderick code-named the operation "Northern Exposure". Surveillance teams were dispatched and cameras set up to record activity at Weaver's residence. Marshals observed that Weaver and his family responded to vehicles and other visitors by taking up armed positions around the cabin until the visitors were recognized.

=== Threat source profile ===
Beginning in February 1991, the USMS developed a Threat Source Profile on Weaver. Agents' failure to integrate new information into that profile was criticized in a 1995 report by a subcommittee of the Senate Judiciary Committee:

The Subcommittee is ... concerned that, as Marshals investigating the Weaver case learned facts that contradicted information they previously had been provided, they did not adequately integrate their updated knowledge into their overall assessment of who Randy Weaver was or what threat he might pose. If the Marshals made any attempt to assess the credibility of the various people who gave them information about Weaver, they never recorded their assessments. Thus, rather than maintaining the Threat Source Profile as a living document, the Marshals added new reports to an ever-expanding file, and their overall assessment never really changed. These problems rendered it difficult for other law enforcement officials to assess the Weaver case accurately without the benefit of first-hand briefings from persons who had continuing involvement with him.

Many of the people the USMS used as third party go-betweens on the Weaver case—Bill and Judy Grider, Alan Jeppeson, and Richard Butler—were assessed by the Marshals as more radical than the Weavers. When Deputy U.S. Marshal (DUSM) Dave Hunt asked Grider, "Why shouldn't I just go up there ... and talk to him?", Grider replied, "Let me put it to you this way. If I was sitting on my property and somebody with a gun comes to do me harm, then I'll probably shoot him."

The Subcommittee said that the profile included "a brief psychological profile completed by a person who had conducted no firsthand interviews and was so unfamiliar with the case that he referred to Weaver as 'Mr. Randall' throughout". A later memo circulated within the Justice Department opined that:

The assumptions of federal and some state and local law enforcement personnel about Weaver—that he was a Green Beret, that he would shoot on sight anyone who attempted to arrest him, that he had collected certain types of arms, that he had "booby-trapped" and tunneled his property—exaggerated the threat he posed.

A review of Weaver's DD-214 in an investigation after the events of Ruby Ridge revealed that Weaver had never been a Green Beret or a member of the Special Forces; it was possible he had received some general demolition training as a combat engineer.

=== Rivera helicopter incident ===
Following a flyover by a hired helicopter for Geraldo Rivera's Now It Can Be Told television show on April 18, 1992, the USMS received news reports that Weaver had shot at the helicopter. That day in Idaho, U.S. Marshals were installing surveillance cameras overlooking the Weaver property. In a field report dated April 18, 1992, Marshal W. Warren Mays noted the sighting of a helicopter near the Weaver property but did not report hearing any gunfire. In an interview with a Coeur D'Alene newspaper, Weaver denied that anyone had fired at the helicopter. When interviewed by the FBI, co-pilot Richard Weiss said that Weaver had not fired on his helicopter. (Note: The other pilot, Jim Gerlach, had indicated to reporters that the helicopter was fired on.) The Ruby Ridge Task Force report said that when the "indictment [of Weaver] was presented to the grand jury, the prosecution had evidence that no shots had been fired at the helicopter."

Media reports that Weaver had fired on the Rivera helicopter became part of the justification later cited by U.S. Marshal Wayne "Duke" Smith and FBI HRT Commander Richard Rogers in drawing up the Ruby Ridge rules of engagement on August 21–22, 1992. Also, in spite of Weiss's repeated denials that shots had been fired at his helicopter, Howen charged that, as Overt Act 32 of the Weavers' Conspiracy Against the Federal Government, Randy, Vicki, and Harris fired two shots at the Rivera helicopter.

Operation "Northern Exposure" was suspended for three months due to the confirmation hearings for United States Marshals Service Director Henry E. Hudson.

== August 21 firefight ==
On August 21, 1992, six U.S. Marshals were sent to scout the area to determine suitable places away from the cabin to apprehend and arrest Weaver. The marshals, dressed in military camouflage, were equipped with night-vision goggles and M16 rifles. Marshals Art Roderick, Larry Cooper, and William F. "Bill" Degan formed the reconnaissance team, while Marshals David Hunt, Joseph Thomas, and Frank Norris formed an observation post (OP) team on the ridge north of the cabin.

While scouting the area, Roderick threw two rocks at the Weaver cabin to test the reaction of the family's dog, a yellow Labrador Retriever named Striker. Striker ran out to pursue the source of the sound. Weaver—in addition to his friend, Kevin Harris, and Weaver's 14-year-old son, Samuel ("Sammy")—followed Striker to investigate, hoping the dog had found a game animal, as the cabin was out of meat. The recon team (Roderick, Cooper, and Degan) initially retreated through the woods, but later took up hidden defensive positions.

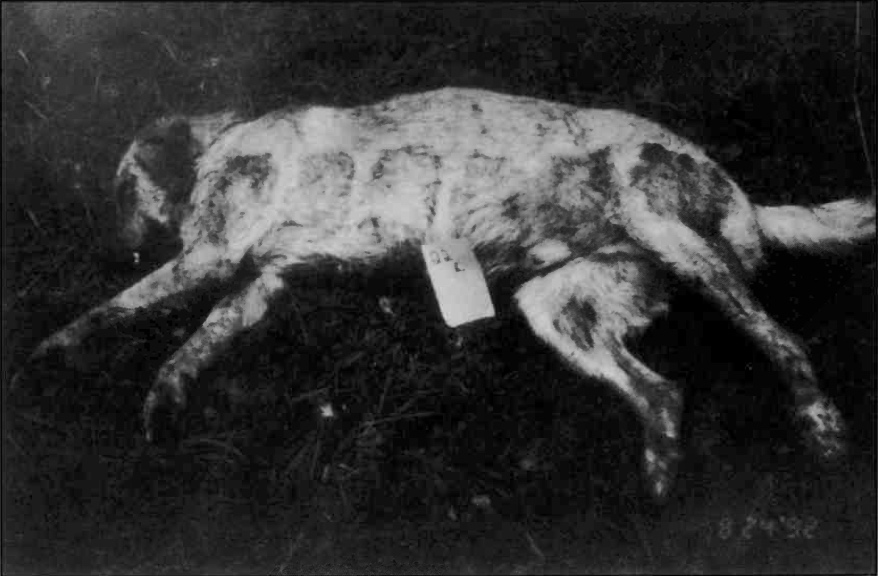
The body of Striker after he was shot and killed by Marshal Art Roderick

The dog was drawn to the area where the recon team was hiding because a neighbor started a loud pickup truck. Samuel and Harris followed the dog through the woods, while Randy took a separate logging trail; Vicki, Sara, Rachel, and baby Elisheba remained at the cabin. Near the trail, Randy encountered the recon team, who later claimed they announced themselves to him at that time. Roderick said he yelled, "Back off! U.S. Marshal!" upon sighting Weaver, while Cooper said he shouted, "Stop! U.S. Marshal!"

A minute later, Samuel and Harris emerged from the woods following the dog, who had brought them directly to the recon team. Roderick shot and killed the dog. Seeing this, Samuel yelled, "You've killed my dog, you son of a bitch!" and then shot in the direction of Roderick. Cooper then shot towards Samuel and Harris, who both sought cover. Harris, upon finding cover behind a tree stump, returned fire with a shot that killed Deputy U.S. Marshall William "Bill" Degan Jr. Samuel, while retreating and running up a hill, was shot in the back and killed by Cooper.

A later ballistics report showed that a total of nineteen rounds were fired during the fight. Roderick fired one shot from an M16A1 (which killed the dog by entering near his rear and exiting through his chest), then Samuel fired three shots from a .223 Ruger Mini-14 (at Roderick), Degan fired seven shots from an M16 (at Harris and Weaver, while moving at least 21 feet (6.4 m)), Cooper fired six shots from a 9 mm Colt submachine gun (at Harris and Weaver), then Harris fired two shots from a .30-06 M1917 Enfield Rifle (striking and killing Degan).

The origin of the shot that killed Samuel was of critical concern in all investigations. The Senate Subcommittee on Terrorism, Technology and Government Information, chaired by Senator Arlen Specter, investigated the matter and engaged experts, noting that the government's position at trial was that Cooper had fired the fatal shot. However, in a 1996 Senate Report, the Subcommittee ultimately declined to reach a final conclusion on that question. A report by the Justice Department's Ruby Ridge Task Force (RRTF) to the Office of Professional Responsibility (OPR, 1994) stated:

The evidence suggests, but does not establish, that the shot that killed Samuel Weaver was fired by DUSM Cooper.

It was concluded there was no indication he intended to kill or injure Samuel. Reporter Jess Walter, in his work Ruby Ridge: The Truth and Tragedy of the Randy Weaver Family, concludes that Cooper fired the bullet that killed Samuel Weaver. The County Sheriff later conducted an independent search of the area and discovered a bullet that both matched Cooper's 9 mm Colt submachine gun and contained fibers that matched Samuel's shirt, conclusively proving Cooper shot Samuel.

Harris's and the federal agents' accounts differ as to who fired the first shot that day. In Harris's 1993 trial for charges related to Degan's death, prosecutors alleged that Harris fired the first shot. Harris asserted that he fired in self-defense. He was acquitted by a jury. At trial, ballistics experts called by the prosecution testified that the physical evidence could not conclusively prove either the prosecution or the defense's theories about the gunfight. Martin Fackler testified that Roderick fired the shot that killed the dog, Degan fired a shot that hit Samuel in the right elbow, Harris shot and killed Degan, and Cooper "probably" shot and killed Samuel.

Roderick and Cooper both testified that the dog emerged from the woods ahead of Harris and Samuel. According to their account, Degan confronted Harris, who then turned and fatally shot Degan before Degan could fire. Roderick claimed he shot the dog once, after which Samuel fired twice at him, prompting Roderick to return fire. Both Roderick and Cooper testified that they heard multiple gunshots from the Weaver party. Cooper further testified that he fired two three-shot bursts at Harris, causing Harris to fall "like a sack of potatoes," with leaves flying up in front of him, likely from the impact of a round. After taking cover, Cooper stated that he saw Samuel flee, then Cooper radioed fellow marshal Dave Hunt to report that he had either wounded or killed Harris.

As described by Randy and Sara Weaver in their book, The Federal Siege (1998), Harris's version of events differed, as follows. Harris told the Weavers that he and Samuel followed the dog out of the woods, and the dog ran up to Cooper and Roderick, who shot the dog in front of them. Samuel yelled, "You shot my dog, you son of a bitch!" and fired a shot at Roderick. Harris said that Degan came out of the woods and shot Samuel in the arm. In response, Harris fired at Degan and hit him in the chest. Cooper began firing at Harris, who ducked for cover, then Cooper fired again, hitting Samuel in the back, who crumpled. Harris fired at Cooper from only 6 feet (2 m) away, forcing Cooper to take cover. Only then did he hear Cooper identify himself as a U.S. Marshal.

Harris said he checked Samuel and found him dead, then ran to the Weavers' cabin. Samuel's parents, Randy and Vicki, retrieved their son's body and brought it to their guest cabin.

Meanwhile, Marshals Norris, Cooper, and Roderick stayed with Degan's body. Marshals Hunt and Thomas went to a neighbor's house to call for assistance from the Marshall Service's Crisis Center in Washington, D.C.. Hunt reported to the Crisis Center that no further gunfire had been heard after 11:15 a.m.

== Siege and controversy ==
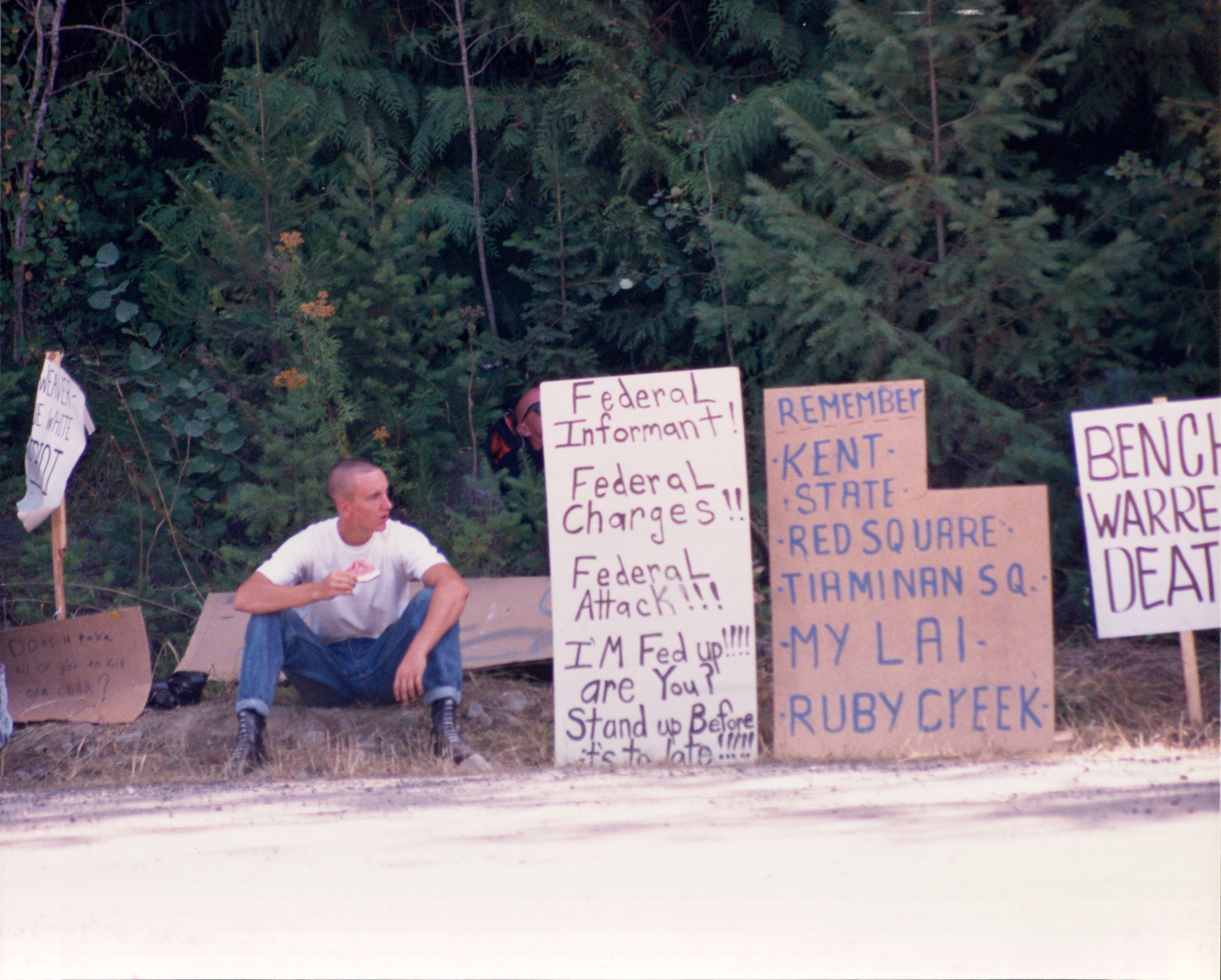
Protestors supporting the Weavers

In the aftermath of the gunfight on the morning of August 21, Deputy Marshal Hunt requested immediate support from Idaho law enforcement and alerted federal agencies that a U.S. Marshal had been killed. The Marshals Service Crisis Center was activated, and the Marshals Service Special Operations Group (SOG) was ordered to deploy. The Boundary County sheriff's office mobilized. Also in response to the USMS request, Idaho Governor Cecil Andrus declared a state of emergency in Boundary County, allowing use of the Idaho National Guard Armory at Bonners Ferry and, after an initial delay, to use National Guard armored personnel carriers (APCs). Soon thereafter, the Idaho State Police arrived at the scene.

FBI Headquarters in Washington, DC, responded by sending the Hostage Rescue Team (HRT) from Quantico to Idaho. Special Agent in Charge (SAC) Eugene Glenn of the Salt Lake City FBI office was appointed Site Commander with responsibility for all active individuals from the FBI, ATF, and USMS. A stand-off ensued for eleven days, as several hundred federal agents surrounded the house, and negotiations for a surrender were attempted.

=== Rules of engagement allowing deadly force ===
By Saturday, August 22, special rules of engagement (ROE) were drafted and approved by FBI Headquarters and the Marshal Service for use on Ruby Ridge. According to the later RRTF report to the DOJ (1994), the Ruby Ridge ROE were as follows:

1. "If any adult in the area around the cabin is observed with a weapon after the surrender announcement had been made, deadly force could and should be used to neutralize the individual."
2. "If any adult male is observed with a weapon prior to the announcement deadly force can and should be employed if the shot could be taken without endangering any children."
3. "If compromised by any dog the dog can be taken out."
4. "Any subjects other than Randy Weaver, Vicki Weaver, Kevin Harris presenting threat of death or grievous bodily harm FBI rules of deadly force apply. Deadly force can be utilized to prevent the death or grievous bodily injury to oneself or that of another."

(From the sworn statement of FBI SAC Eugene Glenn).

As noted in a footnote to the report in this crucial section:

The [ROE] was modified from "adult" to "adult male" [in ROE point 2] to exclude Vicki Weaver around 2:30 or 3:00 p.m. after consultation with [SAC Eugene] Glenn because Vicki Weaver was not seen at the site of Degan's slaying.

The ROE were communicated to agents on site, including communication to HRT sniper/observers prior to deployment, communications that included the change of "adult" to "adult male" to exclude Vicki Weaver. Some deployed FBI agents, in particular the sniper/observers, would later describe they adopted ROE as a "green light" to "shoot on sight".

On Wednesday, August 26, four days after Vicki was killed, the ROE that had been in effect since the arrival of the HRT were revoked. Per Glenn's direction, the FBI's Standard Deadly Force Policy replaced the ROE to guide the law enforcement personnel that were to be deployed to the cabin perimeter. The FBI rules of deadly force in effect in 1992 stated that:

Agents are not to use deadly force against any person except as necessary in self-defense or the defense of another, when they have reason to believe that they or another are in danger of death or grievous bodily harm. Whenever feasible, verbal warnings should be given before deadly force is applied.

This was in stark contrast to the permissive ROE adopted for the Ruby Ridge stand-off.

=== Reactions to "green light" for use of deadly force ===
On August 22, the second day of the siege, between 2:30 and 3:30 pm, the FBI HRT sniper/observer teams were briefed and deployed to the cabin on foot.

According to the RRTF report to the DOJ, there were various views and interpretations taken of these ROEs by members of FBI SWAT teams in action at the Ruby Ridge site. Denver SWAT team leader Gregory Sexton described them as "severe" and "inappropriate." Two members of the Denver SWAT team said they were "strong" and a "departure from the ... standard deadly force policy", "inappropriate", and of a sort one "had never been given" before. The latter of these two members said that "other SWAT team members were taken aback by the Rules and that most of them clung to the FBI's standard deadly force policy." Another team member responded to the briefing on the ROE with "[y]ou've gotta be kidding."

However, most of the FBI HRT sniper/observers accepted the ROE as modifying the deadly force policy. According to later interviews, HRT sniper Dale Monroe saw the ROE as a "green light" to shoot armed adult males on sight, and HRT sniper Edward Wenger believed that if he observed armed adults, he could use deadly force, but he was to follow standard deadly force policy for all other individuals. Fred Lanceley, the FBI Hostage Negotiator at Ruby Ridge, was "surprised and shocked" at the ROE, the most severe rules he had heard in more than 300 hostage situations. He later characterized the ROE as being inconsistent with standard policy. The 1996 Senate report criticized the ROE as "virtual shoot-on-sight orders."

=== August 22 sniper shots: the death of Vicki Weaver and wounding of Randy Weaver ===
Before the negotiators arrived at the cabin, FBI sniper Lon Horiuchi, from a position over 200 yards (180 m) north and above the Weaver cabin, shot and wounded Randy Weaver in the back with the bullet exiting his right armpit, while he was lifting the latch on the shed to visit the body of his dead son. (The sniper testified at the later trial that he had put his crosshairs on Weaver's spine, but Weaver moved at the last second.) As Weaver, his 16-year-old daughter Sara, and Harris ran back toward the cabin, Horiuchi fired a second bullet, wounding Harris in the chest. This bullet killed Vicki Weaver, who was standing behind the door of the cabin when Harris entered. Vicki was holding the Weavers' 10-month-old baby Elisheba.

=== Constitutionality of second shot after threat had been neutralized ===
The RRTF report to the DOJ's Office of Professional Responsibility (OPR) of June 1994 stated unequivocally in conclusion (in its executive summary) that the rules that allowed the second shot to have been made did not satisfy constitutional standards for legal use of deadly force. The 1996 report of the U.S. Senate Judiciary Committee's Subcommittee on Terrorism, Technology and Government Information, Arlen Specter [R-PA], chair, concurred, with Senator Dianne Feinstein [D-CA] dissenting. The DOJ's RRTF report said that the lack of a request for surrender before Agent Horiuchi's second shot was "inexcusable", as Harris and the Weavers were running for cover at the time and did not pose an imminent threat.

The later Justice task force criticized Horiuchi for firing through the door, when he did not know if anyone was on the other side of it. While there is a dispute as to who approved the rules of engagement which Horiuchi followed, the task force condemned the rules of engagement that allowed shots to be fired without a request for surrender.

=== Situational reevaluation, ROE is suspended, the siege ends ===
The FBI's HQ and the Site Commanders in Idaho both re-evaluated the situation based on information about what had happened on August 21 which they were receiving from U.S. Marshals Hunt, Cooper and Roderick. On August 23, repeated attempts to negotiate with Weaver via a bullhorn failed; there was no response from the cabin.

On about Monday, August 24, the fourth day of the siege, FBI Deputy Assistant Director Danny Coulson, who did not know that Vicki Weaver had been killed, wrote a memo about the Weavers' legal position. The memo is recorded in the 1996 report (although it is unclear whether the Senate Subcommittee or Coulson himself censored the word "shit"):

Something to Consider

1. Charge against Weaver is Bull S___.
2. No one saw Weaver do any shooting.
3. Vicki has no charges against her.
4. Weaver's defense. He ran down the hill to see what dog was barking at. Some guys in camys [camouflage] shot his dog. Started shooting at him. Killed his son. Harris did the shooting. He is in pretty strong legal position.

The stand-off was ultimately resolved by civilian negotiators including Bo Gritz, to whom Weaver agreed to speak. The wounded Harris, who had earlier urged Weaver for a mercy killing, was convinced by Gritz's mediation to surrender on Sunday, August 30. Harris was removed from the property via stretcher and was then flown by a medical evacuation helicopter (a Bell UH-1N belonging to the U.S. Air Force) to Sacred Heart Medical Center in Spokane. Weaver allowed the removal of his wife's body, which Gritz oversaw.

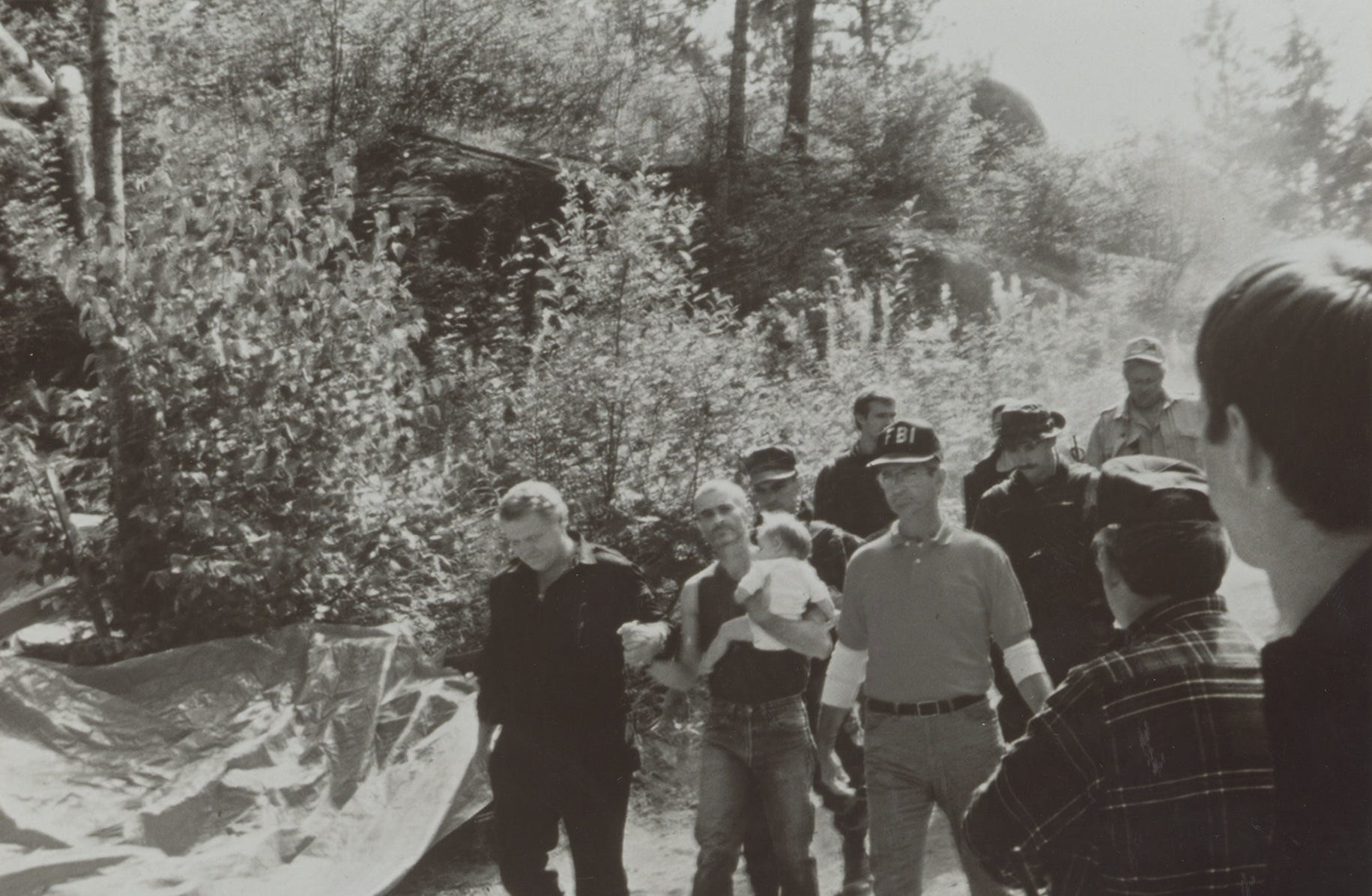
Bo Gritz and FBI agents escort Randy Weaver down the mountain on August 31, 1992

The FBI HRT Commander gave Gritz a deadline to get the remaining Weavers to surrender, and if they did not surrender on the day of the deadline, he said he would resolve the standoff by launching a tactical assault. Weaver and his daughters surrendered the next day; both Harris and Weaver were arrested. Harris was in serious condition at Sacred Heart, but U.S. Marshals did not allow his parents to see him (or talk by telephone) until Monday evening, after a federal court order was issued. Weaver's daughters were released to the custody of relatives. Federal officials considered charging Sara, who was 16, as an adult.

Weaver was transferred by military helicopter to the airport at Sandpoint and from there he was flown by USMS jet to Boise. There he was given a brief medical examination at St. Luke's Medical Center. He was held at the Ada County jail and arraigned in federal court the following day, Tuesday, September 1.

== Trials of Weaver and Harris ==
Weaver and Harris were charged with multiple offenses. Their trial in U.S. District Court in Boise began in April 1993, presided over by Judge Edward Lodge. In mid-June, Weaver's defense attorney, Gerry Spence, rested his case without calling any witnesses for the defense. Instead, he sought to convince the jury through cross-examination aimed at discrediting the government's evidence and witnesses. In July, Weaver was acquitted of all of the charges except the charge he incurred by missing his original court date and the charge of violating his bail conditions, for which he was sentenced to 18 months imprisonment and fined $10,000 in October. Credited with time served and good behavior, Weaver served less than 16 months and he was released from the Canyon County jail in Caldwell in mid-December. Spence later wrote that he rejected Weaver's extremist political opinions, but took the case because he believed Federal officials had entrapped Weaver and also behaved unconscionably in shooting Weaver's unarmed wife.

Harris was defended by attorney David Nevin and he was acquitted of all charges. Exactly five years after the incident (August 21, 1997), he was indicted for the first-degree murder of DUSM Bill Degan by Boundary County prosecutor Denise Woodbury, but the charge was dismissed in early October on grounds of double jeopardy, because he had been acquitted of that same charge in the federal criminal trial in 1993.

== Federal investigations of law enforcement ==
Defense counsels for Weaver and Harris alleged throughout their 1993 trial that agents of the ATF, USMS, and FBI were themselves guilty of serious wrongdoing. The Department of Justice (DOJ) created the Ruby Ridge Task Force (RRTF) to investigate events. It delivered a 542-page report on June 10, 1994, to the DOJ Office of Professional Responsibility (OPR). (This RRTF report, originally available in a highly redacted form, later became available in a much more complete form.)

Questions persisted about Ruby Ridge and the subsequent Waco siege, which involved the same agencies and many of the same officials. The Senate Subcommittee on Terrorism, Technology and Government Information held fourteen days of hearings on these incidents and allegations of misconduct, ending on October 19, 1995. The hearings were televised on C-SPAN. The internal 1994 Ruby Ridge Task Force Report and the public 1995 Senate subcommittee report on Ruby Ridge both criticized the rules of engagement by claiming that they were unconstitutional.

A 1995 GAO investigation was conducted on the policies regarding use of force by federal law enforcement agencies. Its report said: "In October 1995, Treasury and Justice adopted use of deadly force policies to standardize the various policies their component agencies had adopted over the years." The major change was that agencies required a law enforcement agent to have reasonable belief of an "imminent" danger of death or serious physical injury in order to use deadly force. This brought all federal LEA deadly force policies in line with the U.S. Supreme Court rulings Tennessee v. Garner, 471 U.S. 1, 18 (1985) and Graham v. Connor, 490 U.S. 386 (1989), which applied to state and local law enforcement agencies.

In 1997, Michael Kahoe, the chief of the FBI's violent crimes section, pled guilty to obstruction of justice for destroying a report which was critical of the agency's role at Ruby Ridge. He was sentenced to 18 months and a $4,000 fine.

== Civil suits ==
Randy Weaver and his daughters filed a wrongful death suit for $200 million which was related to the killing of his wife and son. In an out-of-court settlement in August 1995, the federal government awarded Randy Weaver $100,000 and it also awarded $1 million to each of his three daughters. The government did not admit that it had committed any wrongdoing in relation to the deaths of Samuel and Vicki. On the condition of anonymity, a DOJ official told The Washington Post that he believed that the Weavers would have probably won the full amount if the case had gone to trial.

The attorney for Harris pressed Harris's civil suit for damages, but federal officials vowed that they would never pay someone who had killed a U.S. Marshal. In September 2000, Harris was awarded a $380,000 settlement by the government.

== Criminal charges ==
In 1997, Boundary County prosecutor Denise Woodbury indicted FBI HRT sniper Lon Horiuchi for manslaughter on state charges, just before the statute of limitations expired. She appointed a special prosecutor to conduct the case. However, in 1998 the trial was removed to federal court because Horiuchi had been acting in the line of duty as a federal law enforcement officer. Judge Lodge quickly dismissed the case on grounds of sovereign immunity.

The decision to dismiss charges was reversed (6–5) in 2001 by an en banc panel of the Ninth Circuit, which held that enough uncertainty about the facts of the case existed for Horiuchi to stand trial on state manslaughter charges. Boundary County prosecutor Brett Benson, who had defeated Woodbury in the May 2000 primary and won the November election, decided to drop the case. He said he believed that it was unlikely the state could prove the criminal charges, and too much time had passed. He also believed his decision would enable the process of healing in the county. Attorney Stephen Yagman, who had been appointed as the special prosecutor, said that he vehemently disagreed with the decision. He suggested that the case could still be prosecuted if the Boundary County prosecutor later changed again.

== Later life of the Weavers ==
Randy Weaver and his daughter Sara wrote The Federal Siege at Ruby Ridge (1998), about the incident, which was published in paperback.

The Weaver family, including Randy, later moved to Kalispell, Montana. Sara and the other two Weaver daughters are employed there. In 2012, after she became a born again Christian, Sara Weaver said that she forgives the federal agents who killed her mother and brother.

Randy Weaver died on May 11, 2022, at the age of 74. A cause of death was not given.

== In popular culture ==
A CBS miniseries about the Ruby Ridge incident, titled Ruby Ridge: An American Tragedy, aired on May 19 and 21, 1996. It was based on the book Every Knee Shall Bow by reporter Jess Walter. It starred Laura Dern as Vicki, Kirsten Dunst as Sara, and Randy Quaid as Randy. Later that year the television series was adapted as a full-length TV movie, The Siege at Ruby Ridge.

In 1999, bluegrass musician Peter Rowan addressed the events at Ruby Ridge in his song "The Ballad of Ruby Ridge".

In April 2003, Discovery Times Channel (now Discovery Channel) released Ruby Ridge: Anatomy of a Tragedy, a 44 minute television documentary of the standoff. The episode featured extensive interviews with both Randy and Rachel Weaver, along with former FBI agents at the site, and Bo Gritz, who helped end the Ruby Ridge standoff.

Ruby Ridge was the subject of Criminal Minds, Season Three, episode 7, "Identity" (2007). Agent David Rossi says that he was at Ruby Ridge during the siege.

In 2017, it was the focus of the 323rd episode of American Experience, the 5th episode of its 29th season.

A heavily fictionalized version of the standoff, including the shooting of Vicki Weaver, is featured in the first episode of the Paramount Network television miniseries Waco (2018).

Tara Westover, in her memoir Educated (2018), referred to this incident, noting her own family's preparations to defend their isolated home against a potential siege by "the Feds".

The Ruby Ridge incident was the subject of the first season of the narrative podcast series Slate Presents. The four-episode season, titled Standoff: What Happened at Ruby Ridge? ran as a stand-alone miniseries hosted by journalist Ruth Graham.

In 2020, the incident was featured in a season of Fox Nation's Scandalous.

In 2023, the incident was referenced in an episode of The Righteous Gemstones, season three, episode two, "But Esau Ran to Meet Him".

== See also ==
- 1985 MOVE bombing – 1985 aerial bombing by police in Philadelphia
- 1992 Los Angeles riots – Riots and protests following the beating of Rodney King
- 2003 standoff in Abbeville, South Carolina – 14-hour standoff and shootout
- American militia movement – Political movement of paramilitary groups in the US
- Branch Davidians – American religious sect
- Bundy standoff – 2014 armed confrontation in Nevada, US
- Christian Identity – White supremacist interpretation of Christianity
- Christian Patriot movement – American Christian political movement
- Critical Incident Response Group (CIRG) – US FBI special crisis unit
- Leonard Peltier – Native American activist (born 1944)
- List of ATF Controversies
- List of killings by law enforcement officers in the United States
- Michigan Militia – Anti-government paramilitary organization
- Militia of Montana – American paramilitary organization
- Montana Freemen – Anti-government Christian Patriot militia
- Posse Comitatus (organization) – Extremist American anti-government movement
- Rainbow Farm – Pro-marijuana commune in Michigan (1996–2001)
- Sagebrush Rebellion – Political movement for local control of U.S. government land
- Shannon Street massacre – 1983 shootout between police and religious leaders in Memphis, Tennessee, U.S.
- Singer–Swapp standoff – Standoff in Utah, 1988

== Bibliography ==
=== Primary sources ===
- Ruby Ridge Task Force (June 10, 1994). Report of the Ruby Ridge Task Force to the Office of Professional Responsibility [OPR] of Investigation of Allegations of Improper Governmental Conduct in the Investigation, Apprehension and Prosecution of Randall C. Weaver and Kevin L. Harris [most complete version] (Report). Washington, DC: U.S. Department of Justice.

Chapters and sections cited from this work include:
- I. Introduction / Executive Summary

- §B. Significant Findings.

- IV. Specific Issues Investigated

- §B. The Failure of Weaver to Appear for Trial (2. Statement of Facts, subsection c.; or passim);
- §C. Efforts by the Marshals Service to Effect the Arrest of Weaver (2. Statement of Facts, subsections a., g.);
- §D. Marshals Service Activities Between August 17 and 21, 1992 (2. Statement of Facts, subsection c.; 3. Discussion, subsections a., c.; 4. Conclusion; or passim)
- §F. FBI's Rules of Engagement and Operations on August 21 and 22, 1992 (2. Statement of Facts, subsections a.-g.; 3. Discussion, subsection a; or passim);
- §H. Law Enforcement Operations at Ruby Ridge From August 22, 1992 Until August 31, 1992 (2. Statement of Facts, subsection b.); and
- §L. Scope of the Indictment and Alleged Prosecutorial Misconduct Before the Grand Jury (passim).

- VI. Chronology of Events (passim).
Note, other nearly identical sources of the same content are available online, e.g., differing only in terms of header or introductory content.

- Ridge Task Force (November 9, 2006 rel.) [June 10, 1994].Report of the Ruby Ridge Task Force to the Office of Professional Responsibility [OPR] of Investigation of Allegations of Improper Governmental Conduct in the Investigation, Apprehension and Prosecution of Randall C. Weaver and Kevin L. Harris [OPR legacy, highly redacted version]. Washington, DC: U.S. Department of Justice.

This source exists as a series of PDF files of the full but heavily redacted report, including cover page-p. 39, pp. 40–84, pp. 85–125, pp. 126–165, pp. 166–211, pp. 212–251, pp. 252–298, pp. 299–338, pp. 339–395, pp. 396–474, pp. 475–516, and pp. 517–545, all via Justice.gov, all. Retrieved February 8, 2017.

- U.S. Senate Subcommittee on Terrorism Technology and Government [Arlen Specter, Chair] (1996). Ruby Ridge: Report of the Subcommittee on Terrorism, Technology and Government, Information of the Senate Committee on the Judiciary (Report). Washington, DC: U.S. Senate. pp. 154 pages. Reproduced in published book form by Diane Publishing, Collingdale, PA, ISBN 978-0788129766.

Chapters and sections cited from this work include:
- Introduction
- B. United States Marshal Service

- § 5. August 21, 1992 Firefight (subsections a.–c.)

- D. Federal Bureau of Investigation

- § 4. Two Shots Taken by Sniper/Observer on August 22, 1992 (subsection c.)

- Weaver, Randy; Weaver, Sara (1998). The Federal Siege at Ruby Ridge: In Our Own Words. Ruby Ridge, ID: Ruby Ridge Inc. ISBN 0966433408.

=== Secondary sources ===
- Walter, Jess (2002) [1995]. Ruby Ridge: The Truth and Tragedy of the Randy Weaver Family. New York: Regan Books/HarperCollins. ISBN 006000794X.

== Further reading and viewing ==
=== Further sources ===
- Morganthau, Tom; Isikoff, Michael; Cohn, Bob (August 28, 1995). "The Echoes of Ruby Ridge". Newsweek: 25–28.
- Witkin, Gordon (September 11, 1995). "The Nightmare of Idaho's Ruby Ridge". U.S. News & World Report. 119 (10): 24. Archived from the original (print and online news) on August 6, 2020.
- Spence, Gerry (1996). From Freedom To Slavery: The Rebirth of Tyranny in America. St. Martin's/Griffin. ISBN 978-0312143428.
- Coulson, Danny O.; Shannon, Elaine (2001) [1999]. No Heroes: Inside the FBI's Secret Counter-Terror Force. New York: Simon and Schuster/Pocket Books. pp. 398–403, 410, 444, 465–477, 490, 561–564, 580, 590. ISBN 978-0671020620..

=== Other books ===
- Brown, Tony D.; Brown, Jackie J. (2000). The First Canary: The Inside Story of Ruby Ridge and A Decade Of Cover Up. Big Pine Publishing Company. ISBN 0971024804.
- Whitcomb, Christopher (2001). Cold Zero: Inside the FBI Hostage Rescue Team. Corgi Books. ISBN 0552147885.
- Kessler, Ronald (2002). The Bureau: The Secret History of the FBI. Macmillan. ISBN 0312989776.
- Ronson, Jon (2002). Them: Adventures with Extremists. Simon & Schuster. ISBN 0743233212.

=== Other reports ===
- Anon. (1999). Project Megiddo (PDF) (Report). Washington, DC: U.S. Department of Justice, Federal Bureau of Investigation. p. 21. "[Quote:] The attached analysis, entitled PROJECT MEGIDDO, is an FBI strategic assessment of the potential for domestic terrorism in the United States undertaken in anticipation of or response to the arrival of the new millennium."^{[primary source]} Note, the author and date of publication do not appear on the title page or mast head of the document, but are inferred from other sources.

=== Other articles ===
- Moore, Martha T. (May 11, 2005). "1985 Bombing in Philadelphia Still Unsettled". USA Today. Relates Ruby Ridge to the 1985 MOVE bombing by the Philadelphia police, causing fire, the deaths of eleven occupants, and destruction of 65 houses in the West Philadelphia neighborhood. See also Sullivan, Laura (May 16, 2005). "Philadelphia MOVE Bombing Still Haunts Survivors". NPR.org. NPR.

=== Other documentaries ===
Randy Weaver and the Siege at Ruby Ridge have been the focus of numerous documentaries, including:

- "Ruby Ridge Investigation", by Nightline 1995, ABC News; ASIN B00005BK47
- Atrocities at Ruby Ridge: the Randy Weaver Story, Produced by KPOC-TV 1995; VHS tape distributed by The FOREND Times, Inc.
- "American Standoff," Retro Report / New York Times, October 26, 2014.
- A&E Network American Justice series, episode 047 – "Deadly Force": A look at controversial law enforcement policy. Features the police bombing of the MOVE headquarters in Philadelphia, which killed 11, and the shootings of Randy Weaver's wife and son at Ruby Ridge. Bill Kurtis hosts.
- PBS American Experience: "Ruby Ridge", episode S29E07, February 14, 2017. (This episode is also available on Netflix.)
- Season 1, Episode 1: "The Legend of Ruby Ridge" of the documentary series Secret Rulers of the World. – April 2001
