= Danny Coulson =

FBI executive (born 1941)

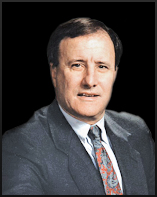
- Born: June 29, 1941 (age 85); Texas, U.S.
- Education: Bachelor's degree in Government, Texas Christian University Law degree, Southern Methodist University
- Occupation: Security consultant

Danny Coulson (born June 29, 1941) is a former Deputy Assistant Director of the FBI. In his thirty-year tenure at the FBI, Coulson created and commanded the FBI’s Hostage Rescue Team and commanded four field divisions.

As of Spring 2009, Danny Coulson is a successful security consultant, author, and guest speaker. His book No Heroes: Inside The FBI's Secret Counter-Terror Force was used as a dialogue reference for the 2008 Marvel Cinematic Universe debut film Iron Man, with the character of Agent Phil Coulson (portrayed by Clark Gregg) being named after him.

== History ==
Coulson grew up on military bases as his father was in the military. As a young man, he wanted to become a professional musician, but instead opted to pursue a legal education. He earned a bachelor's degree in Government from Texas Christian University. He then attended Southern Methodist University where he earned his Law Degree. He passed the Texas Bar. He originally aspired to join the Navy, but a former FBI agent he knew encouraged him to apply to work for the Bureau. His parents were not pleased with his decision to forego a career as an attorney and his mother disowned him.

Coulson’s first FBI assignment was undercover work in New Haven, Connecticut. He then worked for the next nine years in the FBI's New York Division, where he specialized in Police Assassination, Fugitive, and Bank Robbery Investigations. Additionally he served on the FBI's Sniper Team and commanded one of the most active SWAT Teams in the FBI.

In 1982, after a rise through the ranks of the FBI, Coulson was assigned to create the Hostage Rescue Team (HRT). While in command of HRT, Coulson personally negotiated the surrender of domestic terrorists at Mountain Home, AR, without any loss of life. For his actions, Coulson received the Attorney General's Award for Exceptional Service.

In 1984, Coulson led a team of FBI agents to Whidbey Island to arrest Robert Jay Mathews, the leader of the neo-Nazi terrorist group The Order. Mathews was killed in the resulting shootout.

In 1986 Coulson was the Inspector In Charge of the Iran Contra Investigation for the FBI and later headed up the same investigation for Independent Counsel Judge Lawrence Walsh.

In 1987, Coulson was the tactical commander at the Atlanta Prison Riots. That situation culminated with the release of over a hundred hostages. He has secured the release of over two hundred and seventy five hostages in his career.

As deputy assistant director of the FBI's Criminal Investigation Division, Coulson managed all investigations of violent crimes, and terrorism worldwide, as well as civil rights and special inquiries for the White House.

As Special Agent in Charge (SAC) of the FBI office in Dallas, Texas, he was detailed as one of the Commanders of the Oklahoma City bombing investigation.

In 1997, upon retiring from the FBI, Coulson created a private security firm, Coulson, Jackson and Associates, assisting law firms and international corporations. Additionally he handles security matters for some of the most high-profile athletes in the United States.

In 1999, Coulson admitted that the FBI had used pyrotechnic grenades at the Waco siege, contradicting previous reports.

While residing in Texas, Coulson co-authored No Heroes: Inside The FBI's Secret Counter-Terror Force with Elaine Shannon of Time, which was later used as a dialogue reference for the 2008 Marvel Cinematic Universe debut film Iron Man, with the character of Agent Phil Coulson (portrayed by Clark Gregg) being named after Coulson.
