= Tom Crosslin =

American activist

- Born: November 10, 1954; Elkhart, Indiana
- Died: September 3, 2001 (aged 46); Cass County, Michigan
- Cause of death: Shooting
- Known for: marijuana rights activist

Tom Crosslin (November 10, 1954 – September 3, 2001) was a marijuana rights activist who was shot and killed on his "Rainbow Farm" by an FBI agent.

== Personal life ==
Crosslin was born in Elkhart, Indiana. Growing up he became very interested in hippy culture along with libertarian ideologies. In the early 1980s, Crosslin moved to Michigan. Crosslin was an out gay man, meeting his life partner, Rolland “Rollie” Rohm, in the early 1990s. Crosslin purchased Rainbow Farm in 1993.

== Rainbow Farm ==
Rainbow Farm was a campground run by Tom Crosslin and his life partner Rolland "Rollie" Rohm and home to two controversial festivals, HempAid on Memorial Day and Roach Roast on Labor Day. The owner of Rainbow Farm supported the "medical, spiritual, and responsible recreational uses of marijuana for a more sane and compassionate America". Rainbow Farm was the focus of an intensive investigation by Cass County prosecutor Scott Teter. The investigation eventually came to a head in early September 2001 with the burning down of all the structures on the property and the shooting deaths of both Tom Crosslin and Rolland Rohm.

== Timeline ==
- 1993: Tom Crosslin buys the property for Rainbow Farm in Vandalia, Michigan. The farm begins holding annual "hemp festivals".
- 1996: Scott Teter is elected Cass County prosecutor.
- 1999–2000: Rainbow Farm campaigns for the Personal Responsibility Amendment, a failed measure that sought to legalize private use of marijuana.
- May 2001: Crosslin and his lover, Rolland Rohm, are arrested for growing marijuana in their house. Rohm's son, Robert, is placed in foster care.
- August 2001: Crosslin and Rohm skip their court date and begin systematically setting fire to Rainbow Farm.
- September 2001: Crosslin is killed by FBI sharpshooters on September 3; Rohm is shot the next morning.

== Popular culture ==
In 2025, a film Burning Rainbow Farm based on the story was made starring Sebastian Stan and Leo Woodall.
