= Hostage Rescue Team =

Elite tactical unit of the Federal Bureau of Investigation

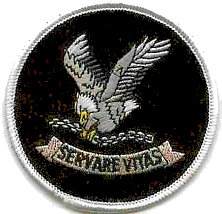
- Patch of the Hostage Rescue Team
- Active: August 1983–present
- Country: United States
- Agency: Federal Bureau of Investigation
- Type: Police tactical unit
- Role: Law enforcement; Counter-terrorism
- Operations jurisdiction: National; International
- Part of: Critical Incident Response Group
- Headquarters: Quantico, Virginia, U.S.
- Motto: Servare Vitas "To save lives"
- Abbreviation: HRT

Structure
- Operators: 149 (2020)

Commanders
- Notable commanders: Danny Coulson; Richard M. Rogers; Roger Nisley; James Yacone; Kevin Cornelius; D.J. Hathaway; David Sundberg

The Hostage Rescue Team (HRT) is the Federal Bureau of Investigation's (FBI) elite tactical unit. The HRT was formed to provide a full-time federal law enforcement tactical capability to respond to major terrorist incidents throughout the United States. Today, the HRT performs a number of tactical law enforcement and national security functions in high-risk environments and conditions and has deployed overseas, including with military Joint Special Operations Command (JSOC) units. In an article to mark its 40th anniversary, it was reported that since its formation in 1983 the HRT had deployed more than 900 times.

The HRT, along with the Crisis Negotiation Unit (CNU), the SWAT Operations Unit that manages the field office SWAT program, and the Tactical Helicopter Unit (THU), comprise the Tactical Section of the FBI's Critical Incident Response Group (CIRG). The Hostage Rescue Team was founded in 1983 by Danny Coulson, former Deputy Assistant Director of the FBI, and completed its final certification exercise in October 1983.

== History ==
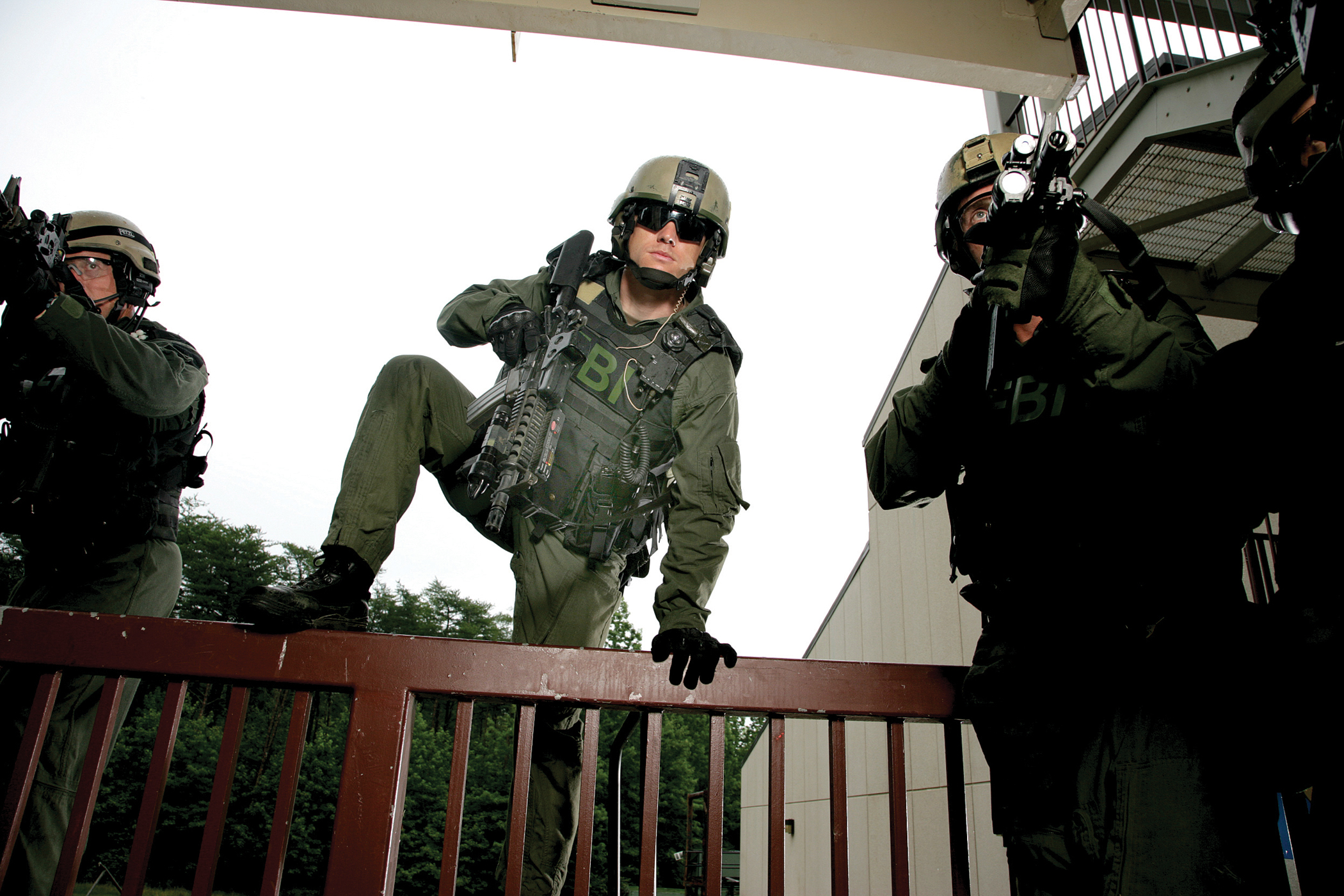
FBI HRT agents in June 2006

The HRT was conceived during the late 1970s after FBI director William H. Webster witnessed a demonstration by the U.S. Army's Delta Force. When Webster reviewed the equipment used by the force he noticed there were no handcuffs. An operator told him:

"We put two rounds in their forehead. The dead don't need handcuffs."

The HRT was to be an augmented SWAT and counter-terrorist team, capable of handling extraordinary hostage situations, large-scale counter-terrorist operations, situations involving nuclear or biological agents, or operations that local law enforcement or the regional FBI field office were not trained or equipped to handle.

Final approval for the HRT was given in early 1982, and formal planning began in March that year.

The initial HRT selection course was held in June 1982 and consisted of three groups of 30 candidates each. Most candidates were experienced SWAT team members and former military veterans including former Navy SEAL Thomas R. Norris.

Of this group, 50 candidates were selected to continue to more advanced training.

The final touches were added to the facilities just before Thanksgiving 1982 and, after a short holiday break, the team began its initial training program.

After receiving tactical SWAT instruction, each individual was given expertise to research, such as explosives and door breaching tactics. Each operator also served as a liaison to one of the existing elite counter-terrorism teams from around the world.

As part of their liaison duties, the men attended training exercises held by their assigned counter-terrorism unit and shared their experiences with the team. The team spent most of January 1983 honing their shooting and tactical skills at Quantico, and then traveled to Fort Bragg, North Carolina, in February for a month of training and instruction with Delta Force. The team returned to Quantico for further training. It became operational in August 1983.

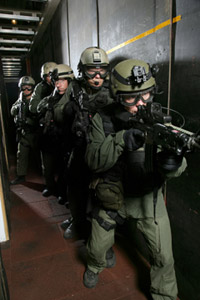
Hostage Rescue Team agents

The team's final certification exercise, code-named Operation Equus Red, was held in October 1983 at Kirtland Air Force Base, New Mexico. During the exercise, the HRT, a local SWAT team, and a United States Department of Energy Nuclear Emergency Search Team (NEST) were tasked with assaulting a terrorist stronghold.

The "terrorist" group was also believed to be in possession of a simulated nuclear device, which was at a separate location and had to be recovered or neutralized. After the NEST aircraft confirmed the location of the device, HRT operators infiltrated the terrorist safe house, secured the device, and managed to "kill" the terrorist involved in approximately 30 seconds.

The FBI's senior leadership viewed the exercise as a complete success and granted final approval for the team to become fully operational.

Upon completion of the certification exercise, the HRT began to expand its capabilities by sending small teams of operators out for more specialized training courses.

Approximately a dozen operators visited Naval Amphibious Base Coronado to receive combat diver, maritime operations, and tactics (such as visit, board, search, and seizure—VBSS) training from the United States Navy SEALs. Other team members conducted helicopter operations and aerial insertion training with the US Army's Task Force 160.

Every operator also received 80 hours of medical training. The HRT traveled to Camp Peary, near Williamsburg, Virginia, for counter-terrorism training courses to develop skills in breaching barricades, running roadblocks, and defensive driving.

Over time, HRT operators studied with the U.S. military, along with local, federal, and foreign tactical teams, and attended private courses to learn more about air assault tactics, rappelling, close quarters combat, chemical agents, terrorist psychology, surveillance methods, sniping/counter-sniping, communications and more. Tactics learned during training were shared with the team.

Eventually, for close quarter battle training, the HRT decided to make things more realistic on advice from SEAL Team Six (later known as the United States Naval Special Warfare Development Group or DEVGRU) commander Richard Marcinko, and the HRT introduced blood bags and wax bullets. The wax bullets were used for team-versus-team drills.

The HRT became part of the Critical Incident Response Group (CIRG) upon its formation in 1994, due to the need to consolidate the assets necessary to respond to a critical incident in one group. Since being added to CIRG, HRT has been used to conduct law enforcement operations and counterterrorism operations globally, sometimes deploying with military special operations forces and intelligence units.

== Capabilities ==
The HRT's equipment and tactics are the most advanced of the FBI's 56 SWAT teams and the 14 enhanced SWAT teams.

The HRT's capabilities are distinguished because the HRT operators (assault and sniper teams) serve full-time and train daily.

The HRT has the ability "to deploy within four hours, with part or all of its personnel and resources, to any location within the United States or its territories". The unit is able to operate in a variety of environments (chemical, extreme cold, night and low-light, or rural environments).

The HRT's tactical teams have the ability to fast-rope, a technique in which the team rapidly descends a rope from the side of a helicopter. This technique is useful for deploying troops into an area where a helicopter cannot touch down.

Even more advanced capabilities are possessed by the HRT, including High Altitude Low Opening (HALO) parachute operations, to name just one. The HRT's capabilities include advanced ground tactics, advanced maritime operations, and advanced tactical aviation operations.

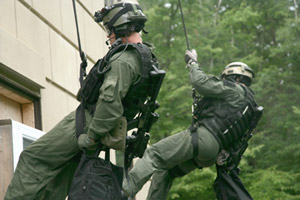
HRT operators in training

=== Maritime capabilities ===
Hostage Rescue Team using fast assault boats

The HRT, as a whole, possesses enhanced capabilities in the maritime domain, including advanced "breaching" capabilities (the ability to circumvent locked doors aboard a ship) and ship-boarding capabilities.

The HRT has vessels that are outfitted for maritime assaults, most of which have been upgraded since 2004.

HRT also has a specialized maritime team with additional maritime capabilities including subsurface diving, closed-circuit diving (scuba gear that does not emit bubbles), and combat swimming undergoing the second phase of BUD/S.

In addition operators of the maritime assault team element are also qualified to pilot and operate a freighter.

=== Aviation capabilities ===
Hostage Rescue Team helicopter hovering atop a mountain

The HRT's Tactical Aviation Unit is staffed by FBI special agents. The Tactical Helicopter Unit, a sub-unit of the Tactical Aviation Unit, contains a variety of specially modified helicopters.

These include military converted tactical Sikorsky UH-60 Black Hawks and tactically enhanced Bell 407s and Bell 412s.

Unlike the military, whose aircraft are not always in the same location as their tactical operators, the HRT's Tactical Helicopter Unit is in the vicinity of HRT central command.

The HRT's tactical aviators are required to fly daily.

=== Training facilities ===
In addition to the HRT's own facilities, the HRT routinely uses private and 1st SFOD-D Delta Force shoot houses and ranges. The HRT has also been known to train at Camp Peary and Harvey Point.

== Organization ==
Name	Speciality	Ref.
Gold Squadron	Maritime	
Silver Squadron (formerly Red)	Buildings and hardpoints	
Blue Squadron	Tubed structures (buses, trains, planes)	

== Roles ==
The primary roles of the HRT are hostage rescue and counter-terrorism. Secondary roles of the HRT include:

- Apprehending barricaded subjects;
- Executing helicopter operations and rescue missions;
- Executing mobile assaults;
- Performing high-risk raids, searches, arrests, and warrants;
- Coordinating manhunt and rural operations
- Providing force protection for FBI personnel overseas.

To a lesser extent, the HRT may deploy teams or individual operators to act as snipers, or to provide protective service details for certain high-profile federal witnesses or dignitaries.

Teams provide support for missions overseas and support Joint Terrorism Task Forces.

Teams at home and abroad perform typical law enforcement activities, such as making arrests, processing scenes for evidence recovery, and testifying in court.

The HRT has provided traditional law enforcement during hurricane relief operations, tactical surveys, and special events such as the Olympic Games, presidential inaugurations, and political conventions.

== Selection and training ==
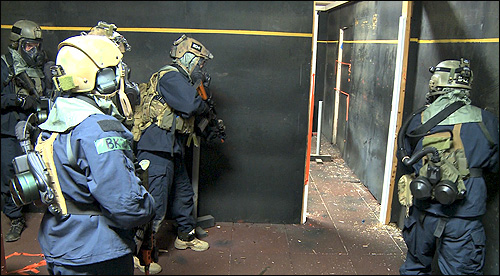
FBI HRT operators prepare to storm a room during CQC exercises.

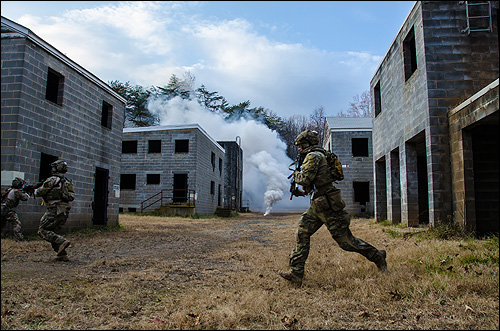
HRT operators participate in an urban assault training exercise.

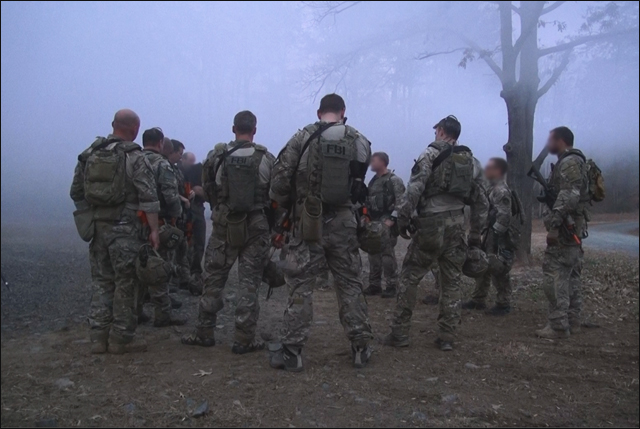
HRT operators review actions following an urban assault training exercise.

Prospective HRT operators are selected based upon their background and experience, as well as their demonstrated performance during the HRT selection course.

=== Selection course ===
The rigorous two-week selection process includes long-distance runs, forced marches, obstacle courses, and other tests of physical and mental stamina.

Throughout the entire selection process, candidates are evaluated on their ability to think under pressure and to perform whilst physically exhausted.

=== NOTS ===
After a six-month initial training period known as "New Operator Training School" ("NOTS"), they are headquartered at the FBI Academy in Quantico, Virginia.

Both the selection course and NOTS are near mirror images of the 1st SFOD-D ("Delta Force") selection and training courses, with some minor adjustments for mission differences.

=== Role-based training ===
Experienced HRT operators assigned to observer/sniper teams are sent to the United States Marine Corps Scout Sniper Basic Course. After successfully completing the course, they receive further instruction from HRT snipers.

Maritime HRT operators are sent to a variety of maritime special operations courses, including Phase II of U.S. Navy BUD/S at Naval Amphibious Base, Coronado, California.

=== Full-time training ===
When not deployed, the HRT conducts full-time training for its members at various locations throughout the country.

Two to three hours each day are set aside for physical training, a defensive tactics session, and combative training.

One day a week is devoted to maintaining either perishable skills (such as fast roping, breaching, and photography) or specialized skills (such as mobile assaults, manhunt and rural operations), maritime operations, helicopter operations, parachuting, weapons of mass destruction training (provided by the United States Department of Energy), and cold weather operations.

During a routine week of training, it is not unusual for HRT operators to fire thousands of rounds to keep their shooting skills honed with the HRT also participating in combined exercises that may involve a variety of governmental entities, such as the FBI and the Departments of Defense, State, Energy, and Homeland Security.

=== Rotation ===
Three teams rotate through three 120-day cycles: training, operations, and support.

During the training cycle, the team refreshes its skills and takes part in exercises, attends other courses, or trains with foreign and domestic units.

During the operations cycle, the team is available for deployment (domestic or foreign). During the support cycle, the team works on special projects, maintains the HRT's equipment, and conducts research.

== Training ==
The HRT is known to conduct joint training exercises and participate in exchange programs with some U.S. military units such as the Army's Combat Applications Group (otherwise known as 1st SFOD-D or Delta Force) or the Navy's DEVGRU (SEAL Team Six).

The HRT routinely trains with other federal tactical teams such as the DEA's FAST Team, the United States Border Patrol's BORTAC unit or the United States Capitol Police's CERT.

Occasionally, the HRT trains with the French GIGN, British SAS and SBS, Irish ERU, Australia’s SRG, German GSG 9, Italy’s GIS and other international units as well as assist in the formation of corresponding units within the NATO framework such as the Hellenic Coast Guard Special Missions Echelons (ΚΕΑ ΛΣ/ΕΛ.ΑΚΤ.).

== Equipment ==
The Hostage Rescue Team uses a wide variety of equipment.

=== Firearms ===
Pistols

- Glock 17M MOS (9×19mm Parabellum)
- Springfield Custom Professional 1911-A1 (.45 ACP)

Sub-machine guns

- MP5SD6 (9×19mm Parabellum)
- MP5/10A3 (10mm Auto)

Assault rifles

- Heckler & Koch HK416

Shotguns

- Benelli M4 (12-gauge)
- Remington Model 870 (12-gauge)

Machine guns

- M249 light machine gun (5.56×45mm NATO)
- M240 machine gun (7.62×51mm NATO)

Sniper rifles

- Heckler & Koch MSG90 (7.62×51mm NATO)
- Custom Remington Model 700 (7.62×51mm NATO)
- Barrett M82 (.50 BMG)

Grenade launchers

- Single and multi-shot 37mm gas launchers
- M79 grenade launcher (40×46mm)

=== Vehicles ===
Convoy of Polaris MRZR all-terrain vehicles driven by the Hostage Rescue Team

- Polaris MRZR

=== Aircraft ===
The HRT's helicopters are operated by their Tactical Helicopter Unit.

The HRT can also make use of aircraft belonging to the Critical Incident Response Group's Aviation Special Operations Unit.

- MD Helicopters MD 530
- Bell 407
- Bell 412EP
- Sikorsky UH-60 Black Hawk

== Notable operators ==
- Danny Coulson: FBI HRT founder and former commander. Later, Coulson became the deputy assistant director of the FBI. Prior to creating the HRT, Coulson served on one of the FBI SWAT teams, more specifically a sniper team, and he later commanded one of the most active SWAT teams in the FBI. In 1984, Coulson led a team of FBI agents to apprehend the neo-Nazi terrorist Robert Jay Matthews on Whidbey Island; while Matthews died in the ensuing shootout, no FBI personnel were harmed. In November 1987, Coulson was the FBI's tactical commander tasked with handling the Atlanta prison riots. Later appointed the Special Agent in Charge of the FBI's Dallas office, Coulson served as one of the Bureau's commanders of the investigation of the Oklahoma City bombing. Coulson retired from the FBI in 1997. As of July 2009, Danny Coulson is a successful security consultant, author, and guest speaker.
- Lon Horiuchi: Former FBI HRT operator and sniper who shot Vicky Weaver in the head while she was holding her infant daughter during the Ruby Ridge standoff. Horiuchi was also deployed during the Waco Siege. He was later charged with manslaughter for the death of Vicky Weaver, but the charges were dismissed. It has been reported that prior to the Oklahoma City bombing, terrorist Timothy McVeigh had plotted to assassinate Horiuchi.
- Christopher Whitcomb: Former FBI HRT operator and sniper. Whitcomb spent 15 years with the FBI and was involved with the Waco Siege, Los Angeles riots of 1992, and Ruby Ridge. As of February 2012, Whitcomb is an American author and appeared as an "expert" on the NBC game show Identity.
- James K. McAllister: The first of the HRT's four known casualties. Special Agent McAllister died on April 18, 1986, after falling out of a helicopter during an HRT training exercise at the FBI Academy in Quantico, Virginia. McAllister had been one of the original 50 members of the Hostage Rescue Team. McAllister had first joined the FBI as a support employee in 1970 before becoming a special agent in 1976. He first worked as a special agent in Baltimore and New York before being assigned to the Washington D.C where he joined the HRT in 1983. His wife, Kimberly, was also an FBI agent and the couple had two children together.
- Sean M. Joyce: 14th deputy director of the FBI. Joyce served for over 26 years in the FBI. Besides his service in the HRT, Joyce was also a Joint Terrorism Task Force Supervisor, Section Chief of the Counterterrorism Division's International Terrorism Operations Section, Assistant Director of the International Operations Division and a SWAT Team Commander. Joyce was appointed Deputy Director of the FBI in 2011 and held that office until 2013; in this capacity, he had daily oversight of the FBI's 36,000 personnel and its multi-billion dollar budget.
- Gregory J. Rahoi: The second HRT casualty, Gregory Rahoi died on December 6, 2006. Rahoi was accidentally shot and fatally wounded at Fort A.P. Hill in Caroline County, Virginia, during a live fire tactical training exercise designed to prepare him for his deployment to Iraq. Rahoi had been assigned to the HRT for six years, during which he served three tours in Iraq. He worked as a firefighter, paramedic, police officer, and lawyer in Wisconsin prior to joining the FBI. He earned an undergraduate degree in criminology and sociology from Marquette University in 1989 and earned a Juris Doctor degree from Marquette University Law School in 1993. He served for one year as a police officer in the town of Shorewood, Wisconsin before transferring to the Madison Police Department prior to joining the FBI in 1997. He was selected for the HRT in 2000. He was posthumously awarded the FBI Medal of Valor for acts of heroism during his final Iraq tour, and his family was presented with the FBI Memorial Star.
- Thomas R. Norris: Original member of the HRT as an assault team leader. Former US Navy SEAL, Vietnam War veteran and a Medal of Honor recipient. Rescued Air Force Lieutenant Colonel Iceal Hambleton in the infamous Rescue of Bat 21 Bravo. He later lost an eye during a mission in Vietnam and was known for being the first HRT member with one eye. Norris applied to join the FBI in 1979 but had to request a medical waiver due to the loss of his eye. Then-director of the FBI William Webster personally waived the medical requirement after Norris passed the Bureau's preliminary examinations. Norris served as an FBI agent for 20 years.
- Stephen P. Shaw: The third or fourth (see below) of the Hostage Rescue Team's casualties. On May 17, 2013, Shaw took part in a helicopter-based, maritime counterterrorism exercise off the coast of Virginia Beach, Virginia. Shaw was preparing to fast-rope from his helicopter onto the deck of a ship as part of the exercise, but the helicopter experienced technical difficulties and spun out of control. Shaw fell from the helicopter into the sea; it is believed that he was killed upon impact. Shaw's HRT teammate, Christopher Lorek, was also killed in the accident. Shaw had joined the FBI as a special agent in 2005 and had previously worked in U.S. Immigration and Customs Enforcement.
- Christopher Lorek: The third or fourth (see above) of the Hostage Rescue Team's casualties. On May 17, 2013, Lorek took part in a helicopter-based, maritime counterterrorism exercise off the coast of Virginia Beach, Virginia. Lorek was preparing to fast-rope from his helicopter onto the deck of a ship as part of the exercise, but the helicopter experienced technical difficulties and spun out of control. Lorek fell from the helicopter into the sea; it is believed that he was killed upon impact. Lorek's HRT teammate, Stephen Shaw, was also killed in the accident. Lorek graduated from Texas A&M University in 1993 and first joined the FBI as a support employee in 1996 before becoming a special agent in 1998.
- Gordon M. Snow: A graduate of the University of Michigan and United States Marine Corps veteran, Snow joined the FBI in 1992. Snow was assigned to the Hostage Rescue Team in 1996, taking part in numerous sensitive operations and was attached to the State Department; during this time, he took part in investigations of the bombing of the USS Cole and the bombings of the U.S. Embassy in Nairobi, Kenya. In 2001, Snow was appointed the Director of Counterintelligence for the Middle East. In 2005, Snow was appointed Chief of the FBI's Weapons of Mass Destruction and Acquisition of U.S. Nuclear & Missile Technology Unit at FBI Headquarters. In 2007, Snow deployed to Afghanistan as the on-scene commander of the FBI's Counterterrorism Division. He was later appointed the Assistant Director of the FBI's Cyber Division in 2009 and held that position until retiring from the Bureau in 2012. He now serves as the Director of physical security for the Cleveland Clinic in Cleveland, Ohio.
- James A. Gagliano: A 25-year FBI veteran. Gagliano graduated from West Point in 1987 and served as an infantry officer in the U.S. Army before becoming an FBI special agent in 1991. He was selected for the Hostage Rescue Team in 1997, taking part in numerous operations before returning to the New York Office in 2002, where he was appointed SWAT Team Leader, commanding one of the Bureau’s most active SWAT teams. From 2002 to 2003, he deployed three times to Afghanistan as the FBI attachment to the U.S. military's Joint Special Operations Command. He was later appointed the Crisis Management Coordinator of the FBI's New York Office, having oversight of the SWAT team, Special Agent Bomb Technicians and other hazardous first response elements. He also served as the Deputy Legal Attaché and Acting Legal Attaché in Mexico City, Mexico and served as the Special Assistant to the Assistant Director in Charge, Chief of Staff for the FBI's New York Office. Retiring from the FBI in late 2015, Gagliano joined CNN as a law enforcement analyst and served as an adjunct professor at St. John's University in New York City, teaching courses on national security. He is also a doctoral candidate at St. John's.
- Jay Tabb: A graduate of Texas A&M University. Tabb served 7 years as an active duty U.S. Marine Corps infantry officer and joined the FBI in 1997. He served for several years as an investigator, special agent bomb technician and SWAT operator. He served with the HRT from 2004 to 2009, taking part in numerous counterterrorism missions worldwide. During his tenure with the HRT, he was critically wounded on two separate operations. For his service, the FBI honored him with the FBI Medal of Valor as well as two FBI stars. He also held leadership positions in the Critical Incident Response Group and the Counterterrorism Division. For his service, he was awarded the Exceptional Service Award by the U.S. Attorney General in 2010 and in 2013 was awarded the Exceptional Service Medal by the Director of National Intelligence.
- Brian Driscoll: FBI Director

== Operations ==
Since its inception, the HRT has been involved in many of the FBI's most high-profile cases, executing numerous operations involving domestic militant groups, terrorists, and violent criminals. The first test of the team's capabilities came in the summer of 1984 when the team deployed to Los Angeles as part of the security buildup prior to the 1984 Summer Olympic Games.

Some cases have brought the HRT heavy media attention. The HRT came under increased public and Congressional scrutiny, along with federal law enforcement in general, due to what some saw as heavy-handed tactics used at Waco and Ruby Ridge.

In the aftermath of the USS Cole bombing, HRT had a rare full deployment to Yemen. Under the authority of the Yemeni Government, brokered by the State Department, HRT performed personal protection for FBI investigators and participated in capture operations with the Central Intelligence Agency against suspects in the bombing.

On the other hand, the HRT has been involved in over 200 successful missions, both in the US and abroad. Many of these operations have received little or no attention from the world press, such as the unit's combat operations in Iraq and Afghanistan.

Some higher-profile cases include the Waco siege; the Ruby Ridge standoff; the capture of the suspected masterminds of the 1998 United States embassy bombings in Africa; the rescue following the 2013 abduction of a five-year-old boy in Alabama; along with Delta Force, the capture of Ahmed Abu Khattala, a terrorist who participated in the 2012 Benghazi attack; the rescue of prison guards at Talladega, Alabama, and St. Martinville, Louisiana; an arrest in Watertown, Massachusetts, related to the manhunt for Dzhokhar Tsarnaev, one of two perpetrators of the Boston Marathon bombing of April 15; the 2013 rescue of Hannah Anderson; the 2014 rescue of kidnap victim Frank Arthur Janssen; the capture of Eric Frein, the sole suspect in the 2014 Pennsylvania State Police barracks attack; the protection of the 2016 Republican National Convention and the 2016 Democratic National Convention; the 2016 occupation of the Malheur National Wildlife Refuge, the rescue of three hostages in the 2022 Colleyville synagogue hostage crisis, and the 2023 Greenspoint Hostage Crisis. In January 2026, the HRT participated in the military operation to capture Nicolás Maduro. In June 2026, the HRT deployed to Bakersfield, California after Anthony Scott Searles-Harris took ten Kern County Superintendent of Schools' office employees hostage on the second floor of a Chase Bank building. He claimed that he had explosive devices attached to him and to some hostages. HRT entered the building, fatally shot him and safely recovered all the hostages unharmed.

== Casualties ==
The HRT has suffered four known fatalities, all training related. The first was James K. McAllister, who died during a fast rope training exercise in 1986. The second known fatality was Gregory J. Rahoi, who died in a live fire exercise in 2006.

In May 2005, an FBI HRT McDonnell Douglas 530 helicopter crashed while conducting a fast rope exercise. Crew members sustained injuries, but none were life-threatening.

On May 17, 2013, HRT suffered two fatalities, Christopher Lorek and Stephen Shaw, involving a helicopter while training off the coast of Virginia Beach.

== See also ==
- DSS Mobile Security Deployments
- List of police tactical units
- Secret Service Counter Assault Team
- SWAT
