= Rainbow Farm =

Pro-marijuana commune in Michigan (1996–2001)

Coordinates: 41°55′41″N 85°52′17″W

- Date: August 23 – September 3, 2001
- Location: Newberg Township, Michigan
- Caused by: FBI and local police forces attempt to raid Rainbow Farm and arrest owners Tom Crosslin and Rolland Rohm for drug violations and skipping bail.
- Result: Crosslin and Rohm are killed. Rainbow Farm burns down.

Parties
Crosslin, Rohm, and friends	FBI and local police forces

Casualties and losses
2 killed 1 injured	none

Rainbow Farm was a pro-marijuana campground in Newberg Township, Michigan, United States, that was involved in a fatal police standoff on September 3, 2001. The campground was run by Tom Crosslin and his life partner Rolland "Rollie" Rohm and was home to two annual festivals, "HempAid" and "Roach Roast", which ran from 1996 through 2001. The operation ended with the burning down, by Crosslin and Rohm, of the structures on the property and the deaths of both Crosslin and Rohm by law enforcement.

== Background ==
Crosslin and Rohm met in the early 1990s when Rohm began living in a group home owned by Crosslin. In the year 1993, Crosslin purchased Rainbow Farm.

Starting in 1996, Rainbow Farm began hosting two annual events, "HempAid" (on Memorial Day) and "Roach Roast" (on Labor Day). Guests included Tommy Chong, High Times editor Steve Hager, Merle Haggard, members of Big Brother and the Holding Company, and more. These events from 1996 through 2001 made Rainbow Farm the center of marijuana activism in Michigan. It was listed by High Times magazine as "fourteenth on the list of twenty-five Top Stoner Travel Spots in the world".

== Investigation and arrests ==
Rainbow Farm was the focus of an investigation by Cass County prosecutor Scott Teter. A Rainbow Farm festival was linked to the death of a Berrien County teenager killed on April 21, 2001, after his car crashed into a school bus carrying Eau Claire High School students. After a few months of unsuccessfully trying to gather evidence using undercover police officers, the investigation eventually came to a head in early May 2001, when Michigan State Police troopers served a tax-fraud warrant and found more than 200 marijuana plants.

Crosslin and Rohm were arrested on felony manufacture and weapons charges, and Rohm's son, Robert, was taken into foster care. Crosslin was charged with felony possession of a firearm, growing marijuana, and maintaining a drug house. He faced 20 years in prison and was out of jail on a $150,000 bail bond, as the state was moving to seize Rainbow Farm under civil asset forfeiture proceedings. During this time, Crosslin publicly violated his bail agreement by announcing that he would throw another festival.

== Standoff ==
In August 2001, Crosslin and Rohm failed to appear at their appointed court date, and set fire to a building on their property. Crosslin and Rohm also began procuring assault rifles and claiming that the farm had been mined and booby-trapped. Believing they were outgunned, the local authorities called in the FBI. The Michigan State Police and FBI agents surrounded Crosslin's house on August 31. Throughout Labor Day weekend, Crosslin and Rohm systematically burned down the ten structures on their farm, shot at and hit a news helicopter filming the fires, shot at and missed a police surveillance plane, and sprayed the woods bordering the 34-acre (140,000 m^{2}) property with gunfire to keep police at bay.

On September 3, Crosslin walked into the woods on his farm, and while walking back, he spotted an FBI agent lying on the ground. Crosslin raised his rifle and was shot in the forehead and died instantly. The autopsy report said Crosslin was shot five times in the head, and three times in the torso. At 3:45 a.m. on September 4, Rohm asked that his son be brought to see him and told police that if he was, he would surrender at 7 a.m. Shortly after 6 a.m., a fire was reported at the Rainbow Farm residence. While walking outside the house Rohm was shot dead by another police marksman. A third man, Brandon J. Peoples, suffered minor injuries when Crosslin was shot.

A film about the standoff based on the book Burning Rainbow Farm: How a Stoner Utopia Went Up in Smoke was announced in 2017. The film is set to star Sebastian Stan as Crosslin and Leo Woodall as Rohm. It was initially planned to be directed by Lenny Abrahamson, but Abrahamson left the project during development and was later replaced by Justin Kurzel.

== See also ==
- Waco Siege
- Bundy Ranch
- Ruby Ridge
- Recapture Canyon
- Montana Freemen
