= Ruby Ridge (southern Boundary County, Idaho) =

Region in northern Idaho, United States

- Location within Idaho Location within the United States

Highest point
- Elevation: 4,616 ft (1,407 m)
- Coordinates: 48.6246555°N 116.4838130°W

Geography
- Location: Kaniksu National Forest
- Country: United States
- State: Idaho
- County: Boundary
- Topo map(s): USGS: Naples, Dodge Peak, Moravia, and Roman Nose

Geology
- Mountain type: Homoclinal ridge

Ruby Ridge is a 4,616-foot (1,407 m) mountain ridge in the Kaniksu National Forest (administered as part of the Idaho Panhandle National Forests) in southern Boundary County, Idaho, United States.

The landform gained notoriety when an armed standoff named after the ridge occurred nearby in late August 1992, in which two civilians and one officer of the United States Marshals Service were killed.
