= List of militia organizations in the United States =

This is a list of active and armed militia organizations in the United States. While the two largest militias are the Oath Keepers and the 3 Percenters, there are numerous smaller groups.

== Background ==
The Southern Poverty Law Center (SPLC) identified 334 militia groups at their peak in 2011. It identified 276 in 2015, up from 202 in 2014. In 2016, the SPLC identified a total of 165 armed militia groups within the United States.

== National groups ==
- Constitutional Sheriffs and Peace Officers Association
- Oath Keepers
- Not Fucking Around Coalition
- Three Percenters
- Guardians of Liberty
- Boogaloo movement
- American Patriots Three Percent
- Veterans on Patrol
- New Black Panther Party

== Statewide groups ==
Militias with a statewide presence (Note: Only includes groups active in at least 2017. Affiliates of the Oath Keepers and III%-styled groups are excluded.)
Name	State	Ref.
Arizona Border Recon (Note: Accepts volunteers throughout the state, but operations are mostly conducted in Sasabe.)	Arizona	
Arizona Liberty Guard	Arizona	
Arizona State Militia	Arizona	
Southern Arizona Militia	Arizona	
Arkansas Defense Force	Arkansas	
First State Pathfinders	Delaware	
Indiana Citizens Volunteer Militia	Indiana	
Kentucky Mountain Rangers	Kentucky	
Louisiana Volunteer Force	Louisiana	
Maine Militia	Maine	
Michigan Home Guard	Michigan	
Michigan Militia	Michigan	
Northwest Lower Michigan Civil Defense	Michigan	
Southeast Michigan Volunteer Militia	Michigan	
Missouri Brotherhood Militia	Missouri	
Missouri Citizens Militia	Missouri	
Missouri Militia	Missouri	
North Country Deplorables	New York	
New York Light Foot Militia	New York	
New York Militia TM	New York	
New York Mutual Assistance Group	New York	
New Mexico Civil Guard	New Mexico	
The Last Militia	Ohio	
Ohio Irregulars	Ohio	
Ohio Valley Minutemen Citizen's Volunteer Militia	Ohio	
West Ohio Minutemen	Ohio	
Appalachian Associators	Pennsylvania	
Iron City Citizen's Response Unit (CRU)	Pennsylvania	
Pennsylvania Armare Woodsmen	Pennsylvania	
Pennsylvania Light Foot Militia	Pennsylvania	
Pennsylvania State Militia	Pennsylvania	
Rhode Island Patriots	Rhode Island	
Texas State Militia	Texas	
This Is Texas Freedom Force	Texas	
Green Mountain Militia	Vermont	
Washington Light Foot Militia	Washington	
West Virginia Light Foot Militia	West Virginia	

== Local groups ==
SPLC identified local militia groups (2018) (Note: Groups excluded are (1) affiliates of Oath Keepers regardless of status as militias, and (2) any self-styled "III%" groups.)
State	Name	Location
Alabama	Alabama Constitutional Militia	Clanton
Alabama	South Alabama Militia	Dothan
Alaska	Alaska Citizens Militia	Nikiski
Arizona	Arizona Freedom Militia	Mohave
Arizona	Northern Arizona Militia	Golden Valley
Arkansas	Arkansas State Militia Corps	Mansfield
California	California State Militia	Bay Area
California	California State Militia	Northern
California	California State Militia	Sacramento County
California	California State Militia	Southern
Florida	Florida Militia	Central
Florida	Florida Militia	Northeast
Florida	Florida Militia	Northwest
Florida	Florida Militia	Southern
Idaho	Idaho Light Foot Militia	Kootenai County
Idaho	Idaho Light Foot Militia	Meridian
Illinois	Illinois Sons of Liberty	Chicago
Indiana	Indiana Citizens Volunteer Militia (Note: Considered to be a statewide group in another source)	Lake County
Kentucky	KY County Rangers	Bath County
Maine	Maine Volunteer Responders	Gardiner
Michigan	Capitol City Militia	Clinton County
Michigan	Genesee County Volunteer Militia	Genesee County
Michigan	Michigan Liberty Militia	Barry County
Michigan	Michigan Peoples' Reactionary Force	Genesee County
Michigan	Michigan Wolf Pack	Gratiot County
Michigan	Southeast Michigan Volunteer Militia	Lapeer County
Michigan	Southeast Michigan Volunteer Militia	Macomb County
Michigan	Southeast Michigan Volunteer Militia	Wayne County
Mississippi	Citizens Militia of Mississippi	Batesville
Mississippi	Citizens Militia of Mississippi	Carroll County
Missouri	417 Second Amendment Militia	Hartville
Missouri	Missouri Citizens Militia	Washington County
Missouri	Missouri Militia	Joplin
Missouri	Missouri Militia	Kansas City
Missouri	Missouri Militia	Springfield
Missouri	Missouri Militia	St. Joseph
New Hampshire	Patriot Mutual Assistance Group	Rindge
New York	New York Lightfoot Militia	Delaware, County
New York	Liberty State Militia	Chenango County
New York	New York Militia TM	Albany County
New York	New York Militia TM	Mohawk Valley Region
New York	New York Mutual Assistance Group	Orange County
New York	New York Mutual Assistance Group	Suffolk County
North Carolina	Stokes County Militia	King
Ohio	The Frontiersmen	Ravenna
Ohio	The Last Militia	Allen County
Ohio	The Last Militia	Butler County
Ohio	The Last Militia	Clark County
Ohio	The Last Militia	Hamilton County
Ohio	The Last Militia	Montgomery County
Ohio	The Last Militia	Summit County
Ohio	The Last Militia	Trumbull County
Ohio	North East Ohio Outdoorsman	East Rochester
Ohio	Ohio Defense Force Home Guard	Cincinnati
Ohio	Ohio Defense Force Home Guard	Cleveland
Ohio	Ohio Defense Force Home Guard	New Lexington
Ohio	Ohio Defense Force Home Guard	Zanesville
Ohio	Reapers Constitutional Militia of Ohio	Cortland
Oregon	Central Oregon Constitutional Guard	Redmond
Pennsylvania	Carlisle Light Infantry	Cumberland County
Pennsylvania	Eastern Pennsylvania Regional Militia	Wyomissing
Pennsylvania	Iron City Citizen's Response Unit (CRU)	Allegheny
Pennsylvania	Pennsylvania Homeland Shield	Clarksburg
Pennsylvania	Pennsylvania Light Foot Militia	Berks County
Pennsylvania	Pennsylvania Light Foot Militia	Bradford County
Pennsylvania	Pennsylvania Light Foot Militia	Juniata County
Pennsylvania	Pennsylvania Light Foot Militia	Luzerne County
Pennsylvania	Pennsylvania Light Foot Militia	Schuylkill County
Pennsylvania	Pennsylvania Light Foot Militia	Tioga County
Pennsylvania	Pennsylvania Light Foot Militia	Westmoreland County
South Carolina	South Carolina Light Foot Militia	Horry County
Tennessee	1st Tennessee Rifles UMIT	Lafayette
Tennessee	East Tennessee Mountain Militia	Knoxville
Tennessee	Tennessee Defence Legion	Chester
Texas	Alamo Militia	San Antonio
Texas	Golden Triangle Militia	Groves
Texas	Golden Triangle Militia	Orange
Texas	Texas Light Foot Militia	Tyler
Texas	Texas State Militia	Austin
Texas	Texas State Militia	Big Spring
Texas	Texas State Militia	Houston
Virginia	Virginia Kekoas	Norfolk
Virginia	Campbell County Militia	Campbell County
Washington	Washington Light Foot Militia	Spokane County
West Virginia	Ohio Valley Minutemen Citizen's Volunteer Militia (Note: Same as the statewide group in Ohio)	Charleston
Wisconsin	Kenosha Guard	Kenosha

== Inactive groups ==
Several militia organizations have since become inactive including:

Name	Location	Ref.
Viper Militia	Arizona	
1st Mechanical Kansas Militia	Kansas	
Kentucky State Militia	Kentucky	
Wolverine Watchmen	Michigan	
Militia of Montana	Montana	
Citizens for Constitutional Freedom	New Mexico	
Boyce´s Tigers	New York	
Ohio Defense Force	Ohio	
Texas Emergency Reserve	Texas	
West Virginia Mountaineer Militia	West Virginia	

== See also ==
- Occupation of the Malheur National Wildlife Refuge
- WHYU-LP, a radio station operated by the American Militia Association
