= NWS publications related to the July 2025 Central Texas floods =

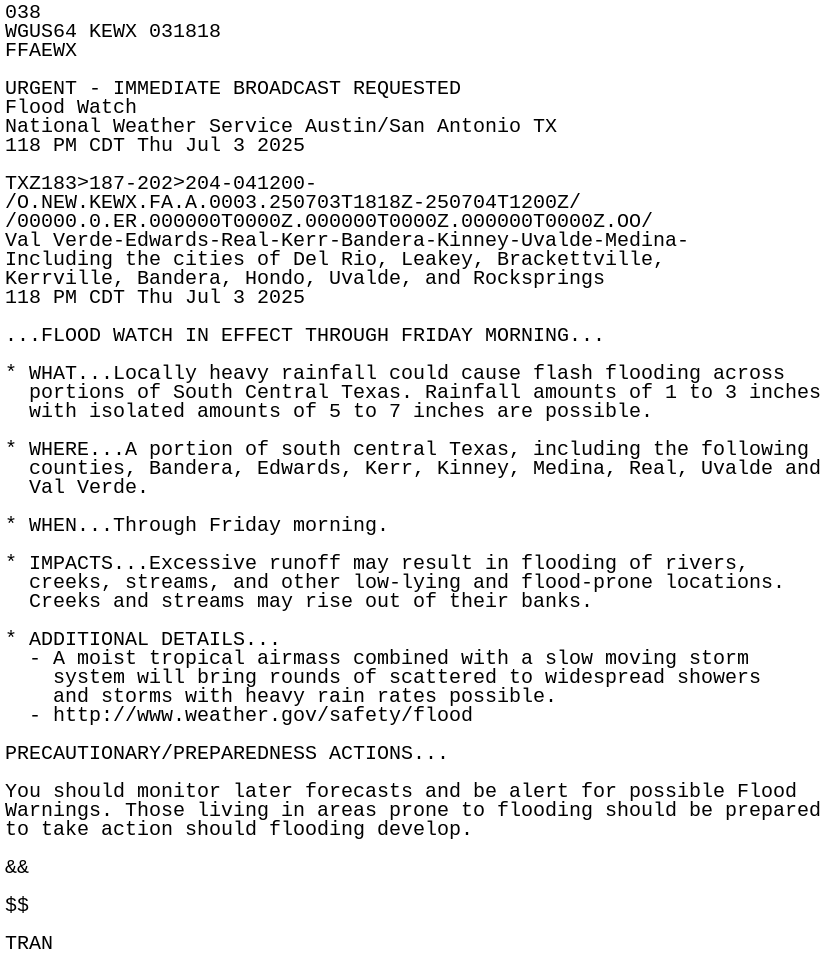
A flood watch issued by the National Weather Service hours before flooding began

Prior to, during, and after the July 2025 Central Texas floods, various branches of the National Weather Service (NWS), including the Weather Prediction Center (WPC) and the National Weather Service Austin/San Antonio, TX office (EWX), issued watches, warnings, and statements regarding the floods. Publications by the NWS for the floods were highly criticized by media outlets and politicians.

== Background ==
In the immediate aftermath of the flooding, Texas Division of Emergency Management Chief Nim Kidd criticized the forecasts from the National Weather Service stating "the amount of rain that fell in this specific location was never in any of those forecasts...It did not predict the amount of rain that we saw." Former officials from NOAA and the NWS stated that "the forecasts were as good as could be expected, given the enormous levels of rainfall and the storm's unusually abrupt escalation" but staffing shortages from recent reductions in the federal workforce "suggested a separate problem (...) the loss of experienced people who would typically have helped communicate with local authorities in the hours after flash flood warnings were issued overnight".

The New York Times reported that the NWS office in San Angelo had several vacancies, including the branch's meteorologist-in-charge, and that the San Antonio office did not have a warning coordination meteorologist after the individual previously in that role took an early retirement as part of the federal workforce reductions. According to Tom Fahy, the legislative director for the National Weather Service Employees Organization, the vacancy rates at both offices had "roughly doubled" since Trump's inauguration in January. However, there was still a normal amount of people working that night, with 5 forecasters on duty when standard protocol is for there to be 2 at night. A Commerce Department spokesman rejected the assertion that the response of the NWS had been inadequate, as did the NWS Union. The current Kerr County judge, Rob Kelly, stated during the floods that "no one knew this kind of flood was coming".

=== Cloud seeding and conspiracies ===
Unfounded conspiracy theories and misinformation across the political spectrum also spread on social media in its aftermath. Influencers associated with QAnon spread conspiracies that the floods were a result of weather control and cloud seeding by the government. Shortly after the flood, Georgia congresswoman Marjorie Taylor Greene introduced a bill to make weather alteration a felony. Anti-government militia Veterans on Patrol called on its members to destroy NEXRAD weather radars. On July 6, a man broke into a radar system operated by News 9 in Oklahoma City and damaged its power supply, briefly knocking it offline. Republican candidate Kandiss Taylor called the events "Fake weather. Fake hurricanes. Fake flooding." Cloud seeding company Rainmaker seeded clouds in prior days in other areas of Texas and reported receiving a number of death threats due to unfounded online accusations of complicity in the floods.

== List ==
Publication	Date, Time (CDT)	Description/Notes
Flood Watch (FAA)	July 3, 1:18 PM	At 1:18 pm CDT on July 3, 2025, several hours before the floods, the National Weather Service Austin/San Antonio, TX (NWS EWX) issued a Flood Watch for portions of south-central Texas, including Kerr County and other areas that would later be impacted by severe flooding. The watch warned of 1–3 inches (25–76 mm) of rain, with isolated areas seeing closer to 5–7 inches (130–180 mm). The watch noted that there would be "rounds of scattered to widespread showers and storms with heavy rain rates possible".
Post on Facebook	July 3, 2:39 PM	An hour after issuing the Flood Watch, NWS EWX posted a graphic and information regarding the Flood Watch on Facebook.
Mesoscale Precipitation Discussion	July 3, 7:10 PM	At 7:10 pm CDT on July 3, the Weather Prediction Center (WPC) issued their first Mesoscale Precipitation Discussion (MPD), with the summary statement of: "Concerning trends for back-building and training thunderstorms over the Texas Hill Country this evening that could produce >3"/hr max rainfall rates".
Flash Flood Warning (FFW)	July 4, 1:14 AM	A Flash Flood Warning for northwestern Bandera County and central Kerr County was issued by the NWS EWX at 1:14 am CDT on July 4. The warning stated that "[f]lash flooding is ongoing or expected to begin shortly." It also contained a "CONSIDERABLE" flash flood damage threat tag.
Mesoscale Precipitation Discussion	July 4, 1:26 AM	The WPC issued a Mesoscale Precipitation Discussion, stating, "areas of flash flooding will be likely across central TX overnight with very heavy rainfall expected". The discussion also stated: "Hourly rainfall in excess of 2 to 3 inches (51–76 mm) seems reasonable given the environment and localized 6-hr totals over 6 inches (150 mm) will be possible", and detailing that the potential flooding may have "significant impacts".
Flash Flood Statement (FFS)	July 4, 1:46 AM	NWS EWX issued an update statement to the Flash Flood Warning for northwestern Bandera and central Kerr Counties. The statement noted that "[b]etween 2 and 4 inches of rain have fallen" and that another "1 to 3 inches are possible in the warned area." The considerable threat tag and message that flash flooding was ongoing from the 1:17 am warning were reiterated in this statement.
Flash Flood Statement (FFS) with Flash Flood Emergency	July 4, 4:07 AM	NWS EWX disseminates the first Flash Flood Emergency message for north-central Kerr County, issued as a Flash Flood Statement, at 4:07 am CDT. The message stated: "This is a FLASH FLOOD EMERGENCY for South-central Kerr County, including Hunt. This is a PARTICULARLY DANGEROUS SITUATION. SEEK HIGHER GROUND NOW!". It also stated: "Move to higher ground now! This is an extremely dangerous and life-threatening situation. Do not attempt to travel unless you are fleeing an area subject to flooding or under an evacuation order." This was the first statement for Kerr County to include the "CATASTROPHIC" flash flood damage threat tag.
Post on Facebook	July 4, 5:10 AM	The National Weather Service posted on Facebook stating the Guadalupe River in Hunt, "continues to rise sharply and has reached 2nd highest height on record, higher than the famous 1987 flood". They also stated, "This is a very dangerous and life-threatening flood event along the Guadalupe River! Move to higher ground!"
Flash Flood Warning (FFW) with Flash Flood Emergency	July 4, 6:06 AM	NWS EWX extended the Flash Flood Emergency for south-central Kerr County to last until 10:00 am that morning. The re-issued warning continued to indicate the catastrophic threat for Kerr County, stating that "[l]ocal law enforcement reported numerous low water crossings flooded and major flooding occurring along the Guadalupe River with rescues taking place. Between 5 and 10 inches of rain have fallen".
Mesoscale Precipitation Discussion	July 4, 6:27 AM	The WPC, issued a Mesoscale Precipitation Discussion, stating, "Areas of high Impact flash flooding will continue for at least another 3-5 hour across portions of central TX. Slow to nearly stationary net movement of heavy rain cores will maintain a threat for hourly rainfall in excess of 3 inches in a couple of locations". They also stated, "Considerable to catastrophic flash flood impacts can continue to be expected".
