= Georgia Republic Militia =

Paramilitary group which plotted bombings around the state

- Leaders: Frank Smith; Robert Starr
- Dates active: 1995-27 April 1996
- Active regions: Georgia, United States
- Ideology: Christian nationalism Conservatism; Nationalist conservatism Libertarianism; Right-wing; Sovereign citizen movement Social conservatism

The Georgia Republic Militia was a militia-movement organization based in Georgia. The group became known for openly campaigning for planning an armed campaign against the federal government of the United States and the seizure of more than a dozen explosive devices.

== History ==
April 26, 1996, the Department and Bureau of Alcohol, Tobacco and Firearms arrest two leaders of the militia group, in addition to confiscating ten pipe bombs and materials for the elaboration of explosives. The first reports said the group planned to attack with explosives buildings used by Summer Olympics in Atlanta. But a senior federal law enforcement official said there was no indication of any connection to attack the Olympics. The authorities arrested the leaders in the rural area of Macon in Georgia, and confirmed that the group counted from 11 to 15 members, apparently hold the bombs at their homes in case of "government irruption", according to a federal sources. In a second raid Robert Starr was arrested in Knoxville, Georgia, during the morning of April 26. Star was armed with a semi-automatic AK-47, a source said, but offered no resistance.

The arrested militants ATF agents uncovered an alleged bomb production site near Macon in rural Georgia after an investigation that intensified when an ATF informant allegedly learned of plans to construct as many as 40 bombs. Members of the Georgia Republic Militia were building and planning to distribute homemade, shrapnel bombs among the group "to defend their rights against the invasion of the government," a federal affidavit states. The investigations start when ATF agents discovered an alleged bomb production site near the town of Macon, Georgia after an investigation that escalated when an ATF informant allegedly learned of plans to build up to 40 bombs. The militants were building and planning to distribute homemade shrapnel bombs among the group "to defend their rights against invasion by the government," says the authorities. Frank Smith, one of the founders of the militia that Starr headed until his arrest, said that the two parted ways after the members began conducting armed maneuvers in the forests.

Various militia members from Georgia condemned the intention of use bombs to "defend his cause".

=== Convictions ===
On November 7, 1996, three militants, including Robert Starr, were convicted of possessing an unregistered destructive device and conspiring to use a pipe bomb. Starr was sentenced to over 8 years in prison, while his two codefendants, William McCranie and Troy Spain, were each sentenced to six years and three months in prison.

== See also ==
- 1st Mechanical Kansas Militia
- Kentucky State University
- Viper Militia
