= July 2025 Central Texas floods =

Natural disaster in Texas, U.S.

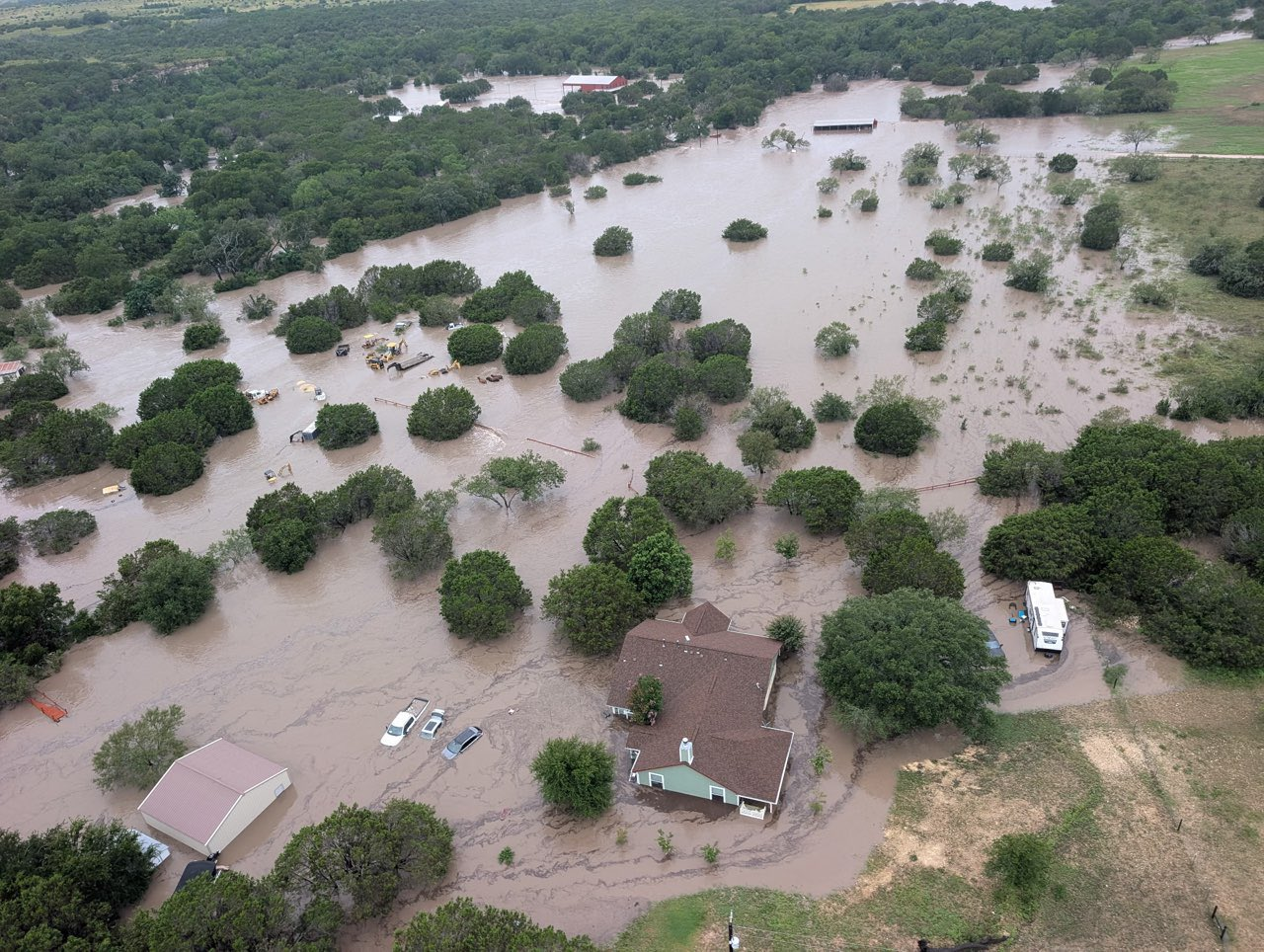
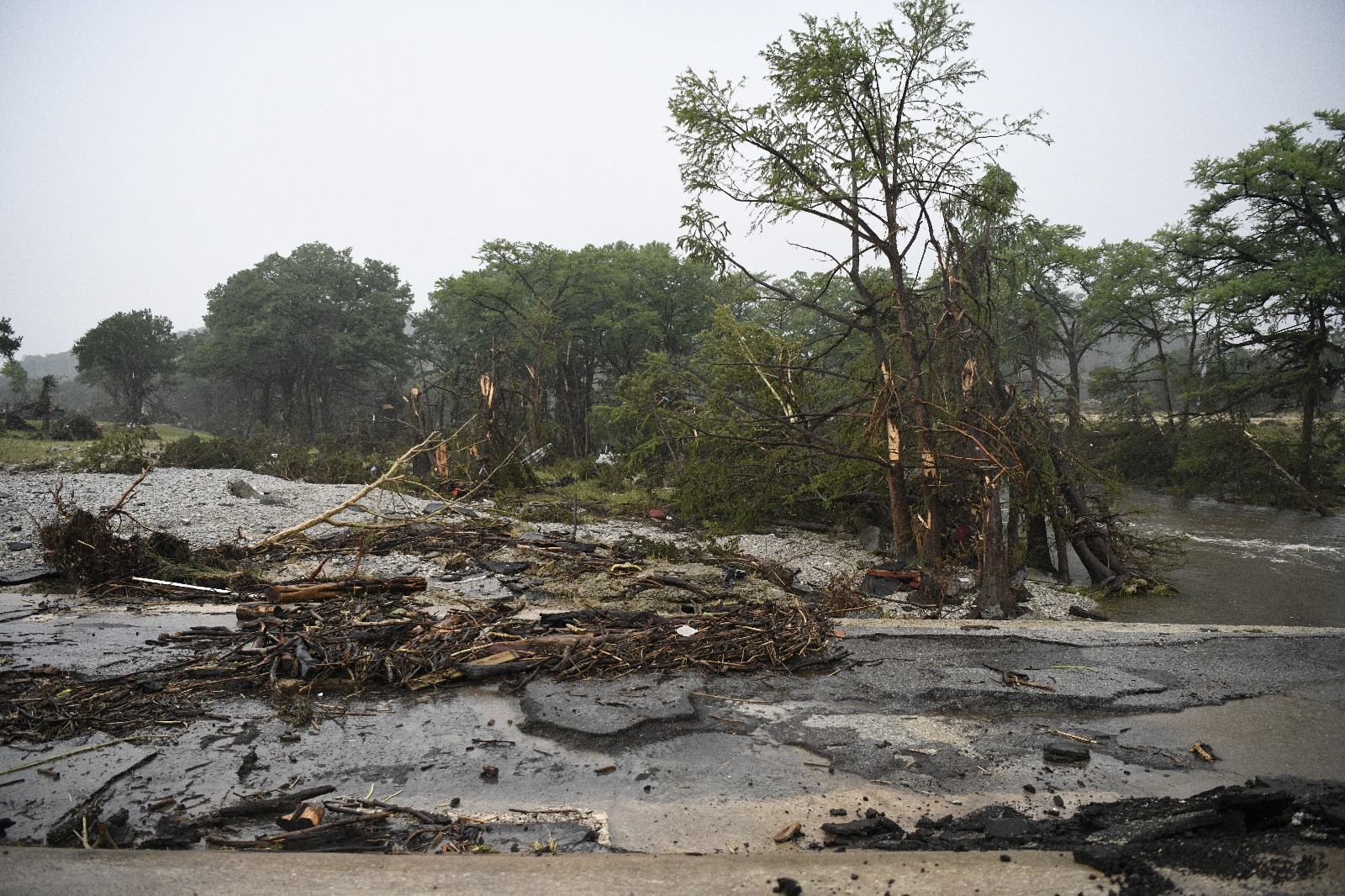
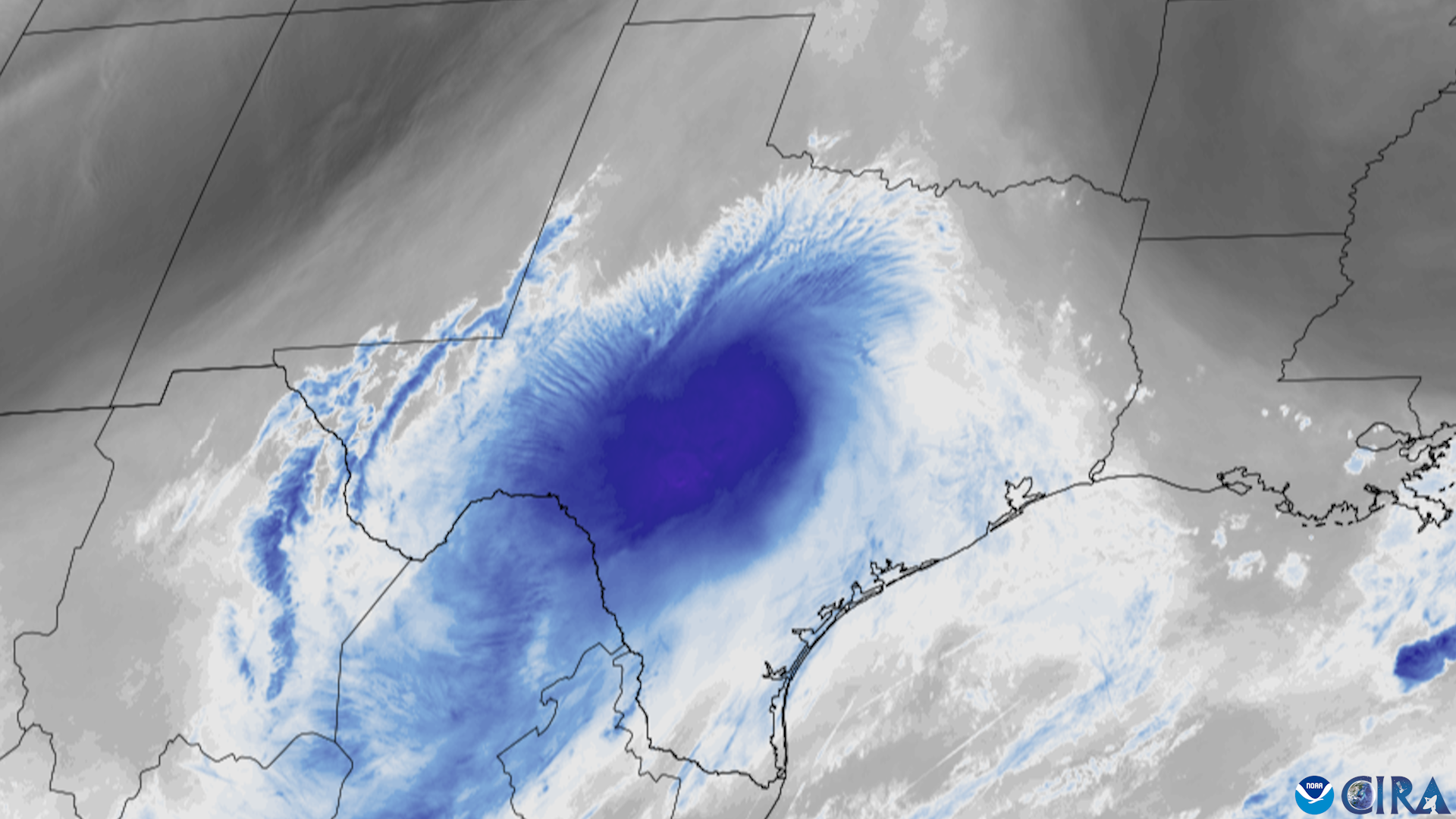
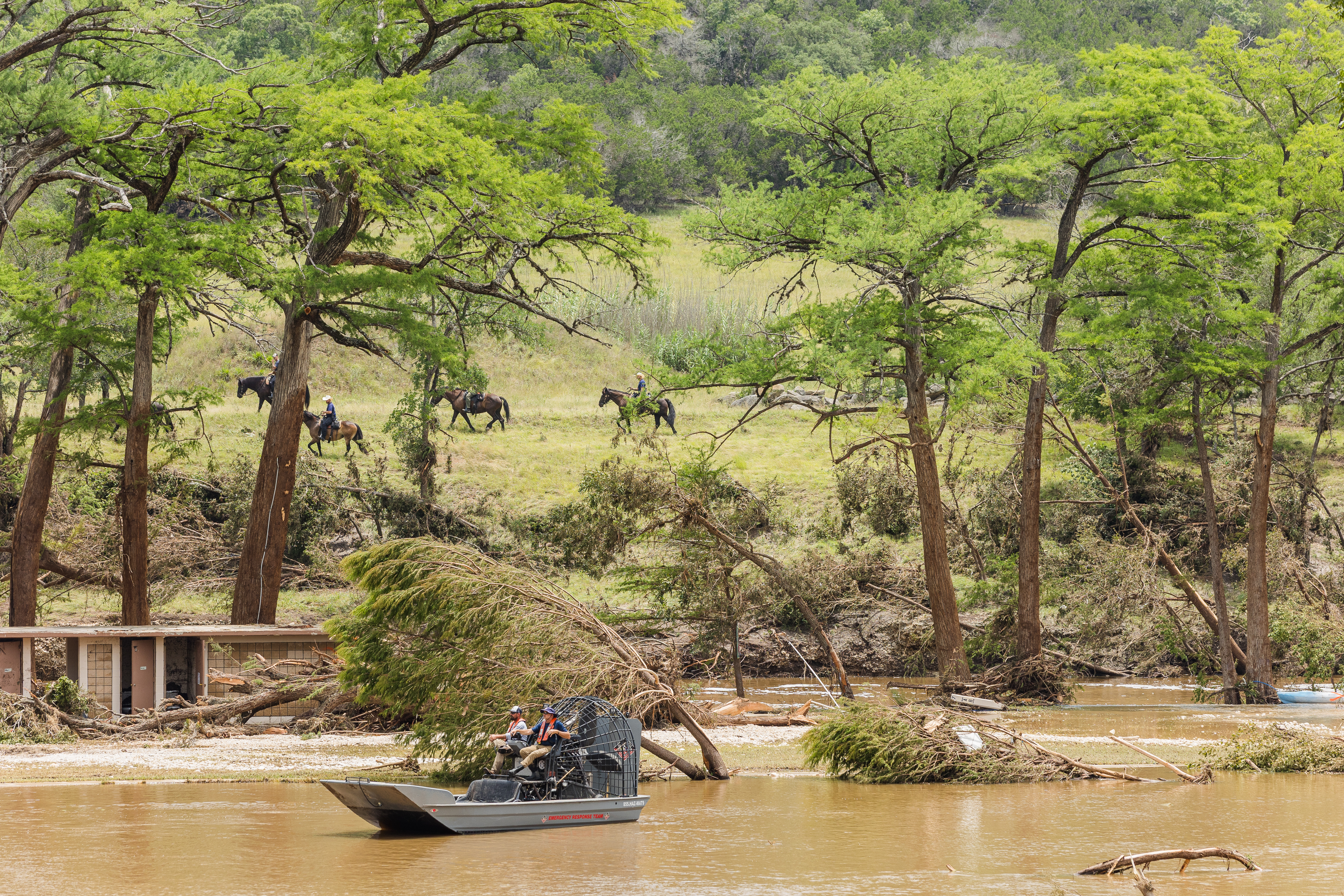
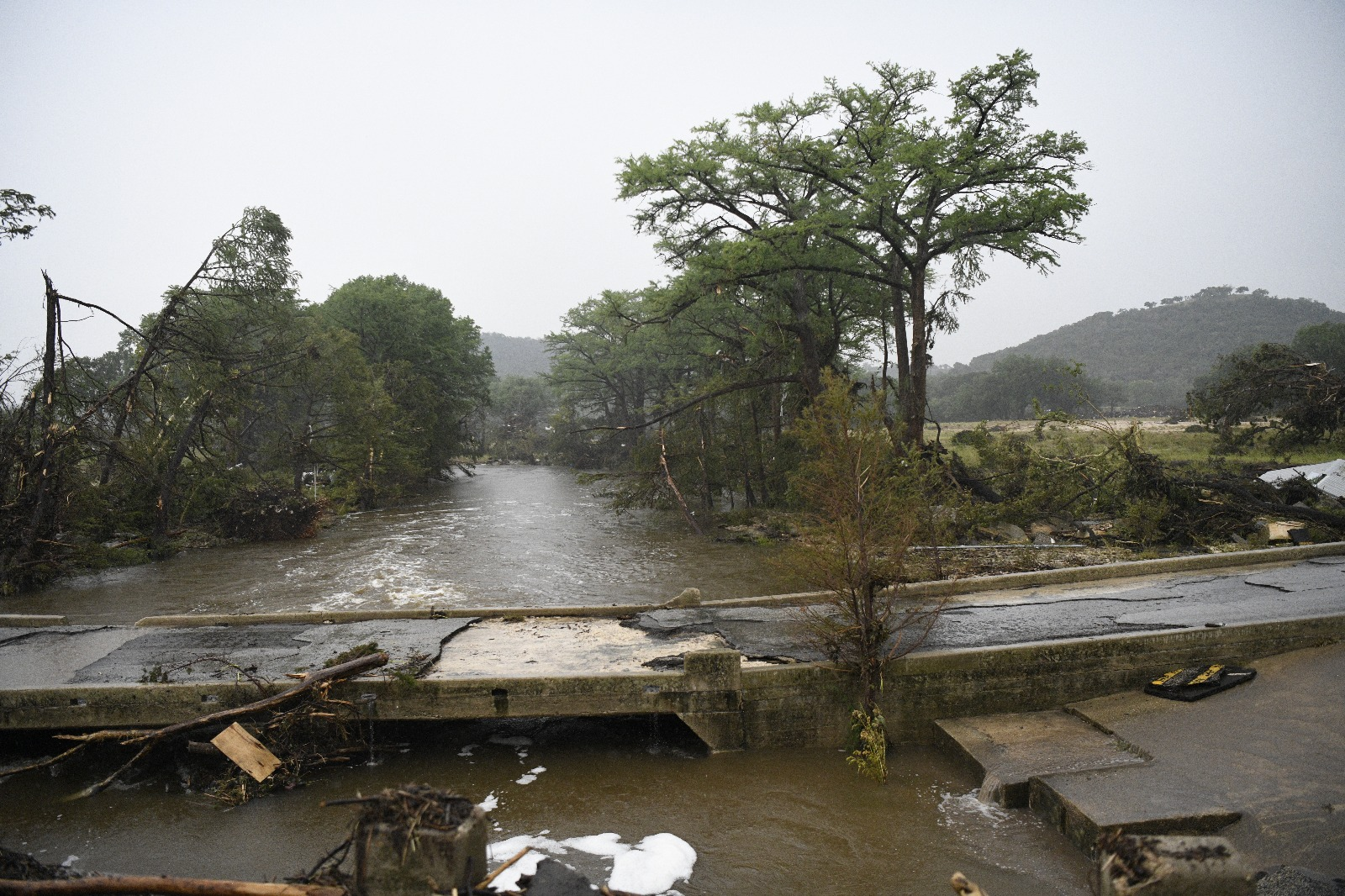
- Clockwise from top: Aerial photo of the heavy flooding near Hunt, Texas, on July 4, 2025. Satellite imagery of the storm responsible for the historic floods. A footbridge damaged by the heavy flooding. Search and rescue operations along the Guadalupe River. Photo of a washed out road and several trees snapped and littered across the ground.
- Cause: Heavy rains due to a mesoscale convective vortex enhanced with tropical moisture

Meteorological history
- Duration: July 4–5, 2025

Flood
- Max. rainfall: 20.33 inches (516.4 mm)

Overall effects
- Fatalities: 139+
- Missing: 2
- Damage: $1.1 billion (2025 USD)
- Areas affected: Texas Hill Country, Central Texas (especially Kerr County), Guadalupe River Watershed

On July 4, 2025, destructive and deadly flooding took place in the Hill Country region of the U.S. state of Texas. During the flooding, water levels along the Guadalupe River rose rapidly. As a result, 136 people were killed and 3 remain missing, with 117 of deaths occurring in Kerr County. The flooding was caused by a mesoscale convective vortex with enhanced tropical moisture.

Flooding began on the morning of July 4, after significant rainfall accumulated across Central Texas. Six flash flood emergencies, which included the cities of Kerrville and Mason, were issued the same day. The Guadalupe River rose about 26 ft (8 m) in 45 minutes, surging an estimated 29 ft (8.8 m) in the Hunt area, where more than 20 children were declared missing from a summer camp. July 5 saw more flash flood warnings for Burnet, Williamson, and Travis counties, including Lake Travis, which is part of the Colorado River watershed, and the lower San Gabriel River (Texas). The worst affected area in NW Travis County was the Sandy Creek neighborhood, which saw devastating damage in the wake of the floods. A total of 9 people died in Travis County, 3 in Williamson County, and 5 in Burnet County. In the span of a few hours, the equivalent of four months worth of rain fell across the Texas Hill Country region, with the highest rain totals being 20.33 in (516 mm). The flood was the deadliest inland flooding event in the United States since the 1976 Big Thompson River flood, surpassing flooding from Hurricane Helene in 2024.

On July 12, the Weather Prediction Center declared a moderate risk for the same area in Central Texas, with the potential for significant to major flash flooding. Throughout the overnight hours of July 12 into the next day, several flash flood warnings were issued, including a flash flood emergency for San Saba County. The resulting additional rainfall caused the Lampasas River to rise over 30 ft (9.1 m).

After the disaster, Texas governor Greg Abbott signed a disaster declaration for several counties in Central Texas, and U.S. president Donald Trump signed a federal disaster declaration for Kerr County. Over 2,000 volunteers arrived in Kerr County to help with the search and rescue. Numerous firefighter and search and rescue teams from around the U.S. scoured the Guadalupe River for survivors and victims. Various organizations responded to the area with food, equipment and manpower.

Kerr County did not have a dedicated flood warning system, despite prior proposals from local officials citing the area's high flood risk. For National Flood Insurance Program purposes administered by the Federal Emergency Management Agency (FEMA), the floodplain or special flood hazard area is defined as the area that would be flooded by a base flood which "has a one percent chance of being equaled or exceeded in any given year", also known as a 100-year flood. The 2011 Kerr County flood insurance rate map showed Camp Mystic, a Christian girls' summer camp, as being in a special flood hazard area. Following various appeals from the camp, several buildings were removed from the hazard area, as the camp continued to operate and expanded in and around the flood plain.

== Meteorological synopsis and background ==
Late on July 3, 2025, a broader mid-level trough was situated over the southwestern U.S. already containing tropical east Pacific remnant moisture. This system developed into thunderstorms which stalled over Central Texas, causing heavy rains that led to deadly flooding in that region on July 4–7, especially along the Guadalupe River. Altogether, four months' worth of rain fell, causing the Guadalupe River to rise about 26 ft (8 m) in 45 minutes.

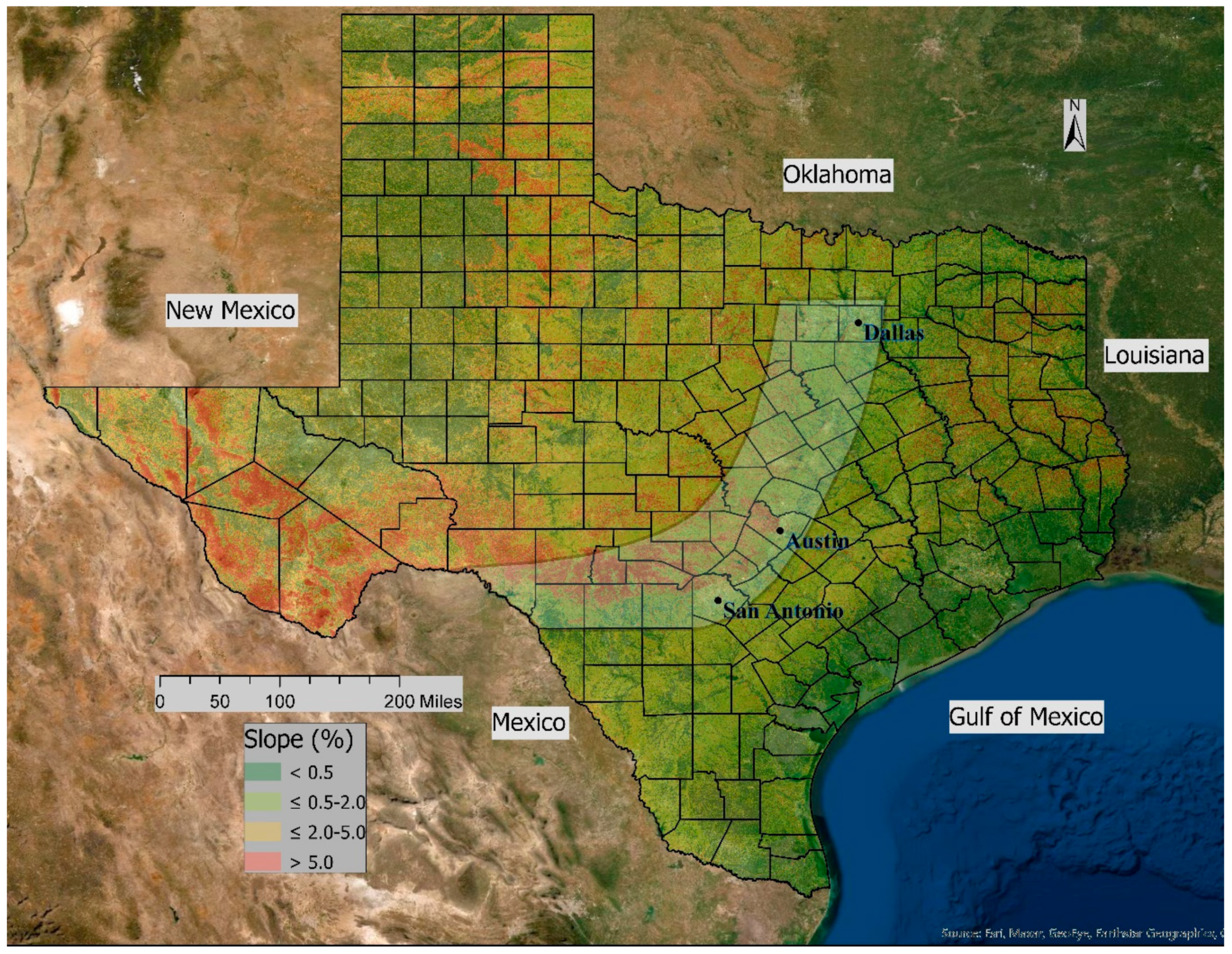
Area of "Flash Flood Alley" in Texas; the lighter curved region running from Dallas down through San Antonio

Central Texas, specifically the Hill Country region, is prone to major floods. Due to the heightened risk for flash flooding, the area is referred to as Flash Flood Alley. The ground in this part of Texas is predominantly limestone, covered by a shallow layer of soil, and hill slopes are steep. Consequently, rainwater tends to run off quickly, funneling into rivers during rainstorms, which occur when warm moist air from the Gulf, pushed up over the Balcones Escarpment, condenses and dumps water. With climate change, the warming atmosphere holds more water, increasing downpours and flood risk. The Guadalupe River and several surrounding rivers in the region have flooded multiple times in recent decades, often with deadly consequences. This includes flooding in July 1987 at Comfort when 10 teenagers drowned during evacuations from a church camp, flooding in October 1998 that killed 31, flooding in May 2015 on the nearby Blanco River that killed 13, and flooding on June 12, just three weeks before this flood, in nearby San Antonio that killed 13. Texas has led the U.S. in flood deaths over the past several decades; from 1959 to 2019, 1,069 people died in flooding statewide during that 60-year period (Louisiana was second highest, with 693).

=== Camp Mystic ===
Camp Mystic, along the banks of the Guadalupe River in Kerr County, had at least eight buildings, including multiple cabins, that were within a Federal Emergency Management Agency (FEMA) designated floodway, the portion of the floodplain adjacent to the stream channel most susceptible to swift moving flood waters. In 2011 FEMA placed the camp in a "special flood hazard area", requiring flood insurance and stricter regulation on any future construction projects. The designation indicated the area would likely be inundated by a 100-year flood. Between 2011 and 2020, FEMA redrew the 100-year flood map several times following various appeals from the camp, removing 55 buildings from the official flood hazard area, as the camp continued to operate and expanded in and around the potentially dangerous flood plain.

== Preparations ==
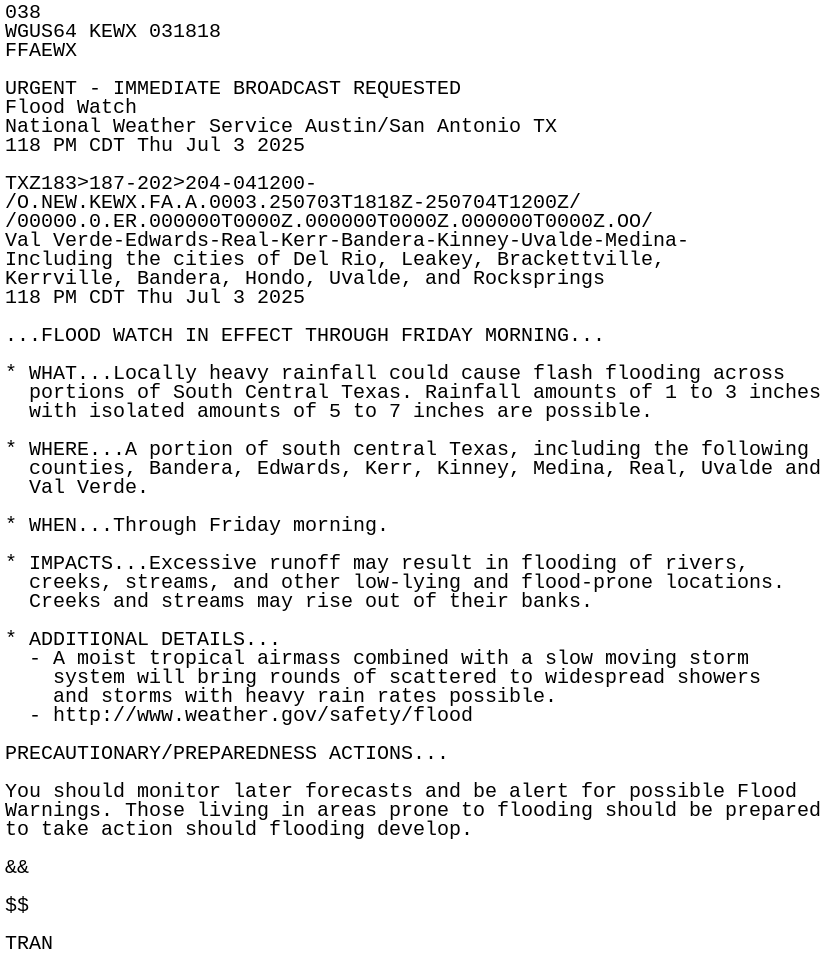
A flood watch issued by the National Weather Service hours before flooding began

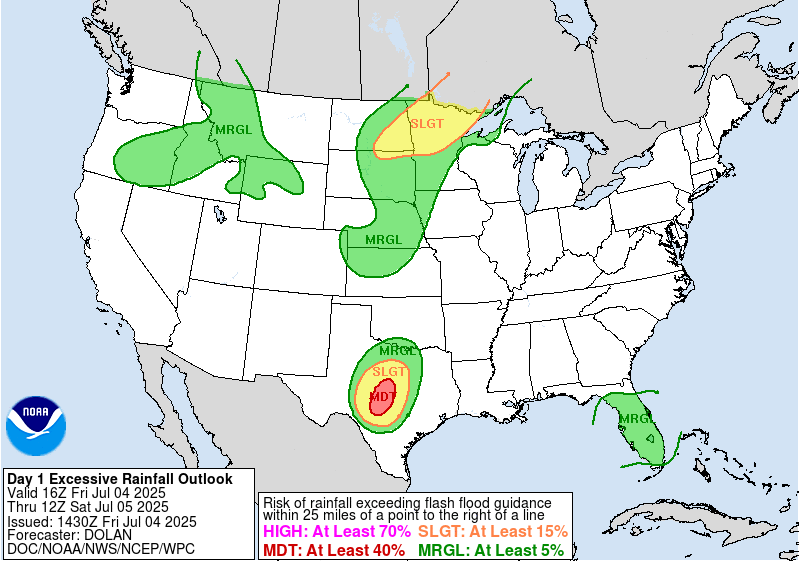
"Moderate" risk of excessive rainfall outlined by the Weather Prediction Center at 1430Z on July 4

On July 2, the Texas Division of Emergency Management (TDEM) "activated state emergency response resources in anticipation of increased threats of flooding in parts of West and Central Texas heading into the holiday weekend," stating that the National Weather Service (NWS) anticipated heavy rainfall beginning that evening, with the potential to cause flash flooding across West Texas and the Hill Country, lasting a few days. TDEM listed state resources available to support local flood response operations.

At 1:18 pm CDT on July 3, 2025, the NWS issued a Flood Watch for Kerr County and other areas that would later be impacted by severe flooding. The watch warned of 1–3 in (25–76 mm) of rain, with isolated areas seeing closer to 5–7 in (130–180 mm). The watch noted that there would be "rounds of scattered to widespread showers and storms with heavy rain rates possible."

On July 3 at 6:10 pm CDT, the Weather Prediction Center issued a Mesoscale Precipitation Discussion citing that "areas of flash flooding will be likely across central TX overnight with very heavy rainfall expected. Hourly rainfall in excess of 2 to 3 inches (51–76 mm) seems reasonable given the environment and localized 6-hr totals over 6 inches (150 mm) will be possible", and detailing that the potential flooding may have "significant impacts". Another discussion issued at 6:27 am on July 4 used stronger wording, warning that "Considerable to catastrophic flash flood impacts can continue to be expected."

Numerous flash flood warnings were issued throughout the event. Several of these warnings contained dire flash flood emergency wording. The first flash flood warning was issued at 11:41 pm CDT on July 3, and was for Bandera County. At 1:14 am CDT on July 4, the first flash flood warning with a "considerable" tag was issued for parts of Bandera and Kerr counties; this tag automatically triggers cell phone Wireless Emergency Alerts. A flash flood emergency was issued at 4:03 am CDT on July 4, urging residents of Hunt and Ingram, in Kerr County, to "seek higher ground now!" and that rainfall rates of 2–4 in (50–100 mm) per hour would continue to impact the area which had already seen 4–10 in (100–250 mm) of rain.

GOES-19 Infrared imagery of the storm system on July 4

Further down the Guadalupe River, a flash flood emergency was issued by the National Weather Service for Kerrville and Center Point at 5:34 am CDT, again warning of the potential for "catastrophic" flood damage, and noting that "automated rain gauges indicate a large and deadly flood wave is moving down the Guadalupe River. Flash flooding is already occurring". Another flash flood emergency was issued for Comfort two hours later at 10:45. The area was placed under a flash flood emergency at 7:24 am, warning that "automated rain gauges indicate a large and deadly flood wave is moving down the Guadalupe River" over an hour before the water level began to surge. In total, the NWS issued 22 alerts of escalating severity for the area in and around Kerr County over the course of July 3 and 4, according to CBS News. There were also several other weather service messages issued for Western and Central Texas on July 2 and 3, concerning the risk of flooding. No alerts were issued, however, by local government officials in Kerr or Bandera Counties, who were reliant on NWS alerts.

On July 7, another "moderate" risk for excessive rainfall was outlined by the Weather Prediction Center; A flash flood watch was issued for much of central Texas at 11:46 pm CDT on July 6, warning of 2–4 in (51–102 mm) of rain with some areas possibly seeing as much as 10 in (250 mm) through 7 pm on July 7.

After a lull in flood activity, a new flash flood emergency was issued on July 13, for the Colorado Bend State Park, noting that "Doppler radar indicated thunderstorms producing heavy rain across the warned area". Numerous Flash Flood Warnings were also issued.

== Effects ==
Texas Hill Country Flood. 1. Hunt, 2. Camp Mystic

In the early morning of July 4, 6.5 in (170 mm) of rain fell in just three hours, resulting in numerous water-related rescues. In Hunt, where the two branches of the Guadalupe River meet, the river gauge recorded a 26 ft (7.9 m) rise just 45 minutes before failing when it reached 29 ft (8.8 m); it ultimately crested at 37.52 ft (11.44 m). By 4:05 am, the Guadalupe River at Hunt had risen to 21.99 ft (6.70 m), rising over ten ft (3.0 m) in an hour and reaching major flood stage. The river continued to surge, reaching 37.52 ft (11.44 m) and still rising at 5:10 am when the gauge at Hunt stopped updating. This level marked the highest ever recorded at Hunt, surpassing flash flooding that occurred in 1987 by almost 12 in (300 mm).

Downstream, the river surge measured 21 ft (6.4 m) in one hour at Kerrville, and nearly 27 ft (8.2 m) in 45 minutes at Comfort. The river's rise was so swift, that people did not have time to react. The city of Kerrville issued a disaster declaration on July 4 following the floods. In total, 5–11 in (130–280 mm) of rain fell on some areas that experienced significant flood effects. San Angelo, in Tom Green County, recorded 15 in (381 mm) of rainfall on July 4. There, flooding of the Concho River compromised the city's wastewater system, causing two discharges—1.6 million US gal (6.1 million L) and 67,000 US gal (250,000 L)—into the river.

Local officials there estimated that over 12,100 structures were affected by the flooding. Flooding continued into July 5 with two more flash flood emergencies issued for areas around Lake Travis north of Austin. Later, a third flash flood emergency was issued for central Comal County, noting that "local law enforcement reported flooding of the Guadalupe River". About 20.33 in (516 mm) of rain fell northwest of Streeter near Mason. Early on July 13, torrential rain caused the Lampasas River to quickly rise over 30 ft (9 m) in 5 hours. A crest of 32.45 ft (9.89 m) (just under major flood stage) was recorded that morning near Kempner.

=== Search and rescue ===
Footage of a United States Coast Guard rescue mission in Kerr County on July 4

Search and rescue operations commenced on July 4, resulting in at least 237 people being rescued from floodwaters by the end of the day, including 167 people rescued from trees and roofs via helicopter. Telecommunication outages in the area made it hard to contact many people in the region, and the amount of debris and destruction complicated the work of first responders. On July 8, the Texas Parks and Wildlife Department said that more than 440 people had been rescued, and least 120 bodies had been recovered, while authorities had searched 26 mi (42 km) of river. Over 2,000 volunteers helped out in the emergency operations in Kerr County alone. According to officials, the last "live rescue" was made on July 4. Multiple groups from at least 12 other U.S. states and agencies, as well as from Mexico, joined the search and rescue. Firefighters and first responders from Acuña, Coahuila, deployed on July 9 to assist in the operations along the Guadalupe River. California governor Gavin Newsom sent urban search and rescue team members to the Texas floods.

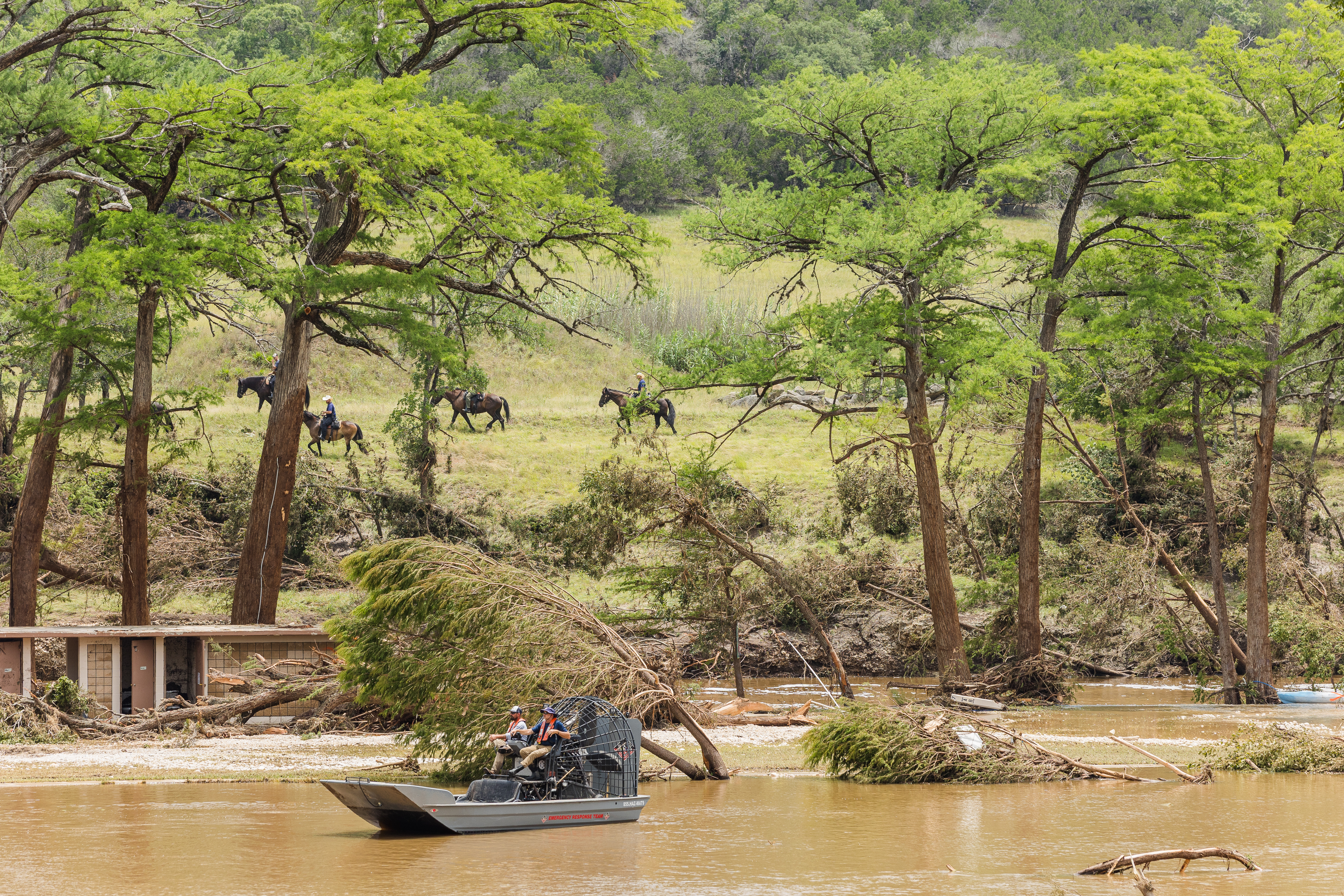
Damage in Kerrville on July 7

Twenty-two Arkansas National Guardsmen, including pilots, crew chiefs, and maintenance personnel, were deployed to assist with transportation of search and rescue personnel during the early morning hours of July 8, after receiving an Emergency Management Assistance Compact request from Texas. On the same day, Colorado Task Force One was activated in response to the floods; the team consisted of 48 members, including four canines, spanning 16 different agencies and five affiliate member agencies. South Metro Fire Rescue sent ten members, Poudre Fire Authority sent six members, and Colorado Springs Fire Department five members. On July 7, the governor of Louisiana, Jeff Landry, dispatched 14 Swift Water Rescue personnel to Texas to assist in the flood response. On July 9, NASA deployed two aircraft to assist state and local authorities in the recovery operation. The planes are a part of NASA's Disasters Response Coordination System, which was activated to support emergency responses and was working closely with Texas Division of Emergency Management, FEMA, and two charities: Save the Children and GiveDirectly.

North Dakota's governor Kelly Armstrong authorized the North Dakota National Guard to send a MQ-9 Reaper drone to help locate survivors under the request from Emergency Management Assistance Compact. Remote controlled from Fargo, North Dakota by the North Dakota Air National Guard's 119th Wing, the MQ-9 Reaper is being used to collect aerial surveillance, search for the missing, and assess damage in inaccessible areas. On July 11, Ohio Task Force One was requested to assist with search and rescue operations in Texas after receiving an activation order from the FEMA Urban Search and Rescue System for a Canine Mission Ready Package. Three team members, alongside two K-9s, were sent to assist in the operation and search for missing people. Ohio's governor Mike DeWine also activated the Ohio State Highway Patrol Mobile Field Force after calling Abbott to offer his support to the victims. A team from the Ohio Department of Natural Resources was also sent to Texas to help with recovery efforts. Dozens of active and former Navy SEALS volunteered to assist with the search and recovery efforts, with more than 30 joining in the operations.

Minnesota's governor Tim Walz sent out K9 units from Minnesota Task Force one to aid in the search and recovery operations in central Texas. Arizona Task Force One deployed a team of 49 to Texas, the team including live-find dogs, medical personnel, structural engineers and technical rescue specialists. The team also brought vehicles and boats, including boats that can gain access to inaccessible areas. Structural collapse gear, hazardous materials equipment and communications tools were also deployed. Eight members from the Swiftwater Rescue Team, a part of the Virginia Beach Fire Department, were sent to central Texas to assist in the search and rescue efforts, with the first responders being send out to July 6. Nevada Task Force One was sent to assist in the recovery efforts, with a team of 47, including responders from several fire department in Nevada, along with four K9 units.

On July 8, FEMA activated Indiana Task Force One and deployed a team of 49 to central Texas to aid and assist with the local authorities after the floods. Several days later on July 13, Indiana Task Force One received more orders to deploy 35 extra members. The next day, the additional 35 emergency responders arrived in Kerr County to assist in the search and recovery efforts. On July 11, the Wisconsin Task Force One arrived in central Texas, the team's trailers were packed with gear, boats, and other equipment. The Swiftwater team, consisting of 16 members, will be assisted with searching those missing from the floods, with deployment planning to last 14 days, depending on if Texas still needed help after 14 days. On July 5, Oklahoma's governor Kevin Stitt, and Oklahoma Department of Emergency Management send out two Type III swift water rescue teams to Texas to assist in the flood response, with teams including members from Oklahoma Task Force One, along with three trained recovery K9s, boats, trailers, and equipment as request from the Texas Division of Emergency Management through the Emergency Management Assistance Compact. On July 9, the team relocated their search efforts from the Marble Falls area to the Kerrville area. Kansas Governor Laura Kelly deployed Kansas Task Force One arrived in central Texas on July 12 to assist in the rescue operations. The team consisting of two Type 3 swift-water search and rescue teams.

Members from Florida Urban Search and Rescue Task Force 8 were deployed to Texas on July 7, responding and assisting with the emergency operations. The crew began their search and rescue efforts in Kerr County before stationing in Travis County as a Quick Reaction Force. South Carolina's governor, Henry McMaster, approved the deployment of South Carolina Task Force One to Texas to assist with the emergency response on July 8, with team including five personnel and two cadaver K-9s.

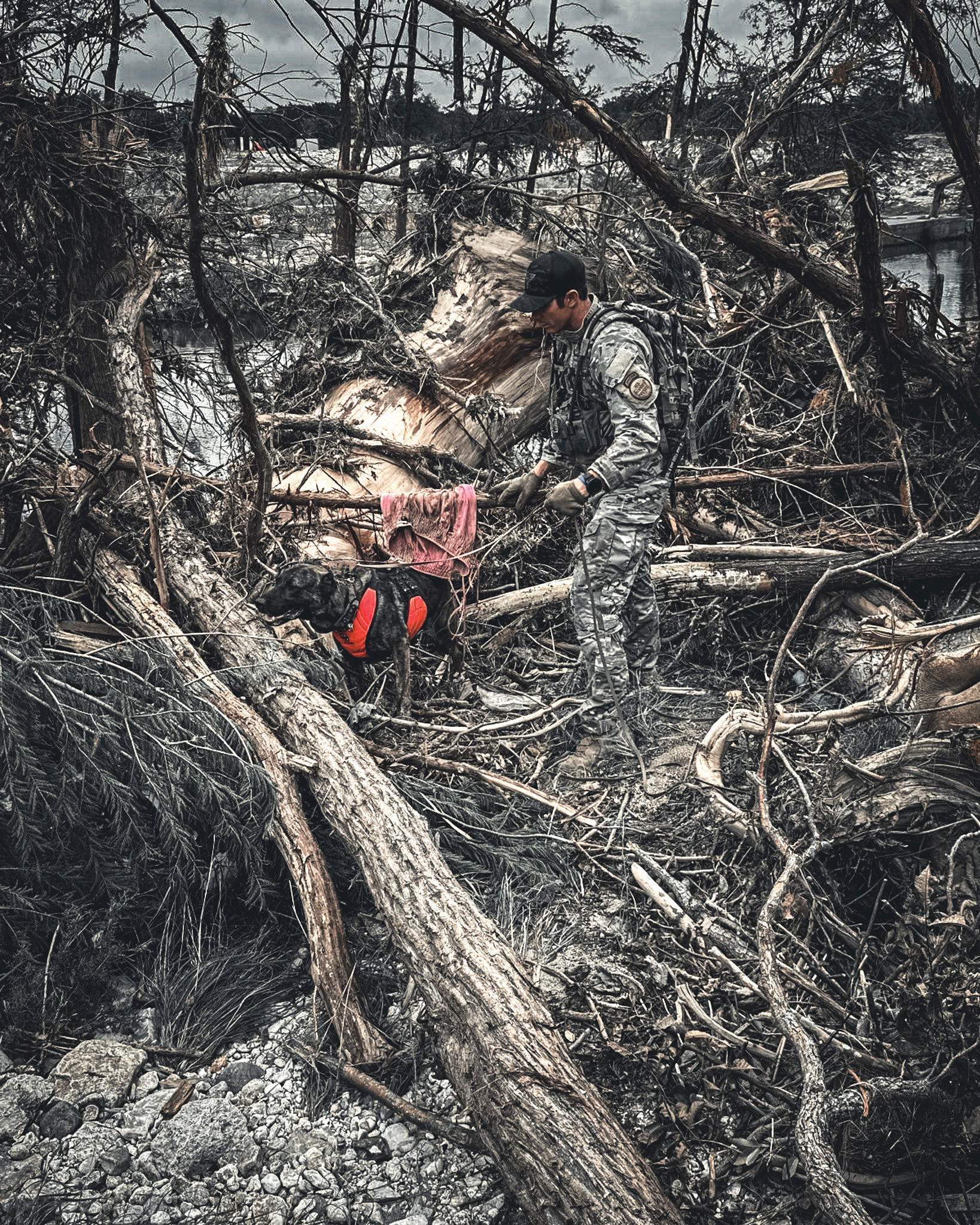
Search-and-rescue operations along the Guadalupe River on July 15

On July 13, several search and rescue operations were conducted in multiple counties, including Lampasas, San Saba, and Schleicher, as the Lampasas River rose over 30 ft (9.1 m), with Texas Task Force One and Texas Parks & Wildlife making water rescues along the river. Officials urged untrained civilians to stay away from active search zones because of safety risks and coordination challenges. They also criticized the influx of sightseers and the use of unauthorized drones for complicating rescue operations. On July 7, reports were made of a private drone illegally flown into temporarily restricted airspace over Kerrville and which had crashed into a rescue helicopter, forcing the pilot to make an emergency landing, and damaging and rendering unusable a critical piece of emergency response equipment. Subsequent clarification from the City of Kerrville revealed the drone was actually an authorized search and rescue drone which had flown too high and collided with the rescue helicopter. On July 13, search operations were suspended due to renewed threats of major flash flooding.

=== Timeline ===
July 3

- The National Weather Service forecasts heavy rain across Central Texas.

July 4

- First flash flood warning issued at 1:14 A.M. CDT for Kerr County. Torrential rainfall of 2–3 in (51–76 mm) per hour, triggering catastrophic flash flooding in the Texas Hill Country, particularly along the Guadalupe River in Kerr County. 5.22 inches (132.59 mm) of rain per hour fell on the Guadalupe River.
- The Guadalupe River rises rapidly, over 26 ft in 45 minutes, cresting at 37.52 ft by around 5 am, a record high.
- Numerous Flash Flood Emergencies are declared for Kerr, Bandera, and Comal counties. Rainfall totals exceed 20 in (510 mm) in parts of the watershed.
- Summer camps are devastated — Camp Mystic, hosting 750 girls, gets hit. At least 27 campers and counselors reported as deceased, including director Dick Eastland.
- Initial fatalities reported at 24, with 23–25 missing.

July 5

- Continued flash flooding in areas such as Lake Travis and Comal County (Colorado River watershed).
- Death toll rises to 50; more than 29 people are reported to be missing.

July 6

- Criticism arises over slow or ineffective flood-alert systems in Kerr County.
- Death toll rises to 81; 41 are reported to be missing.

July 7

- Drones and national guard units from multiple states were deployed.
- Kerr County's lack of sirens and independent alerts are scrutinized.
- Death toll rises to 104; officially, 24 people are listed as missing

July 8

- Over 440 people rescued. Aid arrives from Louisiana, Colorado, Ohio, Minnesota, Mexico, and NASA.
- Death toll increases to 111; the number people missing increases to over 172

July 9

- Additional multi-state rescue and drone teams deployed.
- Death toll stands at 120; more than 160 are still missing.

July 10

- The Texas Division of Emergency Management, FEMA and U.S. Small Business Administration staff opened a Disaster Recovery Center in Kerrville.
- Death toll reaches 129, with more than 170 still reported as missing.

July 11

- U.S. Coast Guard and Ohio Task Force One continue search efforts.
- President Donald Trump toured disaster sites nears the Guadalupe River in Kerrville, and also met with state and local officials.
- Death toll at 129, with over 160 reported missing.

July 13

- Heavy rains in the region caused new flooding, necessitating new rescues and evacuations. Search and recovery efforts temporarily suspended along the Guadeloupe River.
- Death toll rises to 132, with over 160 people missing.

July 19

- Death toll stands at 135, with 7 people listed as missing.

July 29

- A Kendall County official reports that no residents of the county had died in the flood, and that the nine bodies recovered there had died upstream in Kerr County. Two persons remain missing.

== Casualties ==
County	Deaths
Kerr County	117
Travis County	10
Burnet County	5
Williamson County	3
Tom Green County	1
Total:	136

Altogether, at least 136 people have been confirmed dead in the floods: 117 in Kerr County, 10 in Travis County, 5 in Burnet County, 3 in Williamson County, and 1 in Tom Green County. Three people remain missing. Approximately a quarter of the fatalities in Kerr County were young girls who were staying at Camp Mystic, an all-girls Christian summer camp located 6 mi (10 km) southwest of Hunt. On July 4, 27 were declared missing from Camp Mystic. The number of girls missing dropped to 10 on July 7 with a camp counselor missing. Camp Mystic director Dick Eastland, who purchased the camp in 1974, was confirmed to be among those dead. On July 7, CNN reported that 27 campers and counselors had died in floods at Camp Mystic and that ten girls and a counselor were still missing. By July 9, five girls and one counselor remained missing.

Other places that were hard hit were HTR TX Hill Country Campground and adjacent Blue Oak RV Park in Kerrville and the Casa Bonita community between Hunt and Camp Mystic.

On July 14, the number of people missing was lowered from 161 to 101, the decrease was attributed to victims being recovered, some of the missing victims making contact and found safe, and some missing reports being falsified. In Travis County specifically, the number missing dropped from ten to four after it was discovered some people appeared both on the list of people missing and people confirmed dead. As of September 24, the number missing stood at two.

== Aftermath ==
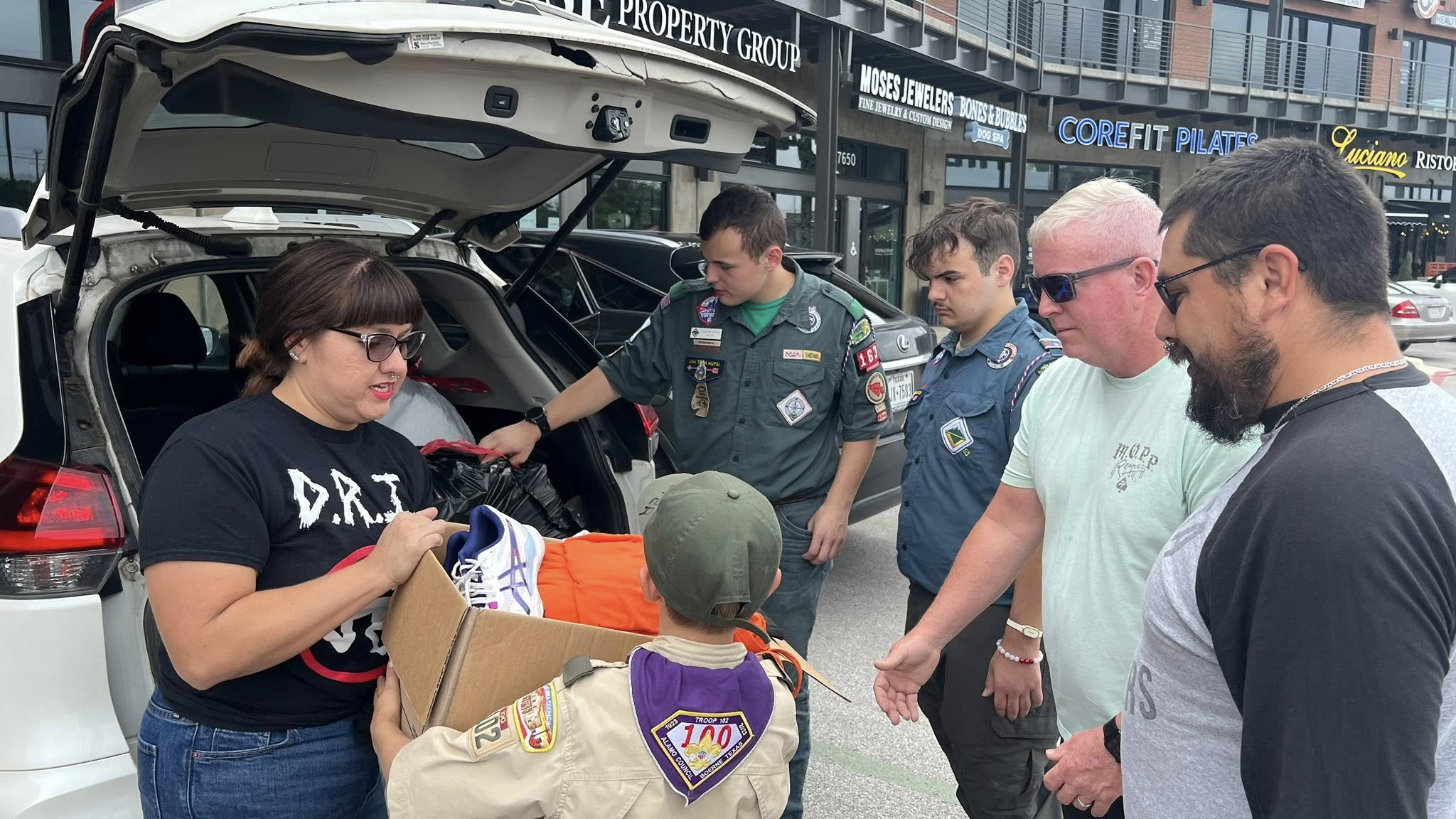
Scouts help unload donated supplies for Red Cross distribution in Boerne, Texas.

The grocery chain H-E-B deployed its mobile kitchens and disaster relief trucks, committing a $5 million donation to aid and recovery. All Hands and Hearts partnered with Airbnb to support first responders, search and rescue teams, and families who survived the floods, with Airbnb providing emergency temporary housing for first responders, people looking for missing loved ones wanting to stay near search and rescue efforts, and residents with heavily damaged or destroyed homes, working with local nonprofits to identify those in greatest need. Additionally, Samaritan's Purse sent a disaster relief unit to central Texas, equipped with tools and relief supplies, and prepared to assist impacted families. T-Mobile donated $500,000 to support relief efforts in Kerr County to the Community Foundation of the Texas Hill Country. Walmart, its foundation, and Sam's Club partnered up to support communities in South and Central Texas after the floods. These three companies and organization committed up to $500,000 in grants and donations, including up to $250,000 match of customer and member donations through online or in-stores or clubs in Texas. Walmart and their charity foundation will also fund local partners like the American Red Cross and The Salvation Army with food, water, and other supplies for the relief efforts.

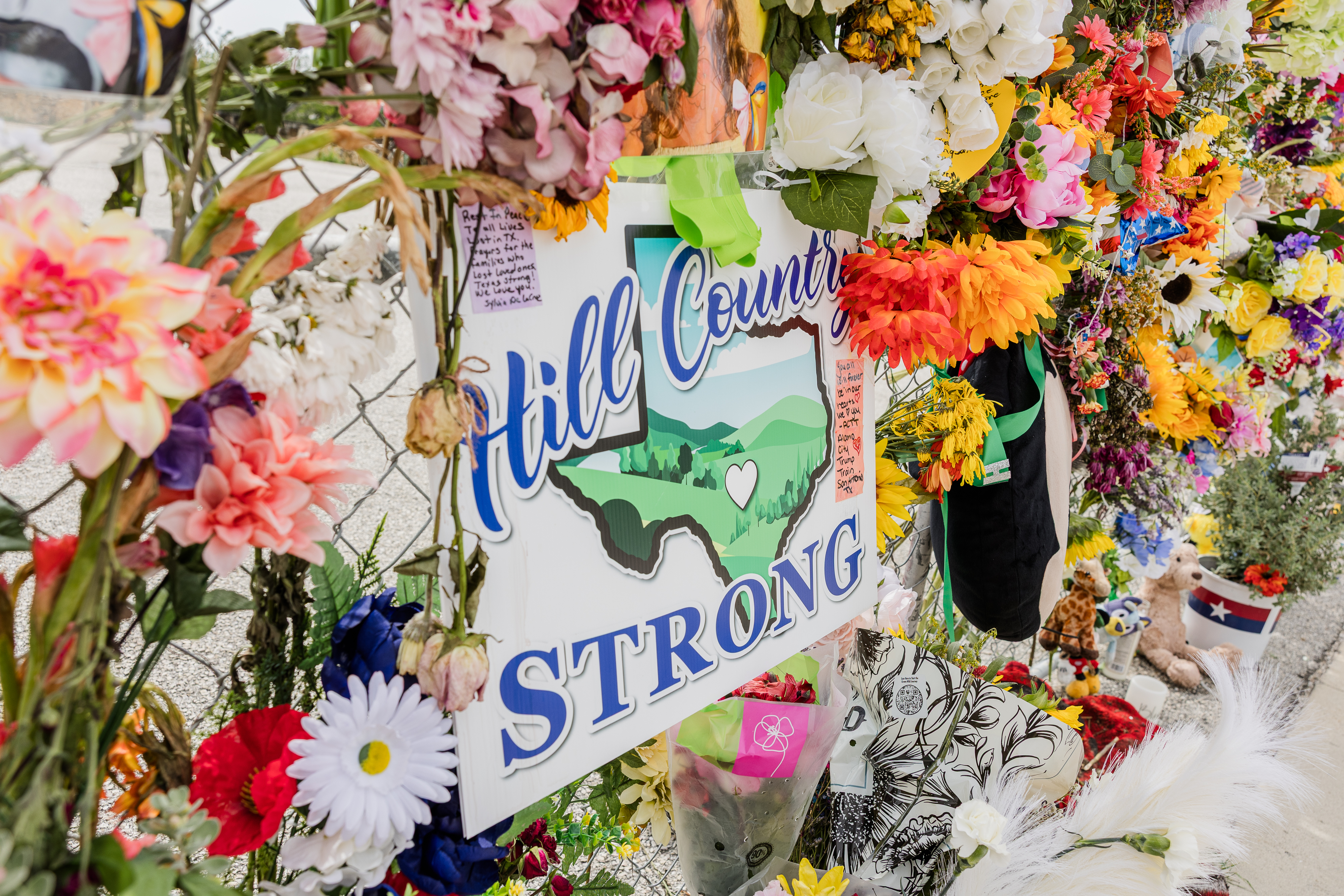
River of Angels Memorial Wall along Water Street in Kerrville, Texas

Amazon donated over 68,000 essential supplies to communities in central Texas, including gift cards, diapers, snacks, hygiene kits, and cleaning supplies. Amazon also served as technology advisor and shared equipment to help search and rescue teams map their positions, assess hazards, and coordinate resources. On Water Street in Kerrville, a large makeshift memorial was erected on a chain-link fence separating the Guadalupe River from downtown Kerrville. The fence quickly became filled with photographs of persons who were killed, flowers, and signs. On the evening of July 11, 300 people showed up at the memorial for a vigil with speakers including faith leaders, and survivors recounting their stories. NBA teams Houston Rockets, Dallas Mavericks, and San Antonio Spurs partnered together to support flood relief efforts by selling t-shirts bearing the slogan "Texas Strong". It was announced that all proceeds from the sales would go to the Texas Sport for Healing Fund to support those impacted by the floods. And, in Boerne, Texas, the owner of a sign making business created "Hill Country strong" signs to raise funds the Community Foundation of the Texas Hill Country. In total, The community foundation had raised $30 million for flood relief as of July 12. Fast food restaurant P. Terry's donated $150,000 after pledging to give 100 percent of its profits on July 10, 2025.

== Political response ==
External videos
- "Governor Abbott and Other Officials Hold News Conference on Texas Floods", July 6, 2025, C-SPAN
- "Gov. Abbott and Others News Conference on Texas Floods", July 8, 2025, C-SPAN

At a press conference on the evening of July 4, Texas lieutenant governor Dan Patrick said that he was working in coordination with the state's emergency response team on the "significant" and "catastrophic" flooding in Kerr County. On that day, Governor Greg Abbott signed a state disaster declaration for several counties in Central Texas. On July 5, Abbott expanded the disaster declaration to additional counties affected by storms and toured the damage from the flooding in Kerrville, with local, state, and federal officials including Secretary of Homeland Security Kristi Noem. Abbott also announced that day that Trump had signed a federal disaster declaration for Kerr County, with other counties planned to be added later. Patrick also formed the Select Committees on Disaster Preparedness and Flooding, a joint committee with members from both the Texas House and Senate to discuss flood response.

In response to Abbott's July 4 disaster declaration and request for federal support, Trump issued a federal disaster declaration on July 6. States petition the federal government for emergency assistance when "the necessary response to a disaster is beyond the capacity of state and local governments".

After the floods, Indiana governor Mike Braun said how his state must reassess how it communicates emergency warnings and coordinates disaster response, and how the Texas floods should be a wake-up call for Indiana and other states to examine whether their emergency response systems have any weaknesses, with the governor stating, "We have our own calamities, through tornadoes and flooding — thank goodness, nothing of that magnitude — but we all need to be prepared. I think it's a time to learn from it and see what we can do better, collectively."

== Analysis and criticism ==
=== Influence of climate change ===
The 2021 IPCC report on The Physical Science Basis stated that climate change was increasing the frequency and intensity of extreme heavy rainfall events and flash floods, with the rarer extreme events becoming more frequent. Natural variability also plays a part, and during the spring of 2024, the phase of the El Niño–Southern Oscillation was linked to enhanced severe weather outbreaks in the region.

On July 7, Faranda (Research Director in Climate Physics, LSCE), Ginesta (Oxford Smith School), and Alberti (INGV), published a report, on Zenodo. They described the flood on July 4, its meteorological conditions, and its background with reference to the 2021 IPCC report. Comparing present regional conditions (1987–2023) to the past (1950–1986), their analysis concluded that meteorological conditions leading to the July 2025 floods in Texas were up to 7% wetter compared to similar past events; "Natural variability alone cannot explain the changes in precipitation associated with this very exceptional meteorological condition."

Climate scientist Andrew Dessler, at Texas A&M University, said careful attribution studies will be needed to measure exactly how much this event had been affected by extra energy in the climate system due to increasing carbon in the atmosphere, but "every weather event we see now carries some influence from climate change. The only question is how big that influence is." Jennifer Francis of the Woodwell Climate Research Center said there was "a clear signal and fingerprint of climate change in this type of event".

=== Accuracy and communication of forecasts ===
Effects of federal government cost-cutting on the National Weather Service (NWS) were questioned, White House spokesperson Abigail Jackson said "the National Weather Service was well staffed and did their job to provide warnings to those impacted". Texas Division of Emergency Management Chief Nim Kidd criticized the forecasts from the NWS, stating that "the amount of rain that fell in this specific location was never in any of those forecasts. ... It did not predict the amount of rain that we saw". Trump told reporters that the funding cuts had not left key NWS posts vacant, and it had been "a hundred year catastrophe". Asked if meteorologists should be rehired, Trump said, "I would think not. This was the thing that happened in seconds. Nobody expected it. Nobody saw it. Very talented people in there and they didn't see it."

The New York Times reported that the NWS office in San Angelo had several vacancies, including the branch's meteorologist-in-charge, and that the San Antonio office did not have a warning coordination meteorologist after the individual previously in that role took an early retirement as part of the federal workforce reductions. According to Tom Fahy, the legislative director for the National Weather Service Employees Organization, the vacancy rates at both offices had "roughly doubled" since Trump's inauguration in January. NOAA had announced its intention to advertise "a targeted number of permanent, mission-critical field positions", a Commerce Department spokesman said the “National Hurricane Center is fully staffed to meet this season’s demand, and any recruitment efforts are simply meant to deepen our talent pool". Despite staff being laid off or taking early retirement, five forecasters came on duty that night, the usual number when severe weather is expected. The union said "in both San Angelo and San Antonio offices, we had an adequate amount of staff to get out the alerts and warnings to the public".

=== Effectiveness of evacuation alerts ===
Camp Mystic owner Dick Eastland proposed an automatic flood alert system after the 1987 flood, which was eventually installed. The system was managed by a third-party contractor who went out of business in 1998. Citing unreliability and the possibility of false signals, the river authority decommissioned the system in 1999. Two days before the floods, an inspector reported the camp had a written plan to respond to natural disasters, with volunteers and camp employees being notified of these plans during training sessions.

Focus has also fallen on the lack of an independent warning system and the lack of evacuation orders in Kerr County. It relied on cellphone emergency alerts, which may not work in rural areas with poor service, at night, when phones are off, or when there are no phones around: the Camp Mystic girls were not allowed to bring them. Also, people tend to ignore repeated phone alerts. Areas that did have a warning system in place, such as Comfort, had no casualties. Comfort has a computer-backed system costing about $60,000 that is linked to the National Weather Service by a satellite dish that can withstand violent weather; the system can be set to automatically trigger sirens when the agency declares flash flood emergencies for the area, but Comfort opts to trigger its sirens manually, when officials notice flood waters have risen past a certain point.

In Comfort, adjacent to the Guadalupe River in Kendall County, residents were alerted to the flooding by a firehouse siren connected it to a U.S. Geological Survey sensor at Cypress Creek. Comal County, along with the Comal Water-Oriented Recreation District, Guadalupe County, and New Braunfels city government, funded an expanded flood siren system, which it completed in 2015. In 2016, the then-sheriff of Kerr County advocated for a warning system, including sirens, but other people did not want the disturbance of sirens going off accidentally, and then-Commissioner H.A. "Buster" Baldwin said, "I think this whole thing is a little extravagant for Kerr County, with sirens and such." A county commissioner noted that year that Kerr County was "probably the highest risk area in the state for flooding". Discussions about funding and constructing a system continued on and off until at least 2021. Kerr County Judge Rob Kelly said that the lack of a warning system was due to its high cost and claimed that residents were resistant to the idea for that reason.

Kerr County twice requested government grants in 2017 and 2018 from the Texas Division of Emergency Management for additional measuring equipment, upgrades to existing water gauge systems, and software / website for real-time information for the public. These requests were not approved by the Texas Division of Emergency Management, which oversees FEMA funding disbursements. While additional funding was made available for the county through the American Rescue Plan Act of 2021, it was not used for flood warning and monitoring systems. At the time, several residents voiced their opposition to using the funds, giving a variety of reasons, including fears that the money would come with undesirable federal government mandates attached, particularly COVID vaccination and masking requirements. It is unclear whether county officials were aware they could have used the funding for such upgrades.

Kerr County is one area with a CodeRED mass notification system, which can send emergency alerts to the phones of residents who have signed up in advance. At 4:22 am CDT, a firefighter from Ingram spoke to a Sheriff's Office dispatcher, "The Guadalupe Schumacher sign is underwater on State Highway 39. Is there any way we can send a CodeRED out to our Hunt residents, asking them to find higher ground or stay home?" The dispatcher said they had to "get that approved with our supervisor", the first alert on the system did not go out until 90 minutes later, and some messages took nearly six hours, arriving at 10 am CDT. Kerr County Sheriff Larry Leitha declined to answer a question about the delayed emergency alerts, saying that an after-action review would follow the search and rescue efforts. Later, it was reported that Dick Eastland, Camp Mystic leader, received the flash flood warning 1:14 am, but took until 2:30 am, over an hour later, to begin evacuations. By then, the river was already rising rapidly.

=== FEMA response times ===
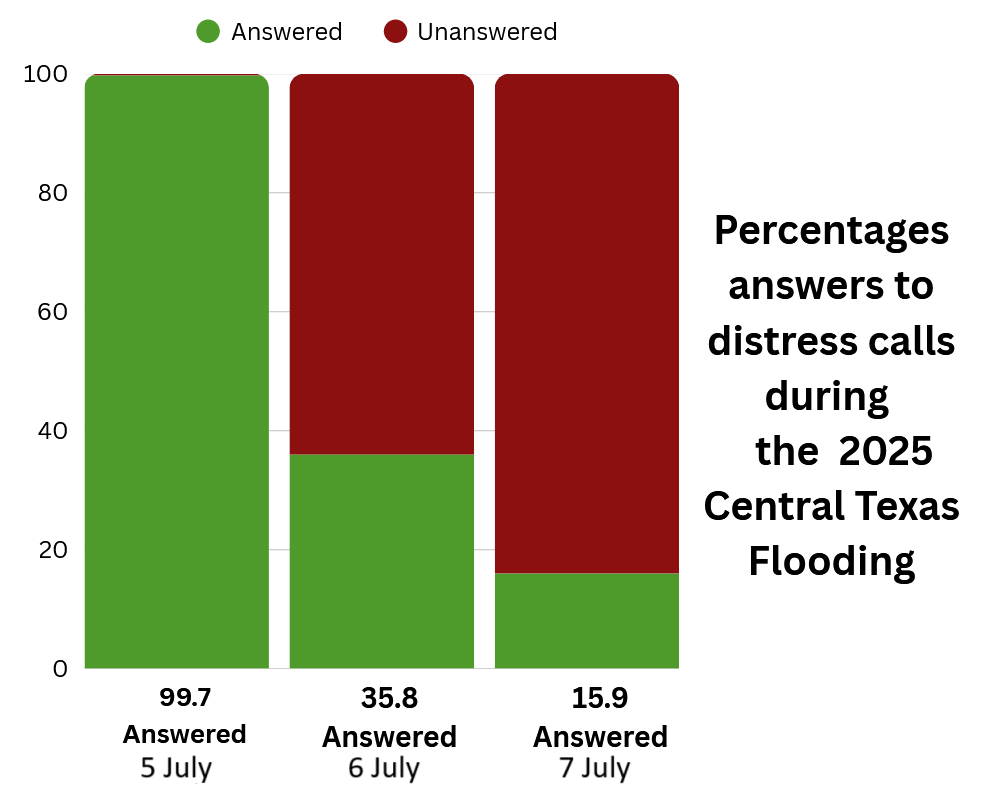
Percentages of FEMA distress answers during the floods

CNN reported that Secretary of Homeland Security Kristi Noem implemented a policy by which every contract and grant over $100,000 now requires her personal sign-off before any funds can be released: "For FEMA, where disaster response costs routinely soar into the billions as the agency contracts with on-the-ground crews, officials say that threshold is essentially 'pennies', requiring sign-off for relatively small expenditures." The policy also meant that, in the face of the incoming flood, FEMA officials couldn't pre-position Urban Search and Rescue crews from the teams stationed regionally across the country, as they needed Noem's approval before sending those additional assets. "Noem didn't authorize FEMA's deployment of Urban Search and Rescue teams until Monday, more than 72 hours after the flooding began, multiple sources told CNN". CNN and others also reported that during the floods, many emergency calls to FEMA were not answered due to a lack of personnel, as Noem had not renewed the contracts with the four call centers fielding most of the calls. The call centers also help survivors access various kinds of assistance, including an emergency $750 payment for immediate needs, such as food. Democrats on the House Committee on Oversight and Government Reform wrote that it took her until July 7 to approve the deployment of FEMA's search-and-rescue teams. Noem dismissed CNN's reporting as "fake news" and "absolutely trash". (Note: CNN's report on FEMA's delayed response to the flood is based on anonymous sources. Snopes declared, "It was not possible to independently verify CNN's reporting as of this writing; therefore, we cannot rate the accuracy of this report." Snopes points out that after a June 18 CNN article on the policy itself, "Federal News Network, a publication for federal employees, published a report corroborating CNN's reporting." That story also quoted anonymous officials, but one of them confirmed in a post on LinkedIn that he had spoken to CNN. "In McLaughlin's email to Snopes, the DHS spokesperson did not deny CNN and Federal News Network's reporting, but she also did not directly confirm it.") A former FEMA administrator and a democratic congresswoman both criticized the need for executive approval, which, according to CNN, delayed the implementation of relief and rescue efforts.

=== Misinformation ===
Unfounded conspiracy theories and misinformation across the political spectrum also spread on social media in its aftermath. Influencers associated with QAnon spread conspiracies that the floods were a result of weather control and cloud seeding by the government. Shortly after the flood, Georgia congresswoman Marjorie Taylor Greene introduced a bill to make weather alteration a felony. Anti-government militia Veterans on Patrol called on its members to destroy NEXRAD weather radars. On July 6, a man broke into a radar system operated by News 9 in Oklahoma City and damaged its power supply, briefly knocking it offline; the suspect was later arrested over these actions. Republican candidate Kandiss Taylor called the events "Fake weather. Fake hurricanes. Fake flooding". During "Project South Texas Weather Modification Association", Rainmaker Technology Corporation, a company specializing in weather modification, seeded clouds in prior days in other areas of Texas and reported receiving a number of death threats due to unfounded online accusations of complicity in the floods.

== See also ==
- Weather of 2025
- Floods in the United States (2000–present)
- List of deadliest floods
- 1921 San Antonio floods – the deadliest freshwater flooding event on record in Texas
- 1987 Guadalupe River flood – a deadly flash flood that killed 10 campers from Pot O' Gold Ranch, a Christian summer camp, just 25 miles from Camp Mystic.
