= Slicker Wars =

Family disputes in Missouri, US

The Slicker Wars were a series of family disputes in the 1840s, taking place in Benton and Polk County, Missouri (Hickory County, between the two counties, was yet to be established). Following a period of escalation, Hiram Turk, patriarch of the Turk family, was shot and killed by Andy Jones, patriarch of the Jones family; Jones was acquitted of the murder. Afterward, other members of the Turk family performed vigilantist beatings upon the Jones family and their supporters, causing several deaths.

== Etymology ==
"Slicker Wars" come from "slicking", a historic colloquial term for a switching. The Turk family and their supporters – known as the "Slickers" practiced many switchings upon the Jones family and their supporters – known as the "Anti-Slickers".

Though, "Slicker" can broadly refer to vigilante groups in Missouri in the 19th century. Slicker groups existed in other counties, such as Lincoln and St. Charles Counties. Slicker groups had existed in Benton and Polk Counties as early as 1836, prior to the Slicker Wars.

== Escalation and feud ==
Hiram Kerr Turk was patriarch of the Turk family. Having moved from Tennessee in 1839 after refusing to pay off his land, he was a storeowner and barkeep in what is now Quincy, Missouri. He was described as polite, though combative. Andy Jones was patriarch of the Jones family. Having moved from Kentucky in the 1830s, he engaged in gambling, horse racing, and alleged counterfeiting.

During an 1840 election, Hiram's store was a polling place. Andy Jones entered the store, and began arguing with Jim Turk, Hiram's son. The argument caused Tom Turk, another son of Hiram, to draw his knife. The argument de-escalated without major injury or death, and the Turk family was charged with assault and inciting a riot. Jim Turk threatened a witness, Abraham Nowell, that he would be shot if he testified against the Turk family. Jim was subsequently shot dead, and Nowell disappeared.

Further escalation occurred when the Turk family kidnapped a relative of Andy Jones. The relative, James Morton, was being pursued by a bounty hunter for charges in Alabama, so the Turk family abducted him and delivered him to the bounty hunter. Hiram was charged with kidnapping, which was dropped.

On June or July 17, 1841, Hiram Turk was shot and killed by Andy Jones, for which he was later acquitted. Following the acquittal, the sons of Hiram Turk announced a vigilantic cleansing of the unsavory people of Belton and Polk Counties. Beginning on January 27, 1842, the Turk family and their supporters – the "Slickers", founded by Tom Turk – targeted the Jones family and their supporters – the "Anti-Slickers". When an Anti-Slicker was located, the slickers would tie them to trees and whip them with switches. Multiple deaths occurred as a result of these whippings. At the time, a whipping was colloquially known as a "slicking", which is the meaning behind the name "Slicker Wars".

Abraham Nowell, who killed Jim Turk in 1840, was shot dead by Slickers in November 1842. He had returned to Benton County in April, after which he was arrested then acquitted of the killing. After shooting Nowell, they attempted to kill Andy Jones, during which Samuel Yates, a neutral farmer, nearly died.

The Justice of the Peace of Benton County, DeWitt Ballou, had failed to end the violence. The violence ended when Governor Thomas Reynolds sent the Missouri Militia to the County and arrested 38 Slickers; no trial was held. Despite the feud officially ending, some Slickers continued their vigilantism. Other members of the Jones and Turk families still died from other violence, including:

- Tom Turk – murdered by a fellow Slicker.
- Andy Jones – executed by hanging after being caught stealing a horse. Nathan Turk testified against him.
- Nathan Turk – killed in a gunfight in Louisiana.

== See also ==
- Bald Knobbers

== Sources ==
- Yen, Connie Sue (2015). Horse-Stealing and Man-Hanging: An Examination of Vigilantism in the Missouri Ozarks in the Missouri Ozarks. Missouri State University.
