= New Mexico Civil Guard =

Independent militia founded in 2020

- heraldic device of the New Mexico Civil Guard
- Founding leader: Bryce Provance
- Leaders: Bryce Provance; Joel Mason
- Spokesperson: Aaron Hawking
- Dates active: 2020–2022
- Country: United States
- Active regions: New Mexico

The New Mexico Civil Guard (NMCG) is a New Mexico-based militia that was founded by Bryce Provance in 2020 before he left the group later that year.

The group was covered by national news media in 2020 due to an incidental shooting at a protest in Albuquerque, New Mexico attended by militia members.

== Presentation ==
Like many groups within the American militia movement, they claim to be a constitutional group in the vein of the American Revolutionary War Patriot militias.

== 2020 incident ==
During a protest taking place at La Jornada, a sculptural group depicting the settlement of New Mexico by Juan de Oñate and others, a man named Steven Ray Baca shot at protestors. A group of eight armed militia members at the protest were arrested and detained by law enforcement, then were released without any charges brought. Representatives of the militia stated that Baca had no connection with them. Both Governor Michelle Lujan Grisham and Mayor Tim Keller accused the group of trying to intimidate protesters.

Militia members made an appearance at several additional protests during 2020.

== Membership ==
Member of New Mexico Civil Guard announces he's running for Bernalillo County sheriff
- 1:37 report from KOB about Aaron Hawking
- Video on YouTube

In 2020, the New Mexico Civil Guard told the Albuquerque Journal that they had 150 members across the state of New Mexico. They ran members in local sheriffs races including Aaron Hawking as candidate for Bernalillo County Sheriff. They were seen at several events with Republican Senate and House candidates and made speeches at the New Mexico State Capitol.

== Lawsuit ==
The group was sued by then-district attorney for Bernalillo County Raúl Torrez with assistant counsel from the Institute for Constitutional Advocacy and Protection at Georgetown University Law Center. After the suit, members formed the New Mexico Civil Guard corporation. (Note: From https://enterprise.sos.nm.gov/search/business: Record #: 6248080 Initial Filing Date: 09/17/2020 Status: Revoked Entity Type: Domestic Nonprofit Corporation Agent: Joel Mason Officers: Ivan Stoltzfus (CEO), Danny Bragg (Treasurer), Joel Mason (Chairman of the Board) Directors: John Burks (Director), Derrick Scott (Director), David Rice (Director) Organizers and Incorporators: LegalZoom.com, Inc.: Incorporator) The New Mexico Supreme Court issued a subpeona to Meta to obtain evidence, and ultimately the Civil Guard was ordered not to act in the role of law enforcement or military. The NMCG group at the statue was ruled against but not the Corporation.

== Stated views ==
Members claimed to provide local rapid lawful response to emergency situations in the community, according to a defunct Facebook page. The user image of the page was a poster from Patriot Ordnance Factory with the text overlaid "militia is only a bad word if you're a tyrant". The page also posted that "the only thing that stops a bad guy with a gun, is a good guy with a gun — NRA". Bryce Provance cited Behold a Pale Horse as influential, and has referred to himself as "Standartenführer Totenkopfverbande".

== See also ==
- list of militia organizations in the United States § Statewide groups
