= P. Terry's =

Hamburger chain in Texas, U.S.

P. Terry's Burger Stand
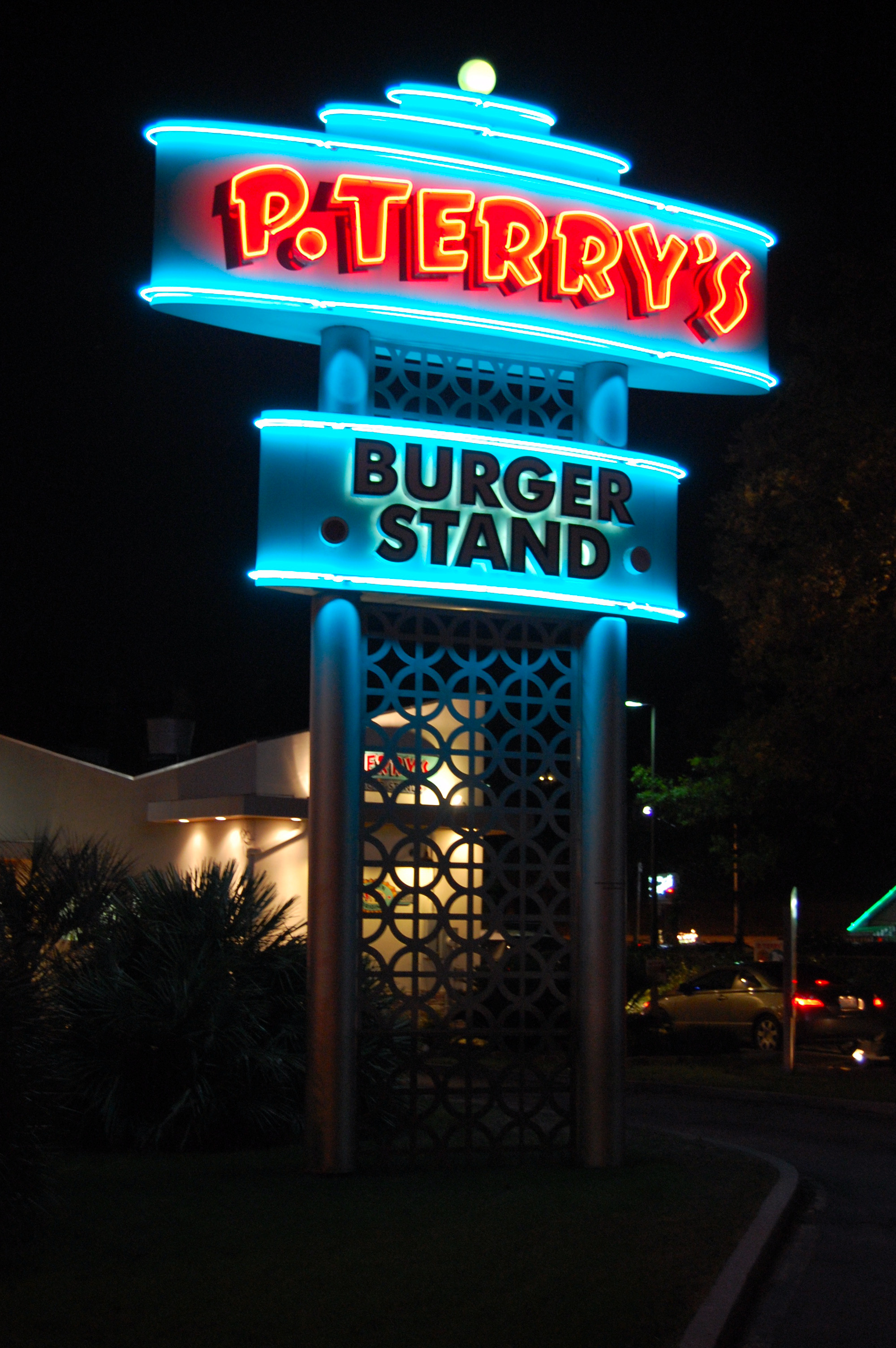
- Sign at original location
- Type: Private
- Industry: Restaurant
- Genre: Fast food
- Founded: July 5, 2005; 21 years ago in Austin, Texas, U.S.
- Founder: Patrick Terry, Kathy Terry
- Headquarters: Austin, Texas, U.S.
- Number of locations: 38 (2026)
- Area served: Texas
- Key people: Patrick Terry (CEO)
- Products: Hamburgers; Chicken sandwiches; French fries; Milkshakes
- Owner: Patrick Terry, Kathy Terry
- Number of employees: 1,800 (2026)
- Website: pterrys.com

P. Terry's Burger Stand is an American regional fast food restaurant chain, headquartered and based in Austin, Texas, that specializes in hamburgers. Founded by Patrick Terry and Kathy Terry, it opened its first restaurant at the corner of South Lamar and Barton Springs Rd, in the Zilker neighborhood of Austin, Texas, in 2005.

P. Terry's signature retro 1950s Googie architecture was inspired by the now defunct Mack Eplen's Drivateria in Abilene, Texas and brought to life by architect Michael Hsu.

In 2018, Southern Living called P. Terry's "America's Best Burger Chain".

As of May 2026, there are 38 locations, all in Texas, with no plans to expand outside of Texas.

== History ==
Raised in Abilene, Texas, founder Patrick Terry is the son of Bill Terry, who founded KTAB-TV. Patrick Terry graduated from Cooper High School in 1976 and graduated from the University of Texas at Austin in 1980 with a Bachelor of Science in Advertising.

Kathy Terry, on the other hand, transferred to the University of Texas from Angelo State University and graduated in 1982 with a Bachelor of Business Administration.

The two met in 1999 and married one another in 2004.

The name P. Terry's came about when Patrick and Kathy Terry were attending a party at a friend's house. The friend was also named Patrick, and as Patrick and Kathy Terry left, a fellow party attendee told Patrick Terry "Bye, P. Terry", to distinguish Patrick Terry from the host.

July 5, 2005 was the grand opening of P. Terry's first location, at 404 S Lamar Blvd, in Austin, Texas, at the intersection of South Lamar and Barton Springs Rd, in Austin, Texas. Previously housing a Short Stop Burgers, this location was catty cornered to a McDonald's, which had been there since 1978 (and which wound up closing in 2022). This placement forced P. Terry's to find mechanisms by which it might distinguish itself from the competition.

In 2006, the Terrys started Giving Back Days, wherein, on one Saturday a quarter, all profits are donated to local charities. As of November 2025, $2.4 million has been donated to underserved communities in Austin, Houston, and San Antonio, via these Giving Back Days.

P. Terry's opened a second and a third Austin area location in 2009.

In 2016, a "massive buyout offer" was made to purchase P. Terry, however, declined this offer after watching The Intern. A line that Anne Hathaway's character uttered towards the end of the movie - "No one will ever care about your company the way you do" - struck a chord with the Terry's and the offer was thus declined.

Todd Coerver replaced Patrick Terry as CEO from March 1, 2019 to December 12, 2023. Todd Coerver had previously served as CEO of Colorado-based Larkburger from 2016 to 2019 and COO of Taco Cabana before that. At the time of his hire, P. Terry's only had a presence in Central Texas. "It felt like it made more sense to bring someone in who had experience in taking concepts and enlarging them into other markets, as opposed to me figuring it out as it goes along", Patrick Terry told the Austin American-Statesman in 2019.

P. Terry's opened its first Houston location in 2024.

On Thursday, July 10, 2025, in the aftermath of the July 2025 Central Texas floods, P. Terry's held a fundraiser for the victims of the floods, wherein all profits would be donated to the Austin Disaster Relief Network. Customers showed up in droves. Wait times to place orders averaged an hour, and customers had to wait upwards of 45 additional minutes after that to get their food. The drive-thru lines were, at times, two miles in length and stores had to close early because they ran out of food. Third-party and online orders wound up being turned off to meet demand from in-person customers. Ultimately, $150,000 was raised for flood victims, an amount that was 2.5x their next largest Giving Back Day and did not count as one of their quarterly Giving Back Days. At the time, P. Terry's had 36 locations, two of which were 24 hour locations.

On June 9, 2026, P. Terry's announced that they were opening an Employee Ownership Trust wherein, among other things, P. Terry's employees that have been employed by P. Terry's for two years or longer would receive profit sharing to the tune of 5% with the intention of upping that to 20% at some later date.

== Influences ==
The Abilene-based restaurant Mack Eplen's Drivateria, which was active from the 1930s through the late 1970s and, at its peak, operated twelve locations, heavily influenced the design of P. Terry's, from its retro interior, exterior menu signs and drive thru line to its use of a commissary kitchen and even the font in the P. Terry's logo.

Kathy Terry's reading of Fast Food Nation inspired the Terry's to use higher-quality than normal ingredients and to treat their employees with more dignity and respect than is typical in the fast food industry. In-so-far as how that's influenced their foodstuff: P. Terry's uses Idaho Burbank potatoes instead of the fast-food go-to Kennebec potato for their french fries, which they fry in canola oil instead of the more common peanut oil. Their ketchup doesn't use corn syrup, their hormone and antibiotic-free Black Angus beef is never frozen. Foodstuff is prepared in local commissary kitchens and shipped to the various restaurants via refrigerated trucks. As a consequence of all of this, P. Terry's food costs are 5% higher than their competitors.

Insofar as how Fast Food Nation influenced their treatment of employees: in February 2021, P. Terry's bumped their minimum wage from $12 / hour to $15 / hour in a state where the average fast-food worker makes between $10.24 and $10.53 / hour. Even when P. Terry's paid $11.00 in 2017, their pay was notable enough to merit an entire article in The Daily Beast. The chain also provides interest-free loans to employees and has birthday cakes baked and delivered by a dedicated staff member. Before the creation of that role, Kathy Terry would bake and deliver the cakes herself, which she did for nine years.
