= 1987 Guadalupe River flood =

Deadly flood in Texas, U.S. in 1987

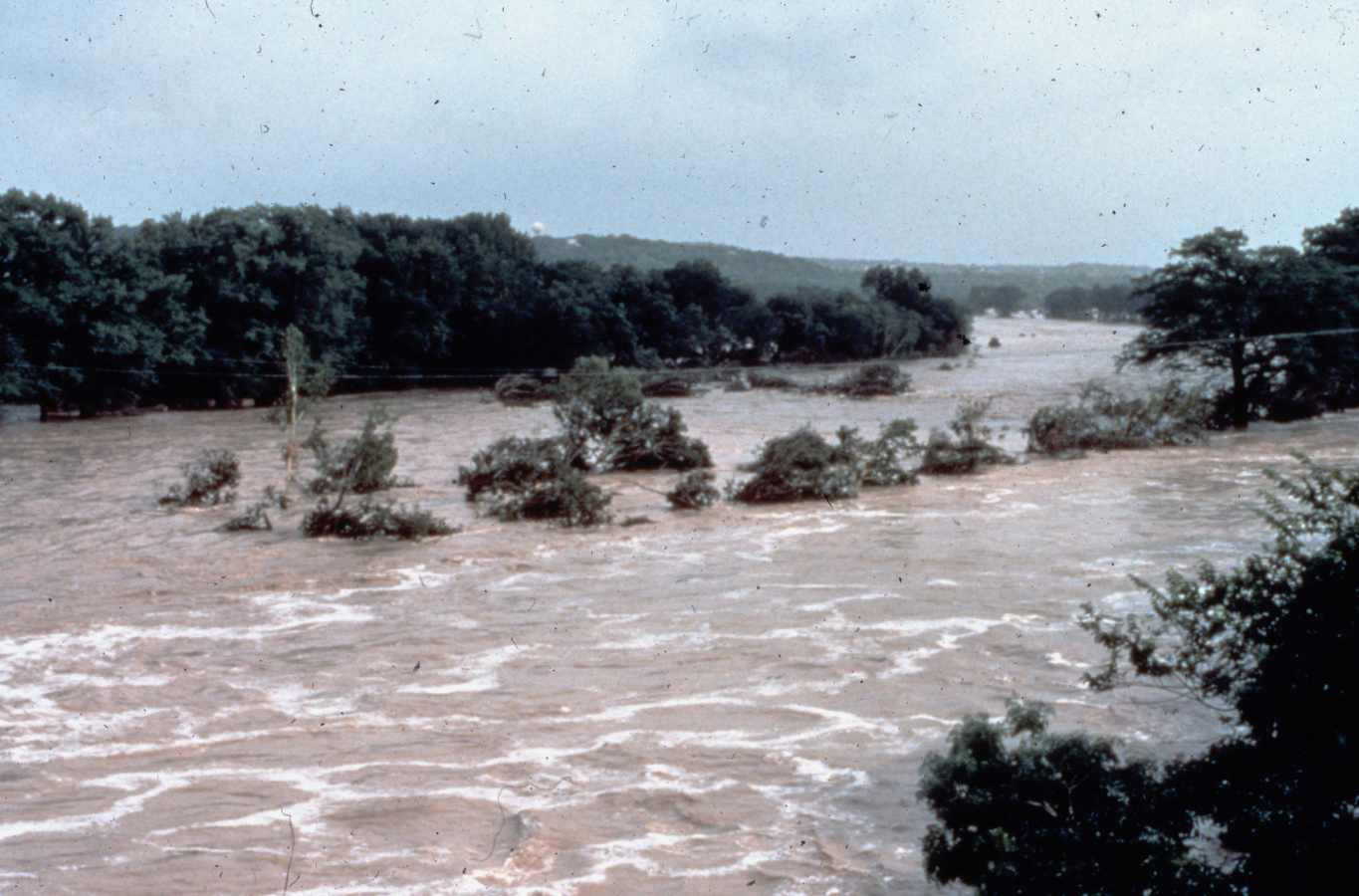
- Photo of the flooding in the Guadalupe river on July 17.
- Cause: Training effect of slow-moving thunderstorms triggered by a mid-level low interacting with a cold front and massive amount of moisture from the Gulf of Mexico.

Meteorological history
- Duration: July 16–17, 1987

Flood
- Max. rainfall: 11.50 inches (292.1 mm)

Overall effects
- Fatalities: 10
- Missing: 33
- Areas affected: Texas Hill Country, Central Texas

The 1987 Guadalupe River flood was a major flash flood that occurred along the Guadalupe River in the U.S. state of Texas.

== Meteorological synopsis ==
During the evening hours of July 16 and 17, severe thunderstorms began developing and slowly moved eastward through the Hill Country. Heavy rainfall occurred as a training effect started as a result of storms following one another. This was started by a mid-level low interacting with a weak cold front to the north and tremendous amounts of moisture from the Gulf of Mexico.

== Impacts and casualties ==
Before the floods, over 300 children from several churches attended a church camp at the Pot O' Gold Ranch, located about 2 miles (3.2 km) southwest of Comfort, Texas. On July 17, the camp was planning to conclude on that day when the floods hit.

The flooding began after a train-effect of thunderstorms brought torrential rain to the headwaters of the river in the late evening of July 16, and moved slowly eastward during the early morning of July 17. The National Weather Service, San Antonio, issued a series of flash flood warnings from 1:01am. People along the river and its tributaries were evacuated, and law enforcement officials instructed camp officials to move everyone to high ground, clear of the floodplain. By 4:35am, Camp Mystic officials reported that all campers were accounted for.

During the following hour, a flood crest 30 feet (9.1 m) to 3 feet (0.91 m) high was reported to be gaining height, west of Hunt. A massive flood wave traveled rapidly downriver, through Ingram, Kerrville, and eventually Comfort, Texas. Over 300 children were attending a church camp at the Pot O' Gold Ranch, about 2 miles (3.2 km) upriver from Comfort. Although around 2am law enforcement officials warned the camp against trying to cross the river, around 7:45am buses and a van attempted evacuation. The last bus and the van got stuck. Passengers were helped to wade to dry ground, but a wall of water swept 39 teenagers and 4 adults away. Ten teenage children drowned, the others were rescued.

== See also ==
- July 2025 Central Texas floods
