= Texas Division of Emergency Management =

Government agency in Texas, U.S.

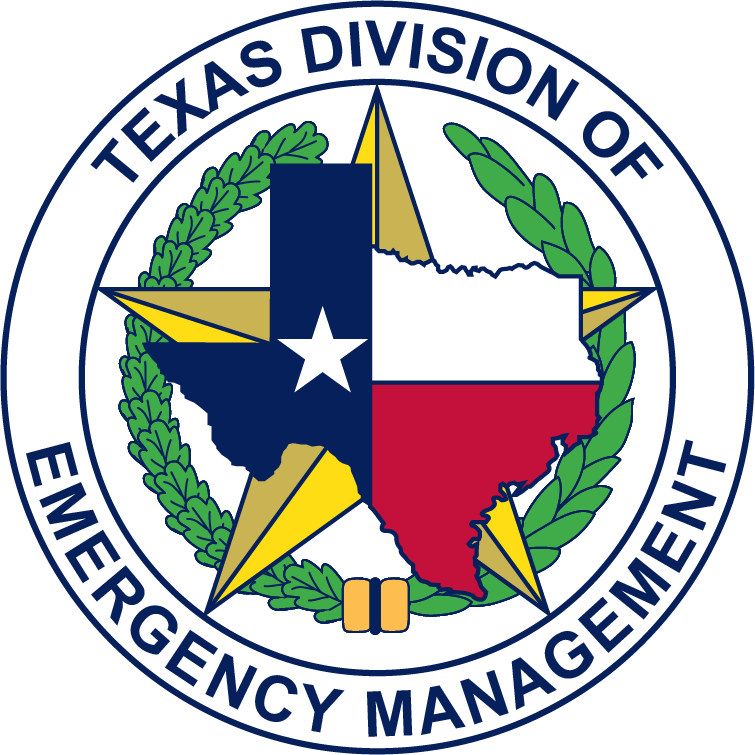

Agency overview
- Formed: 2019
- Preceding agencies: Texas Department of Public Safety, Division of Emergency Management; Governor's Division of Emergency Management
- Jurisdiction: Texas
- Headquarters: Austin, Texas
- Employees: 600+
- Annual budget: $6.6 billion
- Agency executives: Nim Kidd, Texas Emergency Management Chief & Vice Chancellor - Disaster & Emergency Services at The Texas A&M University System; Warren "Country" Weidler, Deputy Chief; Orlando Alanis, Assistant Agency Director & Chief of State Operations and Incident Support; Blair Walsh, Assistant Agency Director & Chief of External Affairs; Wes Rapaport, Chief of Media and Communications.
- Parent department: Texas A&M University System
- Key document: https://tdem.texas.gov/executive-guide
- Website: tdem.texas.gov

The Texas Division of Emergency Management (TDEM) is a state agency that coordinates Texas's emergency management program. TDEM implements programs to increase public awareness about threats and hazards, coordinates emergency planning, provides an extensive array of specialized training for emergency responders and local officials, and administers disaster recovery and hazard mitigation programs in Texas.

TDEM had a total budget of $6.6 billion for 2022–2023.

== Organization ==
TDEM currently operates and manages eight statewide regions and 21 individual disaster districts across the State of Texas in support of disaster response. These districts also align with councils of governments (COGs) that are composed of city, county and special district governments.

To support the regions, districts and jurisdictions, TDEM headquarters is organized into internal divisions, sections and units. The Preparedness, Recovery and Mitigation divisions and the State Operations Center staff support the corresponding field staff.

=== Regions ===
TDEM is broken up into eight main individual regions to support statewide disaster response. Regional Assistant Chiefs (one per region) and Regional Section Chiefs (Response/Preparedness (one) or Recovery/Mitigation (one)) oversee regional staff. They have multiple roles, as they carry out emergency preparedness activities, coordinate emergency response operations, support recovery efforts and aid in mitigation measures. In their preparedness role, they assist local officials in carrying out emergency planning, training, and exercises, and developing emergency teams and facilities.

Regional staff also teach a wide variety of emergency management training courses. In their response role, they deploy to incident sites to assess damages, identify urgent needs, advise local officials regarding state assistance, and coordinate deployment of state emergency resources to assist local emergency responders.

=== Disaster districts, EOCs and committees ===
Texas is broken up into 21 individual districts within the main eight regions, with each individual district having an assigned District Chief. The District Chiefs oversee their districts' respective County Liaison Officers, who are assigned to specific county(s). Each district also has a Disaster District Committee (DDC) made up of the same members as the state Emergency Management Council. The chair of each district committee is appointed by the Chief of TDEM. The district chair and committee members operate the Disaster District Emergency Operations Center (DDEOC).

Previously, the districts were aligned with the Texas Highway Patrol districts, with the district commanding officer serving as the chair of the disaster district. Now, the districts are aligned with local council of governments.

== Texas Emergency Management Council ==
To organize the state response to emergencies and disasters, the TDEM Chief chairs the Texas Emergency Management Council. The council is made up of state level agencies and organizations. It was established by the Texas Legislature to advise and assist the Governor in all matters relating to disaster mitigation, emergency preparedness, disaster response, and recovery.

Member agencies and organizations:

- American Red Cross (ARC)
- Department of Information Resources (DIR)
- General Land Office (GLO)
- State Auditor's Office (SAO)
- State Comptroller of Public Accounts (CPA)
- Texas A&M AgriLife Extension Service
- Texas Animal Health Commission (TAHC)
- Texas Attorney General's Office (OAG)
- Texas Commission on Environmental Quality (TCEQ)
- Texas Commission on Fire Protection (TCFP)
- Texas Department of Aging and Disability Services (DADS)
- Texas Department of Agriculture (TDA)
- Texas Department of Criminal Justice (TDCJ)
- Texas Department of Family Protective Services (DFPS)
- Texas Department of Housing and Community Affairs (TDHCA)
- Texas Department of Insurance (TDI)
- Texas Department of Public Safety (TXDPS)
- Texas Department of State Health Services (DSHS)
- Texas Department of Transportation (TXDOT)
- Texas Division of Emergency Management (TDEM)
- Texas Education Agency (TEA)
- Texas A&M Engineering Extension Service (TEEX)
- Texas A&M Forest Service (TAMFS)
- Texas Health & Human Services Commission (HHSC)
- Texas Military Department
- Texas Office of Court Administration
- Texas Parks and Wildlife Department (TPWD)
- Texas Procurement and Support Services (TPASS)
- Texas Public Utility Commission (PUC)
- Texas Railroad Commission (RRC)
- Texas Workforce Commission (TWC)
- The Salvation Army (TSA)
- University of North Texas System
- University of Texas System
- Texas A&M University System
- Texas Tech University System
- University of Houston System
- Texas State University System
- Texas VOAD

== Leadership ==
TDEM is led by a Chief who serves as the agency director. The Chief is assisted by a deputy Chief and three Assistant Agency Directors.

TDEM is currently led by the Chief of the Texas Division of Emergency Management, Nim Kidd. He has served as the Chief of the Texas Division of Emergency Management since 2010. Kidd is also the vice chancellor for Disaster and Emergency Services. Kidd is a Certified Emergency Manager, Texas Master Firefighter, and holds Hazardous Materials and Emergency Medical Technician Certifications.

== Disasters and operations ==
TDEM has supported statewide emergency response for over 341 disasters. As part of Operation Lone Star, TDEM has been used on immigrants and during tropical storms.

It also works on safety outreach.

=== The Jack Colley State Operations Center ===
The agency maintains the state's warning point at the State Operations Center (SOC), which operates 24/7/365. It is named after Jack Colley, who served as Chief of TDEM from 1993 to 2010. Currently the SOC sits below DPS headquarters in a renovated underground former Civil Defense bunker. The SOC houses a large operations floor for the Emergency Management Council, several meeting rooms, office space for the State Management Team, Technology Operations staff, division leadership and the state warning point known as the bubble.

During COVID, TDEM temporarily moved the SOC to a nearby hotel.

New HQ & SOC

General information
- Status: Under construction
- Location: 4125 S. FM 973, Austin, TX
- Groundbreaking: TBD
- Cost: $423 million USD

Technical details
- Grounds: 48 acres

==== New Headquarters & SOC ====
With the transition from DPS to the Texas A&M University System, TDEM received money to build a new headquarters and state operations center. Being built just east of Austin–Bergstrom International Airport and the Travis County Jail, cost of the new facility is in the range of $300 to $423 million USD.

=== Texas Emergency Management Conference ===
Every year TDEM hosts the Texas Emergency Management Conference (TEMC). The conference is 4–5 days long, includes an opening session, awards luncheon, training courses, lectures, an exhibit hall and a closing ceremony. It is geared towards elected officials, first responders, emergency managers and decision makers.

=== Texas Emergency Management Academy ===
In 2022, TDEM created "The Academy", in an effort to formalize and standardize emergency management education.

== History ==
The Texas Division of Emergency Management (TDEM) was founded in August 1981 as a division under the Texas Department of Public Safety.

In 2019, the 86th Texas Legislature transferred TDEM from the Texas Department of Public Safety to the Texas A&M University System as a stand alone state agency.

In April 2022, TDEM was used to transport processed immigrants. It was used again in September 2023.
