= Missouri Citizens Militia =

Organization based in Missouri

- Abbreviation: MCM
- Formation: 2010
- Type: private non-governmental Paramilitary militia
- Key people: Aaron Penberthy (founder), Jeremy Decker (State Commander)
- Volunteers: 5,000+
- Website: Missouri Citizens Militia

The Missouri Citizens Militia (MCM) is a private militia in the U.S. state of Missouri.

== History and description ==
The Missouri Citizens Militia was founded in 2010 by Aaron Penberthy.

The Missouri Citizens Militia is distinct from the state's National Guard and state defense force in that it is not associated with or funded by the state or federal governments. In 2017, MCM general officer Jeremy Decker denied they were an anti-government militia.

== Activities ==
The Missouri Citizens Militia has been involved in several regionally located public activities (usually training in Missouri Ozark Mountains), including:

- responding to natural disasters
- holding clothing, food and toy drives to help victims of natural disasters.
- blocking members of the Westboro Baptist Church when they have staged protests within Missouri.

In 2014, members of the MCM, including its founder, Aaron Penberthy, traveled to the site of the Bundy standoff to join other armed protesters in their standoff against the Bureau of Land Management.

In July 2015, the militia was involved in an Oath Keepers mission, which involved standing guard outside an armed forces career center following the 2015 Chattanooga shootings which killed four marines and one sailor.

In May 2017, the Oregon County Sheriff requested flood relief assistance from the militia. The militia deployed for two weeks in Thomasville, Missouri.
