= Kentucky State Militia =

American militia group based in Kentucky

- Leader: Stephen Anderson
- Dates active: c. 1996–2001
- Active regions: Kentucky, United States

The Kentucky State Militia was a militia movement organization based in the state of Kentucky, United States. The paramilitary group became known for a manhunt, which ended with the seizure of various firearms and ammunition, used by the group.

== Crimes committed by members and ex-members ==
Stephen Howard Anderson, an adherent of the Christian Identity movement was previously a "major" in the Kentucky State Militia; he was expelled from the group in April 2001 after making a series of racist and antisemitic comments, with the group's "assistant commander" calling Anderson "a little too extreme for us." Anderson had been known for his extremist broadcasts on a militia-themed short-wave radio show called The Militia Hour, an illegal pirate radio program.

In October 2001, Anderson fired gunshots at a Bell County, Kentucky deputy sheriff at a traffic stop; Anderson had been pulled over for lacking functioning taillights. At the traffic stop, Anderson claimed that he was "on patrol" with the Kentucky State Militia and was heavily armed; he fled police and fired several rifle shots before abandoning his pickup truck in Middlesboro, Kentucky, loaded with a cache of ammunition and pipe bombs. Indicted on explosive charges in federal court in Kentucky, he fled into the mountains, where he became a fugitive wanted by the FBI, ATF, and Kentucky State Police.

On November 22, 2002, Anderson was arrested by police in a rural part of Cherokee County, North Carolina. The arrest came following a tip from a person who had seen a June 2002 segment on America's Most Wanted profiling Anderson. Anderson issued an apology for his actions, pleaded guilty, and was convicted of weapons charges stemming from the confrontation with police; in May 2003, he was sentenced to fifteen years in prison.

Charles N. Puckett was commander of the group until resigning in September 2001. He was arrested in February 2002 for illegally possessing guns and other weapons (which Puckett, as a previously convicted felon, could not legally possess). Puckett fled from house arrest before turning himself in about three weeks later. He subsequently entered into a plea agreement with federal prosecutors, in which he admitted to two weapons charges and to intimidating a witness. He was sentenced to 30 months and a day in prison, followed by supervised probation.
