= Ohio Defense Force =

Privately organized militia in the state of Ohio

- Abbreviation: ODF
- Formation: 1989
- Type: private non-governmental paramilitary militia
- Location: Ohio
- Members: 300 (claimed by ODF)
- Key people: William B. Alexander (founder)

The Ohio Defense Force (ODF) is a right-wing privately organized militia in the state of Ohio. The Ohio Defense Force is not a part of the US Military, the Ohio National Guard, nor Ohio's similarly named State Defense Force. Rather, it is organized, led, and staffed by private citizens. The Southern Poverty Law Center lists the Ohio Defense Force as an anti-governmental organization.

The Ohio Defense Force, originally named the Southeastern Ohio Defense Force, was founded in 1989 as a non-profit corporation. In 2004, the organization decided to expand statewide and was renamed the Ohio Defense Force. TIME journalists conducted extensive interviews with members of the group during a training exercise in their piece "The Secret World of Extreme Militias".
