= Viper Militia =

Arizona anti-government militia since 1995

Arizona Viper Militia
- Leader: Randy L. Nelson
- Dates active: 1995–
- Active regions: Arizona, United States
- Ideology: American nationalism National conservatism Sovereign citizen movement

The Viper Militia (also known as Arizona Viper Militia or Phoenix Viper Militia) was an anti-government militia group created in 1995. The militants planned for more than two years to bomb government buildings in the state, in addition to carrying out training with firearms (several of them obtained illegally).

== History ==
=== Arizona's plot attacks ===
In 1995 the Bureau of Alcohol, Tobacco, Firearms and Explosives start to follow some intelligence reports from a militia with extremist views in Arizona.The ATF started infiltrating an agent to the group and was seeing in detail various plans to attack and kill the ATF and other law enforcement officials, highlighting attacking their facilities with explosives in Phoenix. The group are said to have held training exercises in the Arizona desert as well as the detonation of small charges Ammonium nitrate bombs. After a six-month undercover investigation the ATF organized a series of raids to disarticulate the group.

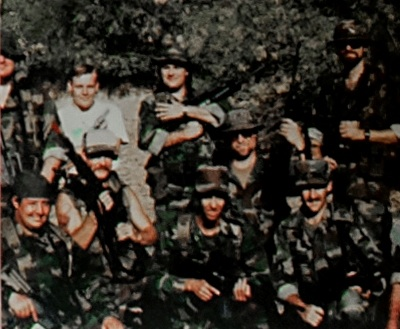
Image of the Phoenix Viper Militia members.

=== Arrests ===
June 2, 1996, federal authorities arrested twelve militants (ten men and two women), most of the detainees had felony charges. At the moment of their arrests none of the suspects offered resistance. Also involved in the arrests were agents of the U.S. Marshals Service, the Customs Service, the Federal Bureau of Land Management, Arizona National Guard, the Arizona Department of Public Safety and the Maricopa County Attorney's Office, and Phoenix police officers. The authorities seized 650 pounds of Ammonium nitrate, military vests, detonadores, training manuals, bulletproof vests, seventy assault rifles, ammunition and an unidentified amount of Picric acid (a quite toxic and unstable compound for the elaboration of explosives). ATF agents were going to search another 400 pounds of ammonium nitrate and 55 gallons of nitromethane. The authorities seized a video tape from May 1994 in which they discuss internal security matters and planning attacks and targets. After the arrests the authorities confirmed that the group was totally disjointed and had no ties with other paramilitary organizations.

One of the arrested Randy L. Nelson (the self declared general of the group) stated about the group's use of explosives saying that they "would not join a plot to hurt people", and that only attack the buildings. Day later the court conditionally release six members from the jail pending your trial for membership by a terrorist organization and the seizure of unregistered weapons. In March 1997 all the members of the group are sentenced to terms of one to ten years in prison, most defendants pleading guilty. The arrests and trials brought with them a debate among militiamen about the actions of the militias and how necessary the use of explosives really was (something they had in common in militias that had been dismantled by the authorities during the 90s).

In September 2005 federal authorities mention that the group has been reintegrated, being more secretive in the admission of members, in addition to mentioning that its main mission is to fight the "New World Order".
