= 1st Mechanical Kansas Militia =

American terrorist group

- Leader: Bradley Glover
- Dates active: 1996–unknown
- Active regions: Kansas United States
- Ideology: Militia movement

The 1st Kansas Mechanical Militia was a militia-movement organization based in Kansas, United States. The group became known for openly campaigning for war against the federal government of the United States and claiming that Chinese communist troops were training on American soil. It is unknown if the group is still active.

== Activities and failed attacks ==
The group was led by Bradley Glover, a conspiracy theorist. The Militia itself claimed to have around 1000 members. The group maintained contact with other anti-government groups and individuals such as Kevin and Terry Hobeck from Ohio, Ronald Griesacker from the Republic of Texas Militia Group, and Merlon "Butch" Lingenfelter, Jr., a longtime follower of the UFO phenomenon. Two FBI agents infiltrated and observed the group. Glover and others wanted to attack the 4th of July Independence Day celebrations of 1997 at Fort Hood. Glover and Michael Dorsett were arrested in July 16. Seven men and women arrested during the month of July had planned to use antipersonnel bombs and other weapons at bases where they believed United Nations troops were stationed, said Lt. Richard Coffey of the Missouri Highway Patrol. They were initially charged with possession of illegal weapons.

The FBI investigation and the work of the Missouri State Highway Patrol prevented the attack. Glover was sentenced to five years in prison. The group was also known as 7th Division Constitutional Militia, Kansas Militia, Southern Kansas Regional Militia, Southern Kansas Regional Militia (suspected), First Kansas Mechanized Infantry (suspected)
