= Missouri Militia =

American paramilitary organization

- Missouri flag
- Founded: 1982
- Location: Missouri, United States
- Website: www.missourimilitia.com

The Missouri Militia is a paramilitary organization in the U.S. state of Missouri. The organization is not a formation of the Missouri State Defense Force (an element of the Missouri state militia).

The group is distinct from the Missouri National Guard in that they are not associated with or funded by the State or U.S. government. Its members were active in disaster relief after the 2011 Joplin tornado.
