= Veterans on Patrol =

American anti-government militia

- Formation: 2015
- Founder: Michael "Lewis Arthur" Meyer
- Type: Militia
- Purpose: Far-right vigilantism and activism
- Headquarters: Pima County, Arizona
- Website: https://youtube.com/@VeteransOnPatrol

Veterans on Patrol (VOP) is a far-right and anti-government militia founded by Michael "Lewis Arthur" Meyer in 2015. The group became known for spreading conspiracy theories on social media and conducting vigilante patrols against purported human trafficking on the Mexico–United States border. The group attracted national attention in 2025 after threatening to attack radar stations run by the National Oceanic and Atmospheric Administration, claiming they were secretly being used for weather modification.

== History and aims ==
Veterans on Patrol was founded in Pima County, Arizona in 2015 with the initial aim of supporting military veterans by Michael "Lewis Arthur" Meyer. Despite the name "Veterans on Patrol", its co-founder, Michael "Lewis Arthur" Meyer, is not a veteran. Since 2018, the activities of the organization shifted away from the initially stated goals and towards vigilantism against purported anti-human trafficking activities on the Mexico–United States border. The Guardian described such operations as originating from Meyer's "conspiracy narratives fueled by his apocalyptic Christian nationalist beliefs". The group is known for embedding in communities to "launch missions related to migrants or purported child trafficking".

The philosophy shared by the group includes antisemitic, anti-Mormon, anti-Catholic, and anti-indigenous views. Members also embrace the disproven QAnon conspiracy theory. The organization is known for using social media to spread unsubstantiated claims about activities along the border, and in 2019 had a Facebook page with approximately 70,000 followers.

In 2018, the group labelled a homeless encampment as a child sex-trafficking location, although authorities found no evidence to support the claim. In 2018 and 2019, Meyer was arrested several times for trespassing and other charges regarding his group's unauthorized presence on private and public lands. During this time, the group maintained an active presence in southern Arizona during this period, although with diminished public attention. The group has been criticized by law enforcement agencies for interfering with legitimate investigations and potentially compromising real criminal cases.

In 2020, the group destroyed several migrant watering station in Arizona's Pima county claiming they were used by cartel scouts. In response, the Pima county sheriff's office put out an arrest warrant for Meyer over the alleged vandalism.

In 2024, the group attracted controversy after an operation in Spokane, Washington where the group's second-in-command, Shawna Martin, lives. The organization made false claims of trafficking activities near homeless encampments, and were accused by local authorities and homeless advocacy groups of harassing and filming individuals without their consent.

The group claimed that Hurricane Helene was "an act of war perpetuated(sic) by the United States Military"; a "land grab" responsible for "murdering hundreds, if not thousands, of Americans". It readily spread misinformation about the 2024 Atlantic hurricane season, promoting multiple false claims that the storm was intentionally created by the military and said it would destroy military equipment in the area.

In 2025, the group threatened to attack weather radars run by the National Oceanic and Atmospheric Administration claiming that the radar sites were secretly being used for weather modification.

== See also ==
- Patriot movement
