= James Wickstrom =

American white supremacist (1942–2018)

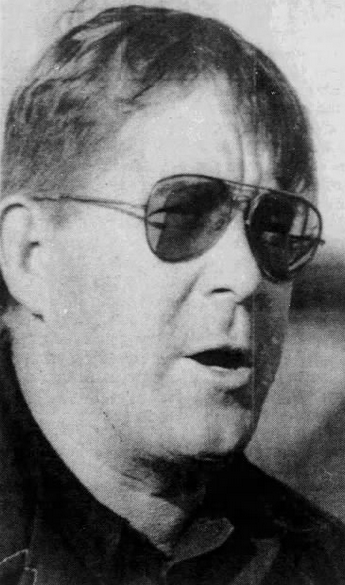
- Wickstrom in 1983
- Born: James Paul Wickstrom; October 7, 1942; Munising, Michigan, U.S.
- Died: March 24, 2018 (aged 75); Linwood, Michigan, U.S.
- Occupations: Minister, activist, radio host, salesman
- Years active: Early 1970s–2018
- Movement: Christian Identity; Posse Comitatus; Patriot movement Militia movement

James Paul Wickstrom (October 7, 1942 – March 24, 2018) was an American white supremacist, far-right activist, and Christian Identity minister. He was a founding member of the Posse Comitatus, an antisemitic, anti-government and anti-tax group associated with the broader militia movement.

== Biography ==
Wickstrom was born and raised in Munising, Michigan. During the 1960s, he protested the Vietnam War on the grounds that it was being fought for "Jew bankers." For a time, he worked as a salesman for Snap-on.

His affiliation with Christian Identity began in the early 1970s, when he joined Mission of Jesus the Christ Church in Humansville, Missouri, which was co-founded by William Potter Gale. After several unsuccessful political campaigns, Wickstrom became a full-time activist and minister of Christian Identity and the affiliated Posse Comitatus movement. In 1995, he opened Information Consulting Corp, a retail store which sold survival gear, outdoor apparel and videotapes about militias.

In March 2018, it was reported by the Southern Poverty Law Center that Wickstrom had died; the report was attributed to unnamed "sources within the white supremacist movement". More details appeared in a report on Michigan-based website Mlive.com, which reported that Wickstrom had been living in Linwood, Michigan.

== Activities ==
In 1980, Wickstrom ran unsuccessfully in Wisconsin as a Constitution Party of Wisconsin candidate for United States Senator, coming in third with 16,156 votes; and he was a Wisconsin representative on the American Independent Party's national committee. He was the party's nominee for Governor of Wisconsin in 1982, coming in fourth with 7,721 votes; and he remained on the national committee. During this same period, he drew national attention to the ideology of the Posse Comitatus movement, as an outspoken defender of the rights and concerns of Gordon Kahl, including an appearance on the Phil Donahue Show. In 1985, after his arrest, he was no longer listed as an official of the Constitution Party of Wisconsin.

Wickstrom subsequently adopted the title of "national director of counter-insurgency" for Posse Comitatus. He was affiliated with Aryan Nations, and visited their Hayden, Idaho compound several times. In 1995, after serving a prison sentence for counterfeiting and illegal possession of a firearm, he moved back to Munising. He started a new Christian Identity organization and operated a Posse Comitatus website with August Kreis. The ministry later moved to Hampton Township, and again to Tennessee.

Periodically, Wickstrom wrote racially-inspired articles, and he also operated as a pastor in Christian Identity organizations. He later hosted a daily Internet radio show called Yahweh's Truth, where he promoted Identity ideology and conducted interviews. The program was run through Covenant People’s Ministry, an Identity organization based in Brooks, Georgia. The show billed him as "Dr. John Wickstrom," though he was not known to hold any doctorate degrees through an accredited institution.

== Ideology ==
Wickstrom derived his beliefs from his interpretation of the Christian Bible. He preached what he referred to as Two Seedline Racial Covenant Identity, an ideology which among other things, postulates the belief that the Caucasian race is made in the image of God. Furthermore, people of Jewish descent are not considered the "children of God", instead, they are considered the children of Cain. Wickstrom categorically rejected the Jewish religious doctrine which states that the Jews are "God's chosen people" by stating that members of the "white western, European" race are the actual Israelites who are referred to in the Christian Bible.

== Rhetoric ==
Wickstrom's racist and anti-Semitic rhetoric frequently drew the attention of activist groups such as the Southern Poverty Law Center and the Anti-Defamation League. In a 2004 interview, Wickstrom joked about beating Jews to death and throwing them into wood chippers:

"Take these chairs and Jews after they're beaten to death, throw 'em in the wood chipper! And from the wood chipper let the remains go into a big incinerary [sic] truck, which is right behind the wood chipper, and give them the holocaust they rightly deserve!"

== Criminal activities and convictions ==
In January 1982, Wickstrom lost an election for the chairman of the town of Fairbanks, Wisconsin. He decided to set up his own municipality, a Posse enclave on the banks of the Embarras River within the boundaries of Fairbanks. He put public notice of the creation of the "Constitutional Township of Tigerton Dells" and a meeting to elect officers of the township in a local paper. The announcement described Wickstrom as an "acting clerk"; at the meeting, Wickstrom was "elected" clerk and municipal judge and fellow Posse member Donald Minniecheske was "elected" the Tigerton Dells Chairman and Assessor.

Over the next seven months, Wickstrom took applications for and issued a liquor license and a cigarette license, attempted to file various documents which indicated that he was a judge or a town clerk with local and state offices, and threatened to sue the Shawano County county clerk if she did not cooperate with his demand for official printed ballots.

Since none of these activities were lawful under the relevant Wisconsin statutes, in 1983, Wickstrom was arrested for "assuming to act as [a] public officer". (During the trial, he announced to the court that he planned to set up similar townships in other states, and had the presiding judge served with an ersatz "subpoena" for a "Citizens Grand Jury", signing the document as "Judge". He was found guilty, and served over thirteen months in jail (he had received the maximum nine-month sentence on each count, to be served consecutively). (Minniecheske was sentenced to nine years in prison for possession of stolen property and other crimes.) Wickstrom's sentence was eventually commuted; as a condition of the terms of his release, he was not allowed to associate with members of the Posse or members of similar groups. He moved to Pennsylvania, and was later arrested for illegally possessing firearms as a convicted felon and planning to distribute $100,000 (~$272,228 in 2025) in counterfeit U.S. currency to white supremacists who were attending the 1988 Aryan World Congress. Prosecutors alleged that the counterfeiting was part of a scheme to finance the activities of far-right paramilitary groups and militias.

In 1990, Wickstrom was found guilty and sentenced to 38 months in prison.

== See also ==
- KTTL
