= Radical right (United States) =

Political preference that leans towards the far-right

In the politics of the United States, the radical right is a political preference that leans towards ultraconservatism, white nationalism, white supremacy, or other far-right ideologies in a hierarchical structure which is paired with conspiratorial rhetoric alongside traditionalist and reactionary aspirations. The term was first used by social scientists in the 1950s regarding small groups such as the John Birch Society in the United States, and since then it has been applied to similar groups worldwide. The term "radical" was applied to the groups because they sought to make fundamental (hence "radical") changes within institutions and remove persons and institutions that threatened their values or economic interests from political life.

== Terminology ==
There has been disagreement among academics and social scientists over how the right-wing political movement should be described. No consensus on the proper terminology exists, although the terminology developed in the 1950s—based on the use of the words "radical" or "extremist"—is the most commonly used. Other scholars simply prefer to call them "The Right" or "conservatives," which is what they call themselves. The terminology is used to describe a broad range of movements. The term "radical right" was coined by Seymour Martin Lipset. It was included in a book titled The New American Right (1955). The contributors to that book identified a conservative "responsible Right" as represented by the Republican administration of Dwight D. Eisenhower and a radical right that wished to change political and social life. Further to the right of the radical right, they identified themselves as the "ultra-right", adherents of which advocated drastic change, but would only use violence against the state in extreme cases. In the decades since, the ultra-right, while adopting the basic ideology of the 1950s radical right, has updated it to encompass what it sees as threats posed by the modern world. It has leveraged fear of those threats to draw new adherents and encourage support of a more militant approach to countering these perceived threats. A book written by Klaus Wah in the year 2000, The Radical Right, contrasts the radical right of the 1950s, which obtained influence during the Reagan administration, to the radical right of today, which has increasingly turned to violent acts beginning with the Oklahoma City bombing in 1995.

Wahl's book documents this evolution: "Ideologies of [today's] radical right emphasize social and economic threats in the modern and postmodern world (e.g., globalization, immigration). The radical right also promises protection against such threats by an emphatic ethnic construction of 'we', the people, as a familiar, homogeneous in-group, anti-modern, or reactionary structures of family, society, an authoritarian state, nationalism, the discrimination, or exclusion of immigrants and other minorities ... While favoring traditional social and cultural structures (traditional family and gender roles, religion, etc.) the radical right uses modern technologies and it does not ascribe to a specific economic policy; some parties advocate a liberal, free-market policy, but other parties advocate a welfare state policy. Finally, the radical right can be scaled by using different degrees of militancy and aggressiveness from right-wing populism to racism, terrorism, and totalitarianism."

Ultra-right groups, as The Radical Right definition states, are normally called "far-right" groups, but they may also be called "radical right" groups. According to Clive Webb, "Radical right is commonly, but not exclusively used to describe anticommunist organizations such as the Christian Crusade and the John Birch Society... [T]he term far right ... is the label most broadly used by scholars ... to describe militant white supremacists." Cas Mudde describes the "radical right" as opposing "the checks and balances and rule of law of liberal democracy but nonetheless accepts the principle of popular sovereignty and majority rule"; whereas the extreme right "entirely rejects liberalism and democracy and calls for revolutionary violence". According to Olivier Burtin, by 2025, the term "far right" has eclipsed terms such as "right-wing populism" in the early 2000s, "radical right" in the 1990s, and "extreme right" in the 1980s.

== Sociological perspectives ==
=== McCarthyism ===
The study of the radical right began in the 1950s as social scientists attempted to explain McCarthyism, which was seen as a lapse from the American political tradition. A framework for description was developed primarily in The Pseudo-Conservative Revolt by the American historian Richard Hofstadter and The Sources of The "Radical Right" by Seymour Martin Lipset. These essays, along with others by Daniel Bell, Talcott Parsons, Peter Viereck and Herbert Hyman, were included in The New American Right (1955). In 1963, following the rise of the John Birch Society, the authors were asked to re-examine their earlier essays and the revised essays were published in the book The Radical Right. Lipset, along with Earl Raab, traced the history of the radical right in The Politics of Unreason (1970).

The central arguments of The Radical Right provoked criticism. Some on the Right thought that McCarthyism could be explained as a rational reaction to communism. Others thought McCarthyism should be explained as part of the Republican Party's political strategy. Critics on the Left denied that McCarthyism could be interpreted as a mass movement and rejected the comparison with 19th-century populism. Others saw status politics, dispossession and other explanations as too vague.

=== Paranoid-style politics ===
Two different approaches were taken by these social scientists. Richard Hofstadter wrote an analysis in his influential 1964 essay The Paranoid Style in American Politics. Hofstadter sought to identify the characteristics of the groups. Hofstadter defined politically paranoid individuals as feeling persecuted, fearing conspiracy, and acting over-aggressive yet socialized. Hofstadter and other scholars in the 1950s argued that the major left-wing movement of the 1890s, the Populists, showed what Hofstadter said was "paranoid delusions of conspiracy by the Money Power".

Historians have also applied the paranoid category to other political movements, such as the conservative Constitutional Union Party of 1860. Hofstadter's approach was later applied to the rise of new right-wing groups, including the Christian right and the Patriot movement.

== Current size ==
Political scientist Gary Jacobson gives an estimate of the "size of the extremist vote" as a fraction of Republican Party voters (there being essentially no right-wing extremists in the Democratic party), based on sympathizers as well as active supporters of the "Proud Boys, Oath Keepers, QAnon etc.". He points to survey data of Republicans who answered "yes" to questions such as whether they had a "favorable opinion of the people who invaded the Capitol on Jan. 6", thought it likely that Donald Trump would "be reinstated as president before the end of 2021", and whether it was "definitely true" that "top Democrats are involved in elite child sex-trafficking rings." Based on the results, which were stable over 2020–2022, he estimated that "20 to 25 percent of the Republican electorate can be considered extremists."

Soon after the assassination of Charlie Kirk, U.S. President Trump claimed that "the radicals on the left are the problem" with political violence. Opinion editors, as well as both far-right commentators and Trump critics, have compared Charlie Kirk's killing to the Reichstag fire—the 1933 arson of the German parliament building that Hitler used as a pretext to suspend civil liberties and prosecute political opposition—some calling Kirk's killing Trump's "Reichstag fire moment". How Democracies Die author, professor Steven Levitsky, said that exploiting Charlie Kirk's killing to justify unleashing attacks on critics is "page one of the authoritarian playbook".

== Social structure ==
Sociologists Lipset and Raab were focused on who joined these movements and how they evolved. They saw the development of radical right-wing groups as occurring in three stages. In the first stage certain groups came under strain because of a loss or threatened loss of power and/or status. In the second stage they theorize about what has led to this threat. In the third stage they identify people and groups whom they consider to be responsible. A successful radical right-wing group would be able to combine the anxieties of both elites and masses. European immigration for example threatened the elites because immigrants brought socialism and radicalism, while for the masses the threat came from their Catholicism. The main elements are low democratic restraint, having more of a stake in the past than the present and laissez-faire economics. The emphasis is on preserving social rather than economic status. The main population attracted are lower-educated, lower-income and lower-occupational strata. They were seen as having a lower commitment to democracy, instead having loyalty to groups, institutions and systems.

However, some scholars reject Lipset and Raab's analysis. James Aho, for example, says that the way individuals join right-wing groups is no different from how they join other types of groups. They are influenced by recruiters and join because they believe the goals promoted by the group are of value to them and find personal value in belonging to the group. Several scholars, including Sara Diamond and Chip Berlet, reject the theory that membership in the radical right is driven by emotionality and irrationality and see them as similar to other political movements. John George and Laird Wilcox see the psychological claims in Lipset and Raab's approach as "dehumanizing" of members of the radical right. They claim that the same description of members of the radical right is also true of many people within the political mainstream.

Richard Hofstadter found a common thread in the radical right, from fear of the Illuminati in the late 18th century, to anti-Catholic and anti-Masonic movements in the 19th to McCarthyism and the John Birch Society in the 20th. They were conspiracist, Manichean, absolutist and paranoid. They saw history as a conspiracy by a demonic force that was on the verge of total control, requiring their urgent efforts to stop it. Therefore, they rejected pluralistic politics, with its compromise and consensus-building. Hofstadter thought that these characteristics were always present in a large minority of the population. Frequent waves of status displacement would continually bring it to the surface.

D. J. Mulloy, however, noted that the term "extremist" is often applied to groups outside the political mainstream and the term is dropped once these groups obtain respectability, using the Palestine Liberation Organization as an example. The mainstream frequently ignores the commonality between itself and so-called extremist organizations. Also, the radical right appeals to views that are held by the mainstream: antielitism, individualism, and egalitarianism. Their views on religion, race, Americanism and guns are held by a significant proportion of other white Americans.

== Conspiracism ==
Throughout modern history, conspiracism has been a major feature of the radical right and subject to numerous books and articles, the most famous of which is Richard Hofstadter's essay The Paranoid Style in American Politics (1964). Imaginary threats have variously been identified as originating from American Catholics, non-whites, women, homosexuals, secular humanists, Mormons, Jews, Muslims, Hindus, Buddhists, American communists, Freemasons, bankers, and the U.S. government. Alexander Zaitchik, writing for the Southern Poverty Law Center (SPLC), credited cable news hosts, including Glenn Beck, Lou Dobbs, the John Birch Society, and WorldNetDaily with popularizing conspiracy theories. In the Fall 2010 issue of the SPLC's Intelligence Report, he identified the following as the top 10 conspiracy theories of the radical right:

1. Chemtrails
2. Martial Law
3. Federal Emergency Management Agency Concentration Camps
4. Foreign troops on US soil
5. Door-to-door gun confiscations
6. 9/11 as government plan
7. Population control
8. High Frequency Active Auroral Research Program (HAARP)
9. Federal Reserve
10. North American Union

Common to most of these theories is an overarching belief in the existence of New World Order intent on instituting a one-world, communist government. Climate change being viewed as a hoax is also sometimes associated with the radical right.

Since 2017, the QAnon conspiracy theory has been widely promulgated among fringe groups on the far-right.

During the COVID-19 pandemic, far-right leaders and influencers have promoted anti-vaccination rhetoric and conspiracy theories surrounding the pandemic.

== Right-wing populism ==
From the 1990s onward, parties that have been described as radical right became established in the legislatures of various democracies including Canada, Australia, Norway, France, Israel, Russia, Romania, and Chile, and they also entered coalition governments in Switzerland, Finland, Austria, the Netherlands, and Italy. However, there is little consensus about the reasons for this. Some of these parties had historic roots, such as the National Alliance, formed as the Italian Social Movement in 1946, the French National Front, founded in 1972, and the Freedom Party of Austria, an existing party that moved sharply to the right after 1986. Typically new right-wing parties, such as the French Poujadists, the U.S. Reform Party and the Dutch Pim Fortuyn List enjoyed short-lived prominence. The main support for these parties comes from both the self-employed and skilled and unskilled labor, with support coming predominantly from males.

However, scholars are divided on whether these parties are radical right, since they differ from the groups described in earlier studies of the radical right. They are more often described as populist. Studies of the radical right in the United States and right-wing populism in Europe have tended to be conducted independently, with very few comparisons made. European analyses have tended to use comparisons with fascism, while studies of the American radical right have stressed American exceptionalism. The U.S. studies have paid attention to the consequences of slavery, the profusion of religious denominations and a history of immigration, and saw fascism as uniquely European.

Although the term "radical right" was American in origin, the term has been consciously adopted by some European social scientists. Conversely the term "right-wing extremism", which is European in origin, has been adopted by some American social scientists. Since the European right-wing groups in existence immediately following the war had roots in fascism, they were normally called "neo-fascist". However, as new right-wing groups emerged with no connection to historical fascism, the use of the term "right-wing extremism" came to be more widely used.

Jeffrey Kaplan and Leonard Weinberg argued that the radical right in the U.S. and right-wing populism in Europe were the same phenomenon that existed throughout the Western world. They identified the core attributes as contained in extremism, behavior and beliefs. As extremists, they see no moral ambiguity and demonize the enemy, sometimes connecting them to conspiracy theories such as the New World Order. Given this worldview, there is a tendency to use methods outside democratic norms, although this is not always the case. The main core belief is inequality, which often takes the form of opposition to immigration or racism. They do not see this new Right as having any connection with the historic Right, which had been concerned with protecting the status quo. They also see the cooperation of the American and European forms, and their mutual influence on each other, as evidence of their existence as a single phenomenon.

Daniel Bell argues that the ideology of the radical right is "its readiness to jettison constitutional processes and to suspend liberties, to condone Communist methods in the fighting of Communism". Historian Richard Hofstadter agrees that communist-style methods are often emulated: "The John Birch Society emulates Communist cells and quasi-secret operation through 'front' groups, and preaches a ruthless prosecution of the ideological war along lines very similar to those it finds in the Communist enemy". He also quotes Barry Goldwater: "I would suggest that we analyze and copy the strategy of the enemy; theirs has worked and ours has not".

American historian Rick Perlstein argues that radical right issues, including populism, nativism, and authoritarianism—embodied by conspiracy-minded right-wing movements, such as the Black Legion, Charles Coughlin, the Christian Front, and "birther" speculation— have had more influence on mainstream conservatism than William F. Buckley's libertarian ideas of limited government, free trade and free market economics; or neoconservative ideas like pro-immigration and empire-building.

== History ==
=== Conspiracy theories ===
The American Patriots who spearheaded the American Revolution in the 1770s were motivated primarily by an ideology that historians call Republicanism. It stressed the dangers of aristocracy, as represented by the British government, corruption, and the need for every citizen to display civic virtue. When public affairs took a bad turn, Republicans were inclined to identify a conspiracy of evil forces as the cause.

Against this background of fear of conspiracies against American liberties the first Radical Right-style responses came in the 1790s. Some Federalists warned of an organized conspiracy involving Thomas Jefferson and his followers, and recent arrivals from Europe, alleging that they were agents of the French revolutionary agenda of violent radicalism, social equalitarianism and anti-Christian infidelity. The Federalists in 1798 acted by passing the Alien and Sedition Acts, designed to protect the country against both foreign and domestic radicals. Fear of immigration led to a riot in New York City in 1806 between nativists and Irishmen, which led to increased calls by Federalists to nativism.

=== Anti-Masonic Party ===
In America, public outrage against privilege and aristocracy in the United States was expressed in the Northeast by advocates of anti-Masonry, the belief that Freemasonry comprised powerful evil secret elites which rejected republican values and were blocking the movement toward egalitarianism and reform. The anti-Masons, with a strong evangelical base, organized into a political party, the Anti-Masonic Party that pledged to rid Masons from public office. It was most active in 1828–1836. The Freemason movement was badly damaged and never fully recovered; the Anti-Mason movement merged into the coalition that became the new Whig Party. The anti-Masonry movement was not "radical"; it fully participated in democracy, and was animated by the belief that the Masons were the ones subverting democracy in America. While earlier accounts of the antimasons portrayed their supporters as mainly poor people, more recent scholarship has shown that they were largely middle-class.

=== Nativism and xenophobia ===
The arrival of large numbers of Irish Catholic immigrants in the 1830s and 1840s led to a reaction among Americans, who were alarmed by the levels of crime and welfare dependency among the new arrivals, and the danger of political power in the hands of the Pope. This led to the organized Nativists and xenophobes. Nativists in New York formed the American Republican Party. It merged into the Know Nothings in the 1850s. The Know-Nothing activists and Irish Catholics fought a series of election-day confrontations especially in the 1856, with multiple injuries and a few deaths.

The Know Nothing party split over the issue of slavery and its northern wing merged into the Republican Party in the late 1850s.

=== White paramilitary organizations in the Southern United States ===
Starting in the 1870s and continuing through the late 19th century, numerous white supremacist paramilitary groups operated in the South, with the goal of intimidating African-American supporters of the Republican Party. Examples of such groups included the Red Shirts and the White League.

=== American Protective Association ===
In the Midwestern United States in 1887, the American Protective Association (APA) was formed by Irish Protestants from Canada who wanted to fight against the political power of Irish Catholic politicians. It was a secret organization with vastly exaggerated membership claims whose members campaigned for Protestant candidates in local elections and it opposed the hiring of Catholics for government jobs. The movement relied on forged documents and was rejected by mainstream Republicans. Anti-Catholicism was declining in America as the Catholics moved up the social ladder, and the APA quickly faded away in the mid-1890s.

=== Second Ku Klux Klan ===
The Second Ku Klux Klan, was formed in 1915 but grew very slowly until the early 1920s. It combined Protestant fundamentalism and moralism with right-wing extremism. Its major support came from the urban south, the midwest and the Pacific Coast. While the Klan initially drew upper middle class support, its bigotry and violence alienated these members and it came to be dominated by less educated and poorer members. Then entrepreneurs took it over as a cash machine whereby well-paid state and local organizers formed a local chapter and collected initiation fees, while the national office sold expensive white robes with masks. The organizers collected the money and moved on, leaving locals with weak leadership. Once the state leaders were exposed as frauds in the mid-1920s, the KKK collapsed rapidly. Organizers promised membership would be secret, and appealed to Anti-Catholicism as well as hostility to Jews and African Americans. Protestant fundamentalists were the main recruits, along with poorly educated men. The Klan organizers claimed that Catholics were controlled by the Pope. They supported prohibition and public schools. The Klan was anti-elitist and it also attacked "the intellectuals", seeing itself as the egalitarian defender of the common man. The Klan was denounced by the Republicans, but the Democrats split bitterly on a proposal to denounce the Klan in 1924.

=== Great Depression ===
During the Great Depression in the United States there were several popular new movements. On the left the largest by far was Huey Long's Share Our Wealth, which attacked capitalism and was expanding from its base in Louisiana when Long was assassinated. On the right the most important was Father Coughlin.

==== Father Coughlin ====
Charles Coughlin (Father Coughlin) was a Catholic priest who immigrated from Canada to Detroit and began broadcasting on religious matters in 1926. When his program went national in 1930, he began to comment on political issues, promoting a left-wing attack that was highly critical of American capitalists. By 1932 he had millions of regular listeners. He supported Franklin D. Roosevelt in 1932 and promoted the early New Deal. He broke with Roosevelt in 1935 on foreign policy. Coughlin then denounced the New Deal, which he claimed had accomplished little but instead had strengthened the position of the bankers.

In 1934 he set up the "National Union for Social Justice", as a network of local clubs he would control. The National Union never flourished and it closed in 1936. Instead he endorsed the left-wing presidential campaign of William Lemke, who campaigned on the Union Party ticket, as a new third party. Lemke was also supported by Gerald L. K. Smith, head of the remnants of the Share Our Wealth movement and Dr. Francis Townsend, head of the left-wing Townsend Old Age movement. In the election, however, Lemke received fewer than 900,000 votes.

After 1936 Coughlin used his radio show and magazine to push America far to the right. He endorsed the fascism of Mussolini's Italy and Hitler's Nazi Germany. At home he attacked labor unions and liberal politicians for being pro-Communist. He called for a corporate state and setting up "Social Justice Councils", which excluded non-Christians from their membership. His magazine, Social Justice, named Benito Mussolini as man of the year in 1938 and defended Hitler's "persecution" of Jews, whom he linked with Communism. Major radio stations then refused to air his broadcasts and the Post Office banned Social Justice from the mails in 1942 after the U.S. entered World War II. The previous Catholic archbishop of Detroit had defended Coughlin but the new archbishop ordered him to cease his political activities and radio broadcasts. Coughlin did so and retired from political life.

==== Smaller fringe groups ====
The Black Legion, which had a peak membership of 40,000 was formed by former Klansmen and operated in Indiana, Ohio and Michigan. Unlike the Klan, its members dressed in black and its organizational hierarchy was based on the organizational hierarchy of the military, not on the organizational hierarchy of fraternal organizations. Its members swore an oath to keep "the secrets of the order to support God, the United States Constitution, and the Black Legion in its holy war against Catholics, Jews, Communists, Negroes, and aliens". The organization went into decline after more than fifty members were convicted of various crimes in support of the organization. The typical member was from a small farm in the South, lacked a high school graduation diploma, was married with children and worked in unskilled labor.

Gerald B. Winrod, a fundamentalist Christian minister who founded the Defenders of the Christian Faith revived the Illuminati conspiracy theory that was originally introduced into the United States in 1798. He claimed that the French and Russian Revolutions were both directed by the Illuminati and he also claimed that the Protocols of the Elders of Zion was an accurate expose of a Jewish conspiracy. He believed that the Jews, the Catholics, the communists and the bankers were all working together and plotting to destroy American Protestantism. Although Winrod's appeal was mainly limited to rural, poor, uneducated fundamentalist Christians, his magazine The Defender reached a peak circulation of 100,000 in the late 1930s.

William Dudley Pelley's Silver Shirts movement was overtly modelled on European fascism and introduced a populist statist plan for economic organization. The United States would be reorganized as a corporation, with individuals paid according to their contributions, although African Americans, aboriginals and aliens would be treated as wards of the state and therefore hold a lower status. The organization blamed the Jews for the depression, communism, and the spread of immorality, but it openly accepted Catholics as members. Its membership was largely uneducated, poor and elderly, with a high proportion of neurotics, and it also had a large female membership. Its main base of support was in small communities in the Midwest and on the West Coast, and it had almost no presence in the Southern States.

=== McCarthyism ===
Although the United States emerged from the Second World War as the world's most powerful country economically and militarily, communism had also been strengthened. Communism had spread in Eastern Europe and southeast Asia, and there were numerous Communist insurgencies. At the same time, Communist espionage had been found in the U.S. Responding to the fears the new enemy presented, Joe McCarthy, a Republican U.S. senator from Wisconsin, claimed in 1950 that there were 205 Communist spies in the State Department. The main target of McCarthyism, however, was ideological nonconformism, and individuals were targeted for their beliefs. Black lists were established in many industries restricting the employment of suspected nonconformists, and libraries were pressured to remove books and periodicals that were considered suspect. McCarthy investigated Voice of America and although no communists were found, 30 employees were fired as a result. The strongest support for McCarthyism came from some of the German and Irish Catholics, who had been isolationist in both world wars, had an anti-British bias, and opposed socialism on ostensibly religious grounds. Catholic support was far from uniform, and many Catholics were actively opposed to McCarthy and his methods. Much of the hostility was directed against the Eastern elites. Following the GOP landslide in 1952, McCarthy continued his investigations into the new Republican administration until the Republican party turned against him.

=== John Birch Society ===
The John Birch Society, created in 1958, combined economic liberalism with anti-communism. The founder, Robert Welch Jr., believed that the greatest enemy of man was government, and the more extensive the government, the greater the enemy. To him, government was inherently corrupt and a threat to peace. He advocated private institutions, local government and rigid individualism.

=== American Independent Party ===
The 1968 presidential campaign of George Wallace created a new party called the American Independent Party (AIP) which in later years came under the control of Radical Right elements. In 1969, the party had split into two groups, the anti-communist American Party under the leadership of T. Coleman Andrews and another group under the AIP founder Bill Shearer. Both groups opposed federal intervention into schools, favored police suppression of domestic disorder and victory in the Vietnam War. The two groups united under the American Party banner in order to support the 1972 presidential campaign of George Wallace, but after he withdrew they nominated U.S. Representative John G. Schmitz.

=== Constitutional militia and patriot movements ===
Although small militias had existed throughout the latter half of the 20th century, the groups became more popular during the early 1990s, after a series of standoffs between armed citizens and federal government agents, such as the 1992 Ruby Ridge siege and 1993 Waco Siege. These groups expressed concern for what they perceived as government tyranny within the United States and generally held libertarian and constitutionalist political views, with a strong focus on the Second Amendment gun rights and tax protest. They also embraced many of the same conspiracy theories as predecessor groups on the radical right, particularly the New World Order theory. Currently active examples of such groups are the 3 Percenters and the Oath Keepers. A minority of militia groups, such as Posse Comitatus and the Aryan Nations, were white nationalists and saw militia and patriot movements as a form of white resistance against what they perceived to be a liberal and multiculturalist government. In the 21st century, militia and patriot organizations were notably involved in the 2014 Bundy standoff, the 2016 Occupation of the Malheur National Wildlife Refuge, and in the 2021 United States Capitol attack.

=== Paleoconservatism ===
Paul Gottfried first coined the term paleoconservatism in the 1980s. These conservatives stressed (post-Cold War) non-interventionist foreign policy, strict immigration law, anti-consumerism and traditional values and opposed the neoconservatives, who had more liberal views on these issues. The paleoconservatives used the surge in right-wing populism during the early 1990s to propel the presidential campaigns of Pat Buchanan in 1992, 1996 and 2000. They diminished in number after the September 11 attacks, where they found themselves at odds with the vast majority of American conservatives on how to respond to the threat of terrorism.

=== Counter-jihad ===
In the aftermath of the September 11 attacks in 2001, the Counter-jihad movement, supported by groups such as Stop Islamization of America and individuals such as Frank Gaffney and Pamela Geller, began to gain traction among the American right. They were widely dubbed "islamophobic" for their vocal condemnation of the Islamic religion and their belief that Muslims who were living in America posed a significant threat to it. They believed that the United States was under threat from "Islamic supremacism", accusing the Council on American-Islamic Relations and even accusing prominent conservatives like Suhail A. Khan and Grover Norquist of supporting Islamist groups such as the Muslim Brotherhood.

=== Minuteman Project ===
Jim Gilchrist, a conservative Republican, founded the Minuteman Project in April 2005. The Minutemen, inspired by the earlier Patriot movement and the original revolutionary Minutemen, advocated greater restrictions on illegal immigration and in the Southwestern United States, they engaged in volunteer activities and directed them against people who they believed were illegal immigrants. The group drew much criticism from people whose views on the immigration issues were more liberal, and President George W. Bush condemned them as "vigilantes". The Minuteman Project was similar to the earlier Ranch Rescue organization, which played a very similar role.

=== Alt-right ===
The alt-right emerged during the 2016 U.S. presidential election cycle in support of the Donald Trump presidential campaign. It draws influences from paleoconservatism, paleolibertarianism, White nationalism, the manosphere, the Dark Enlightenment, identitarianism, and the neoreactionary movement, and it differs from previous radical right-wing movements due to its heavy internet presence on sites such as 4chan.

=== Groypers ===
Groypers, sometimes called the Groyper Army, are a group of White nationalist and far-right activists who are notable for their attempts to introduce far-right politics into mainstream conservatism in the United States. The group is led by the far-right political commentator Nick Fuentes.

=== Trumpism ===
Politically motivated murders, cumulatively since 1975

Politically motivated murders, annually since 1990

Most extremist killings in the US have been caused by right-wing perpetrators. According to the Anti-Defamation League (ADL), all 61 extremist killings in the U.S. between 2022 and 2024 were committed by right-wing extremists. Over decades, right wing ideologically motivated homicides have substantially outnumbered those perpetrated by left wing perpetrators in the US. Also, far-right motivated homicides have occurred much more frequently than jihadi violence inspired by Islamic extremism (not shown in chart). Soon after the September 2025 assassination of Charlie Kirk, U.S. President Trump claimed that "the radicals on the left are the problem" with political violence. Opinion editors, as well as both far-right commentators and Trump critics, have compared Charlie Kirk's killing to the Reichstag fire—the 1933 arson of the German parliament building that Hitler used as a pretext to suspend civil liberties and prosecute political opposition—some calling Kirk's killing Trump's "Reichstag fire moment". How Democracies Die author, professor Steven Levitsky, said that exploiting Charlie Kirk's killing to justify unleashing attacks on critics is "page one of the authoritarian playbook".

In October 2026, Last Week Tonight with John Oliver released an episode about the far-right in the United States, arguing previously-extreme groups (such as Groypers and neo-Nazis) had become mainstream in the MAGA movement and were likely to be the successors of MAGA ideology.

== Notable organizations ==
- Three Percenters (2008–2021)
- American Freedom Party (2009–present)
- Oath Keepers (2009–present)
- Proud Boys (2016–present)
- Patriot Prayer (2016–present)
- Groypers (2019–present)

== See also ==
- American militia movement
- Christian Identity
- Christian nationalism
- Crypto-fascism
- Domestic terrorism in the United States
- Fascism in the United States
- Hate crime laws in the United States
- Manosphere
- Nativism in United States politics
- Nazism in the Americas
- Para-fascism
- Patriot movement
- Radical right (Europe)
- Redemption movement
- Right-wing terrorism
- Trumpism
- White nationalism in the United States
- Wingnut (politics)
- Xenophobia in the United States

== Works cited ==
- Berlet, Chip. Lyons, Matthew Nemiroff. Right-wing populism in America: too close for comfort. New York, NY: Guilford Press, 2000 ISBN 1572305622
- Courser, Zachary. "The Tea 'Party' as a Conservative Social Movement". In SYMPOSIUM: THE FUTURE OF SOCIAL CONSERVATISM, Published online, Springer Science Media, LLC 2011
- Davies, Peter. Lynch, Derek. The Routledge companion to fascism and the far right. London: Routledge, 2002. ISBN 0415214947
- Diamond, Sara. Roads to dominion: right-wing movements and political power in the United States. New York: Guilford Press, 1995 ISBN 0898628644
- Hofstadter, Richard. The Paranoid Style in American Politics (2008 edition), reprints famous essays from 1963 to 1964
- Ignazi, Piero. "The extreme right: defining the object and assessing the causes" inn Martin Schain, Aristide R. Zolberg, Patrick Hossay (Eds.), Shadows over Europe: the development and impact of the extreme right in Western Europe. New York: Palgrave Macmillan, 2002. ISBN 0312295936
- Kaplan, Jeffrey and Weinberg, Leonard. The emergence of a Euro-American radical right. NJ: Rutgers University Press, 1998 ISBN 0813525640
- Lipset, Seymour Martin. "The sources of the "Radical Right". In Daniel Bell (Ed.), The radical right, Volume 2000. New Brunswick, NJ: Transaction Publishers, 2002 ISBN 0765807491
- Lipset, Seymour Martin. Raab, Earl. The Politics of Unreason: Right-Wing Extremism in America, 1790–1970. New York: Harper & Row, 1970 ISBN
- Mulloy, D. J. American extremism: history, politics and the militia movement. London: Routledge, 2004 ISBN 0-415-32674-5
- Norris, Pippa, "The Right in Elections" Paper in APSA Panel 36–15 at the Annual Meeting of the American Political Science Association, 2004, Chicago.
- Plotke, David. "Introduction to the Transaction edition: the success and anger of the modern American Right". In Daniel Bell (Ed.), The radical right, Volume 2000. New Brunswick, NJ: Transaction Publishers, 2002 ISBN 0765807491
- Webb, Clive. Rabble rousers: the American far right in the civil rights era. Athens, GA: University of Georgia Press, 2010 ISBN 0820327646
- Zaitchick, "'Patriot' Paranoia: A Look at the Top Ten Conspiracy Theories", Intelligence Report, Fall 2010, Issue Number: 139
