= American Forces =

American Forces usually refers to:

- Military of the United States

It may also refer to:

- Various American Christian militia movements, such as:
  - Christian Patriot movement
  - Christian Identity
  - Constitutional militia movement
- American Forces, a fictional military organization in the 1998 movie Soldier
