= Insurrectionist theory =

Political theory

"Insurrectionist Theory" is a belief system that took shape in the United States, often relating to the Second Amendment to the U.S. Constitution, that highlights the argument supporting the right to bear arms. Simply stated, it is a proposition arguing that “the possession of firearms by individuals serves as the ultimate check on the power of government”. Its proponents assert a right of revolution, which entails armed revolt premised on resistance against a perceived tyrannical government. The theory holds that individuals should bears arms as a "check" on the power of the government, invoking the constitutional concept of "consent of the governed". This theory is not accepted in American jurisprudence or case law, but relates to many popularly held American values about sovereignty and has roots in the anti-monarchical character of the founding of the United States. This theory is often associated with the American militia movement and other anti-governmental groups.

== Terminology ==
Followers of this theory believe that civilians should have nearly unlimited access to weapons and the ability to keep private arms as a check on governmental power. Insurrectionist theory applies primarily to gun owners who arm themselves against perceived governmental tyranny to resist (or overthrow) it.

Insurrectionist theory can be divided into two components:

- Individuals should keep arms and armor as a check on government tyranny.
- Individuals have a duty to act against tyranny with arms.

It differs from the right of revolution, maintaining that individuals should be armed in the absence of a tyrannical government and should oppose any governmental attempt to regulate firearms. The right of revolution advocates rebelling against a government which is actively working against common interests or threatening public safety.

== History ==
=== Philosophical views ===
==== John Locke ====
In his Two Treatises of Government, John Locke wrote that governments are instituted among men for the protection of life, liberty, and property. Locke believed that a social contract existed when governments upheld those protections and people consented to governance. If a government becomes tyrannical (violating the social contract), Locke said that the people were no longer bound by the contract and could revolt to regain their rights:

Whenever the Legislators endeavor to take away, and destroy the Property of the People, or to reduce them to Slavery under Arbitrary Power, they put themselves into a state of War with the People, who are thereupon absolved from any farther Obedience, and are left to the common Refuge, which God hath provided for all Men, against Force and Violence. Whensoever therefore the Legislative shall transgress this fundamental Rule of Society; and either by Ambition, Fear, Folly or Corruption, endeavor to grasp themselves, or put into the hands of any other an Absolute Power over the Lives, Liberties, and Estates of the People; By this breach of Trust they forfeit the Power, the People had put into their hands, for quite contrary ends, and it devolves to the People, who have a Right to resume their original Liberty.

To further the fundamental rights to life, liberty, and property, Locke supported the individual right to gun ownership for personal defense and against government tyranny. He did not consider this right unlimited, however, and believed that a government has the right to enact laws for the common good.

==== Thomas Jefferson ====
Thomas Jefferson was supportive of rebellion to prevent tyranny, writing "The tree of liberty must be refreshed from time to time with the blood of patriots and tyrants." and "I hold it that a little rebellion now and then is a good thing, and as necessary in the political world as storms in the physical." His beliefs were in line with the anti-Federalist fears of his era, opposing Federalist Party ideals which sought to increase the power of the federal government. Anti-Federalists believed that a strong central government would lead to the regulation of firearms and a large national military which could oppress the people.

== In modern American right-wing politics ==
Insurrectionist theory has regained some popularity in recent years with the rise of the American militia movement, a far-right movement that is part of the Radical right (United States) composing of a variety of groups which oppose the Federal government. These groups assert that they are carrying on the tradition of the American founding fathers, often claiming to organize for the purpose of "checking" or "resisting" the power of a tyrannical government. From around 2019 to 2022, the Boogaloo boys movement made waves with their aggressive stance of advocating for a second civil war or an armed revolution.

=== Extremist groups ===
Adherents often are associated with anti-governmental extremist organizations, some with far-right standings, such as the III%ers, Boogaloo Movement, Oath Keepers, and Light foot militias, often under the umbrella of the American militia movement. Since the first presidency of Donald Trump, some—predominantly the Three Percenters and the Boogaloo movement—are associated with domestic terrorism incidents such as Gretchen Whitmer kidnapping plot, the 2021 storming of the United States Capitol, and antigovernmental standoffs such as the Bundy standoff and the Occupation of the Malheur National Wildlife Refuge.
