= KTTL =

Radio station in Dodge City, Kansas (1977–1986)

KMCS
- Dodge City, Kansas; United States
- Frequency: 93.9 MHz

Ownership
- Owner: Cattle Country Broadcasting

History
- First air date: December 13, 1977
- Last air date: 1986
- Former call signs: KTTL (1977–1984)

Technical information
- Facility ID: 9410
- ERP: 100,000 watts
- HAAT: 566 feet (173 m)
- Transmitter coordinates: 37°38′28″N 100°20′40″W

KTTL, known as KMCS from 1984, was a radio station in Dodge City, Kansas, broadcasting to southwest Kansas on 93.9 FM from 1977 to 1986. The station was owned by Cattle Country Broadcasting, a business of Charles and Nellie Babbs. In 1983, racist remarks on religious programs broadcast over country-formatted KTTL and connections to the Posse Comitatus movement led to state and national backlash against the station; after relaunching the station as a contemporary hit radio outlet under the KMCS call letters and having its license renewal designated for hearing, Charles Babbs settled the hearing by agreeing not to pursue a renewal of KMCS's license.

== History ==
In 1975, Charles and Nellie Babbs filed a construction permit for a new radio station in Dodge City and emerged the winners of a comparative hearing two years later after the owners of KEDD radio dropped out of the proceeding. The new, 100,000-watt station went on the air as country-formatted KTTL on December 13, 1977, bringing Dodge City its second commercial FM station and fourth overall.

=== National attention ===
Several years after signing on, KTTL attracted national attention. In addition to six hours a week of farm programs as well as a daily "swap shop" show and several religious programs, KTTL aired programs from William P. Gale of the "National Identity Broadcast" and James Wickstrom, founder of the Posse Comitatus organization. Wickstrom boasted that "every rabbi in Los Angeles will die in 24 hours" if his antisemitic demands were not met, while other programs called Catholics "pagans" and "idol worshippers" and used the word "nigger" to describe African Americans, saying they were from "bongo bongo land". Vietnamese people and Mexicans, as well as politicians, were also targets of Gale and Wickstrom's programs.

The Babbses had views that were in line with these programs: in 1983, when interviewed by a news service reporter, Charles claimed that "the white man is supposed to protect the other races" and called the Federal Reserve System "the Jew-controlled money standard". The Babbses' rejection of the government-assigned value of money resulted in them refusing to pay their 1981 property taxes to Gray County, where its transmitter tower was located; advertisers fled as they were garnished for the station's actions. In addition, when Nellie Babbs was interviewed by KAKE-TV and claimed that Rosanne Cash had antisemitic views, Cash sued for $3 million, saying she was erroneously quoted.

The content of these taped programs prompted KGNO, one of KTTL's competitors in Dodge City, to editorialize against the programs of KTTL, calling them "crap". This resulted in a significant amount of mail to Robert Stephan, the Attorney General of Kansas, and in a letter from Senator Bob Dole to the FCC. Politicians weighed in in the House of Representatives; when Nellie Babbs appeared before a subcommittee hearing on deregulation in August 1983, Ed Markey scolded her.

=== Competing applications and sale attempt ===
KTTL's license came up for renewal in 1983; two groups filed petitions to deny, including the National Black Media Coalition and Dodge City Citizens for Better Broadcasting, while there were three informal objections (one of them from Stephan) and a competing application from Community Service Broadcasting, Inc. Local residents also claimed that KTTL had broadcast out-of-date weather reports and failed to offer advertising time. After dropping the Gale and Wickstrom broadcasts early in 1983, the programs returned to KTTL in late September, with one edition calling President Ronald Reagan a "Communist". That October, inspectors from the Federal Communications Commission's field office in Kansas City visited the station; fearful of potential violence and with rumors swirling that the station's facilities held weapons and barbed wire, the inspectors coordinated with local law enforcement officials, though ultimately there was no opposition. The inspection revealed several technical violations, which Nellie Babbs owed to the fact that her husband—the engineer—had left the family suddenly the previous month and taken equipment with him. Opponents of the station feared retribution; some refused to file petitions to deny, while six local residents involved in competing applications were injured on a rural highway, their car having been run off the road at night, in what was deemed a suspicious accident.

With the station's legal future in limbo, Charles Babbs found a buyer: Van Smith, an attorney from Garden City and former owner of an AM-FM pair in that city, who under an application filed at the end of May 1983 was to buy KTTL for $450,000. By the time of the Smith sale attempt, a local bank—Fidelity State Bank and Trust, which also was KTTL's lender—was the lone advertiser on the station, the others having been scared away by the racist remarks or the garnishments.

=== Relaunch as KMCS and closure ===
1984 saw the relaunch of the beleaguered station as a contemporary hit radio outlet under the call letters KMCS, "The Max"; the new call letters went into effect on October 22, 1984. As KMCS, the station was live instead of automated. By this time, Nellie Babbs had moved to Missouri and was no longer involved in the radio station's operations.

In April 1985, the FCC unanimously found that, despite the "reprehensible" 264 hours of Gale and Wickstrom broadcasts aired over KTTL, hate speech was protected and could not be used as a factor in denying the station a license. Despite denying the petitions to deny, the commission voted to send the license into comparative hearing with Community Service's competing application, and the FCC directed commission staff to look into other factors, such as the character qualifications of the station's owners, in the proceeding. Other issues to be considered in the hearing were the station's failure to keep program logs and illegally operating a mobile service common carrier, even after receiving a cease-and-desist order from the state of Kansas. Later in 1985, the Babbs divorced, with Charles receiving full ownership of Cattle Country. Additionally, it was reported that Broadcast Music, Inc. was investigating KMCS over unpaid royalties for songs.

In August 1986, Community Service Broadcasting, the competing applicant, proposed a deal by which Charles Babbs would drop his bid to renew KMCS's license in exchange for $10,000 and the FCC would grant the group a new construction permit for a new license to operate 93.9 FM; this application was supported by FCC staff and approved by the Commission's administrative law judge, leading to the end of KMCS and the award of a new construction permit to Community Service. However, the permit did not come to air immediately due to technical problems; after more than 11 years and two sales, the new 93.9 license, KRPH (now KZRD), signed on early in 1998.

=== Free speech issues ===
In a 1942 case National Broadcasting Co. v. United States the United States Supreme Court ruled as follows:

If that be so, it would follow that every person whose application for a license to operate a station is denied by the Commission is thereby denied his constitutional right of free speech. Freedom of utterance is abridged to many who wish to use the limited facilities of the radio. Unlike other modes of expression, radio inherently is not available to all. That is its unique characteristic, and that is why, unlike other modes of expression, it is subject to governmental regulation. Because it cannot be used by all, some who wish to use it must be denied.
