= Patriot movement =

American right-wing political movement

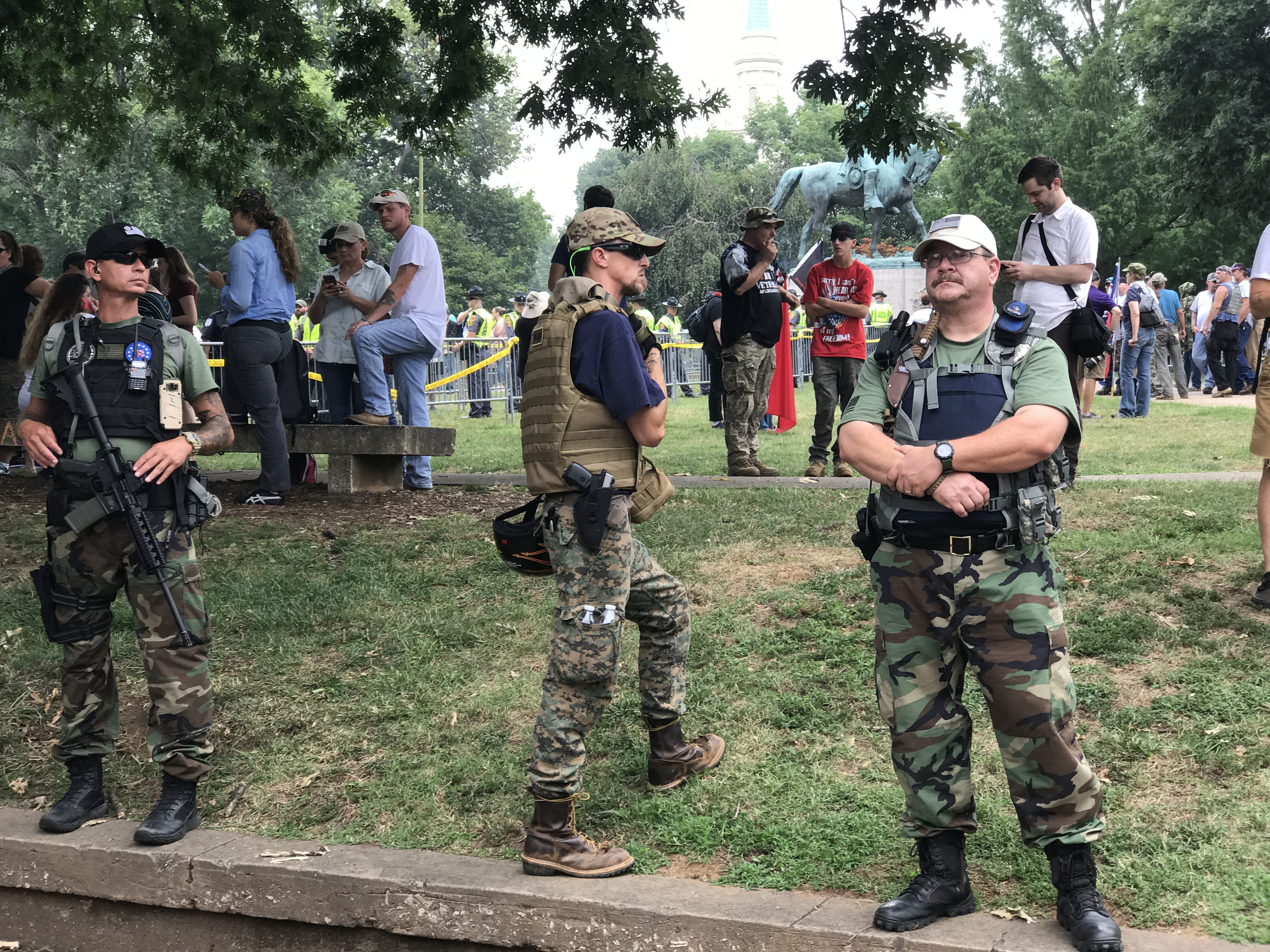
Three Percenters patrol Emancipation Park in Charlottesville, Virginia, during the 2017 Unite the Right rally.

In the United States, the patriot movement is a conglomeration of non-unified right wing populist and nationalist political movements, most notably right-wing armed militias, sovereign citizens, and tax protesters. Ideologies held by patriot movement groups often focus on anti-government conspiracy theories, with the SPLC describing a common belief that "despise the federal government and/or question its legitimacy." The movement first emerged in 1994 in response to what members saw as "violent government repression" of dissenting groups, along with increased gun control and the Clinton administration.

Several groups within the patriot movement have committed or endorsed violence, with U.S. law enforcement agencies labeling some groups "dangerous, delusional and sometimes violent." The ADL and The American Scientific Affiliation has noted that groups often have connections to white supremacy, however, their connections to it have shrunk over time due to their recent inclusion of non-white members. Major events in America which alarm or inspire the patriot movement include the 1992 Ruby Ridge siege, the 1993 Waco siege and the 1995 Oklahoma City Bombing. The Southern Poverty Law Center (SPLC) found that the economic decline and nomination of Barack Obama in 2008 caused the movement to "come roaring back", after declining from 800 groups in 1996 to less than 150 groups in 2000.

== History ==
Historians of the patriot movement identify its origins in the 1980s American farm crisis. As various policies combined to drive farmers deeply into debt, groups on the margins of American politics engaged rural communities with a range of conspiracy theory literature that drew on existing traditions of antisemitism, nativism and paleoconservatism. The Posse Comitatus, the Liberty Lobby and Lyndon LaRouche were prominent in these campaigns which informed and shaped the ideology of the movement that emerged. In the early 1990s, the patriot movement saw a surge of growth spurred by the confrontations at Ruby Ridge and Waco. The 1995 Oklahoma City bombing was carried out by two patriot movement members, Timothy McVeigh and Terry Nichols. During the 1990s the movement organized using "gun shows and the Internet". The movement was highly active in the mid-1990s and at a peak in 1996, contained around 800 separate groups. It saw decline in the late 1990s.

In 2009, the SPLC expressed concern about a resurgent patriot movement, and the Department of Homeland Security issued a report warning of heightened "Rightwing Extremism". The SPLC attributed this growth to "an angry backlash against non-white immigration and ... the economic meltdown and the Presidency of Barack Obama." It reported the growth of patriot groups with an increase from 149 in 2008, to 824 in 2010, to 1,274 in 2011 and 1,360 in 2012. According to the SPLC, the "explosive growth seems to have been driven by the election of our first black president and the approaching loss of a white majority in the U.S. that he represents. Another driver is the crash of the economy, which coincided neatly with the rise to national power of President Obama."

The SPLC found that while "there are many people" in the patriot movement "that aren't engaged in illegal activity," the "normalizing of conspiracy theories"—such as the belief that the Federal Emergency Management Agency (FEMA) is building concentration camps; rumors of covert plans by Mexico to reconquer the American Southwest; and the anxiety Sharia law might become part of the U.S. court system—has played into the growth of the groups. An extremist member of the patriot movement carried out the 2009 anti-abortion murder of George Tiller, and some extremists within the movement also have expressed support for Joseph Stack's 2010 plane crash into an Internal Revenue Service office. The movement was connected to and received a boost in profile from the 2014 Bundy standoff and 2016 occupation of the Malheur National Wildlife Refuge. Two members of the movement, Jerad Miller and Amanda Miller, killed two police officers and a civilian during a violent shooting rampage in Las Vegas after leaving the Bundy standoff; they pinned a note to one of their victims saying "This is the beginning of the revolution."

== Views ==
Various patriot movement aligned groups have frequently been described as racist, xenophobic, extremist, antisemitic, anti-Islam, anti-immigrant, and violent by groups such as the SPLC, ADL, and the FBI.

Descriptions of the patriot movement include:

- A diverse movement which has as its common thread its growing dissatisfaction with and alienation from government, the willingness to use military force in defense of its rights, and, in some groups, a conspiratorial eschatology;
- A brand of politics historically associated with paleoconservatives, paleolibertarians, militia groups, anti-immigration advocates, and those who argue for the abolition of the Federal Reserve;
- A movement outspoken regarding the U.S. Constitution, particularly the Second and Fourteenth Amendments; as a result, some members refuse to pay their income taxes, and some groups operate their own common-law legal system.

Additionally, the patriot movement has been associated with the following views:

- Support of the paramilitary militia movement, such as the Michigan Militia
- Eschatology; religious views which are focused on finding "signs of the end of times"
- Suspicion regarding surveillance

Elements of the patriot movement have expressed support for various conspiracy theories:

- QAnon conspiracy theories
- 9/11 conspiracy theories
- Federal government involvement in the Oklahoma City bombing (Convicted bomber Timothy McVeigh was "heavily involved in the patriot movement" and the bombing was modeled after one of the missions in William Pierce's white supremacist novel The Turner Diaries, "one of McVeigh's favorite books".)
- Federal government involvement in the John F. Kennedy assassination
- A New World Order, possibly in the form of a United Nations takeover.

In addition to the militia movement, which is said to have come out of the patriot movement, the patriot movement is often associated with the sovereign citizen movement, whose adherents believe that most US laws are illegitimate and do not apply to them.

== Groups ==
Groups identifying with the movement include:

- Idaho Light Foot Militia
- Militia of Montana
- Michigan Militia

== See also ==
- American militia movement
- Christian fascism, a form of clerical fascism
- Christian fundamentalism
- Christian Identity
- Christian nationalism
- Christian Patriot movement
- Christian terrorism, a form of religious terrorism
- Political violence in the United States
  - Radicalism in the United States
    - Radical right
      - Tea Party movement
- Terrorism in the United States
  - Domestic terrorism in the United States
