= Montana Freemen =

Anti-government Christian Patriot militia

The Montana Freemen were an anti-government Christian Patriot militia based outside the town of Jordan, Montana, United States. The members of the group referred to their land as "Justus Township" and had declared their leaders and followers "sovereign citizens" no longer under the authority of any outside government. They became the center of public attention in 1996 when they engaged in a prolonged armed standoff with agents of the Federal Bureau of Investigation (FBI).

== Ideology ==
The Montana Freemen, who were direct ideological descendants of the Posse Comitatus movement, espoused the doctrine of individual sovereignty and based on this belief, they rejected the authority of the federal government of the United States. On March 2, 1995, William Stanton, a Garfield County rancher, became the first Montana resident ever to be convicted of terrorism; District Judge Kenneth Wilson sentenced Stanton to 10 years in prison (the maximum penalty) for using violence for political ends. The following day, four armed men who styled themselves the "Garfield County Freemen" were arrested when they entered the Musselshell County Courthouse and tried to file papers protesting the seizure of Rodney Skurdal's house by the Internal Revenue Service.

== Liens ==
The Freemen, led by LeRoy M. Schweitzer, used among other things Anderson on the Uniform Commercial Code and Bankers Handbook to draw notices of lien against public officials. The liens were then allegedly sold to generate equity to fund an effort to make a "firm offer to pay off the national debt." The Freemen claimed that the liens conformed to the Uniform Commercial Code and that their township's court had an interest in a tort claim for damages incurred by the named public officials for violations of their oaths of office. They also claimed that support of the corporate credit system was an unconstitutional and corrupt act which has throughout the last half of the twentieth century "...[deprived the majority of Americans] of their property until [their] posterity wakes up homeless...", a paraphrased quotation attributed to Thomas Jefferson.

== Bank fraud ==
The Freemen were known to produce their own very realistic counterfeit checks and money orders, sometimes ordering items and deliberately overpaying so they could demand refunds. The president of one bank reported that over an 18-month period his bank received two to five complaints a week about Freemen checks. In 1995, members wrote a fraudulent check to try to purchase $1.4 million worth of firearms, ammunition, and bulletproof vests.

== Standoff ==
In late 1994, foreclosure proceedings were initiated against the farm that contained Justus Township. The Freemen refused to be evicted from the land. They had also conducted their own mock trials of numerous public officials, and issued their own writ of execution against a federal judge. The FBI investigated the group and initiated a sting operation aimed at one of the Freemen's financial programs, which led to the arrest of two members of the group in March 1996. The FBI also had warrants for eight other persons suspected to be at the farm, but before they were able to arrest them, an armed confrontation developed, and the FBI withdrew to a safe distance to avoid violence. The similar 1993 standoff in Waco, Texas, involving the Branch Davidians, as well as the 1992 incident between the Weaver family and the FBI at Ruby Ridge, Idaho, were still fresh in the public mind, and the FBI was extremely cautious and wanted to prevent a recurrence of those violent events.

In late April, political activist Bo Gritz was allowed by the FBI to enter Justus Township so he could try to negotiate a conclusion to the standoff. Gritz was accompanied by Randy Weaver, whom Gritz had convinced to surrender to the U.S. government during the Ruby Ridge standoff in 1992. However, the FBI refused to let Weaver enter the ranch. After holding five meetings over four days with the Freemen, Gritz left in frustration, commenting that the group had presented him with a mixture of religious and legal "mumbo-jumbo".

After 81 days of negotiations, the Freemen surrendered to authorities on June 14, 1996.

== Prison sentences ==
- LeRoy M. Schweitzer – 22 years. Died in federal prison on September 20, 2011, of natural causes, at age 73 years.
- Emmett Clark – Pleaded guilty and sentenced to time served plus 3 years under supervision.
- Richard Clark – 12 years.
- James Hance – 5 years, 7 months.
- Lavon T. Hanson – Pleaded guilty under plea bargain and sentenced to 1 year, 1 day.
- Dana Dudley Landers – Pleaded guilty and sentenced to 1 year, 9 months with credit for 2 years, 3 months already served.
- Russell Dean Landers – 11 years, 3 months; later extended by 15 years (see below). Died in prison on April 10, 2021, aged 69
- Daniel E. Peterson – 15 years (see below).

LeRoy Schweitzer was convicted of conspiracy, bank fraud, mail fraud, wire fraud, false claims to the IRS, interstate transportation of stolen property, threats against public officials, armed robbery of a television news crew, and firearms violations. He received a 22-year sentence for 25 convictions in a South Carolina federal prison. After Ervin Elbert Hurlbert and Donald Little, who identified themselves as "Montana Marshals", attempted to free Schweitzer from the prison, he was moved to the Administrative Maximum (ADX) facility at the Florence Federal Correctional Complex at Florence, Colorado, in 2006. Schweitzer died, aged 73, in ADX Florence on September 20, 2011.

On April 7, 2008, Russell Dean Landers's sentence was extended by 15 years for attempting to extort his release from prison. He and two other inmates at the federal prison in El Reno, Oklahoma, had demanded millions of dollars from prison officials for the use of their names, which they claimed were "copyrighted". They were found guilty of "conspiring to impede the duties of federal prison officials and extortion in (their) efforts to gain release from prison by making financial demands on prison staff and attempting to seize their property."

On April 6, 2010, Daniel E. Petersen was sentenced to serve additional time for filing bogus liens against three federal judges from prison, including the judge who had originally sentenced him to prison. In 1996, Petersen had been sentenced to 15 years in federal prison, after being convicted on 19 counts, including bank fraud and armed robbery. While he was serving his sentence in a federal prison in Minnesota, Petersen devised a scheme in which he would retaliate against those three judges. After an investigation, federal prosecutors found that Petersen had invented a company that supposedly held assets that included a $100 trillion default judgment against the United States. He then sold "shares" of the phony company to fellow inmates and others. He claimed that these shares were backed by "redemption certificates", which would be redeemed when the "judgment" was collected. The judgment which he referred to came from a self-created court, after then-Secretary of State Madeleine Albright declined to respond to his demands. He demanded $100 trillion, as well as $1 billion per day in interest, because he believed that the United States government was unlawfully confining him. Petersen followed up by filing liens against property which was owned by the three federal judges. He also offered bounties for the arrest of the same judges to facilitate their transport to Minnesota to respond to his liens.

Scott Roeder, convicted for the 2009 murder of physician and abortion provider George Tiller, was also reportedly involved with the Freemen.

A 2011 National Public Radio report stated that some of the people who were associated with the Montana Freemen were imprisoned in a highly restrictive Communication Management Unit.

== See also ==
- American militia movement
- False lien
- Militia of Montana
- Posse Comitatus
