= Nethercott =

Nethercott is a surname. Notable people with the surname include:

- Acer Nethercott (1977–2013), English rower
- Casey Nethercott, co-founder of Ranch Rescue, in the United States
- Ken Nethercott (1925–2007), English footballer
- Stuart Nethercott (born 1973), English footballer

== See also ==
- Nethercott, neighbourhood of Tackley, Oxfordshire, England
