= William Potter Gale =

Christian Identity advocate (1916–1988)

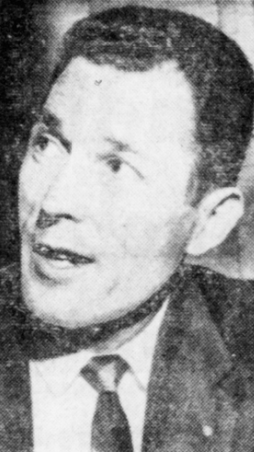
- Gale in 1960
- Born: November 20, 1916
- Died: April 28, 1988 (aged 71)

William Potter Gale (November 20, 1916 – April 28, 1988) was an American political activist who was involved with several white supremacist groups, including Christian Identity and the Posse Comitatus. He had connections to the Church of Jesus Christ–Christian, Aryan Nations, the sovereign citizen movement, and the militia movement.

== Early life and career ==
William Potter Gale was born on November 20, 1916, the fourth of five children of Charles Gale and Mary Agnes Potter. He was named after his maternal grandfather, William Potter. According to Gale's daughters in interviews with author Daniel Levitas after Gale's death, Charles Gale arrived in the United States in 1894, fleeing from the antisemitic pogroms and the economic instability which were occurring in the Russian Empire, changing his family's name from "Grabifker" to Gale. At the age of 18, Charles Gale lied about his age and place of birth in order to serve in the US Army, but he truthfully listed his ethnicity as "Hebrew" on his military enlistment papers. Charles abandoned Judaism, married a non-Jewish woman, and raised their children as Christians.

An Army Lieutenant Colonel, William Potter Gale served on General Douglas MacArthur's staff during World War II. After leaving the army, Gale became an Episcopalian minister, but he eventually founded his own church. He also joined the John Birch Society.

In 1964, he opened a securities firm in Glendale, California, and ran in the GOP primary for the 27th Congressional District without success.

== Beliefs ==
Gale was one of the few Christian Identity ministers to publish a doctrinal statement. He did this in a 1963 pamphlet titled The Faith of Our Fathers. His position was similar to that of Betrand Comparet.

== Activities and affiliations ==
Along with associates, Gale founded the California Rangers in the 1960s. The Rangers were registered as a civil defense group, although the Anti Defamation League (ADL) has listed them as a paramilitary tax resistance group. According to his own account, he was involved in the founding of the Christian Defense League (CDL) along with S. J. Capt sometime between 1957 and 1962.

In 1964, American Nazi Party leader George Lincoln Rockwell told the FBI that Gale had been part of an alleged conspiracy by right-wing former U.S. military officers to overthrow the federal government.

Having been introduced to Wesley Swift by S. J. Capt in 1956, Gale was involved in Swift's Church of Jesus Christ–Christian along with recognizable Christian Identity figures like Bertrand Comparet and Richard Girnt Butler. Swift ordained Gale as a Christian Identity minister that same year. Political scientist Michael Barkun refers to Gale as "a major Identity figure, part of the Comparet-Swift-Gale triumvirate that defined Christian Identity in California." Following Swift's death in 1970, Gale turned from advocate to enemy, attacking Swift and his followers in his writings and publications.

Gale has been described as the founder of the Posse Comitatus movement. According to Barkun, the Posse Comitatus was not specifically an Identity movement. However, prominent Identity figures were associated with it. Gale founded the United States Christian Posse Associates as an offshoot of his Ministry of Christ church. Later, he became one of the founders of the Christian Patriot movement in the 1980s.

On October 2, 1987, Gale was convicted of tax related crimes and sent to prison. While his appeal was pending, he died on April 28, 1988.

According to Dan Gayman, it was Gale who played the primary role in bringing revolutionary violence into the Identity community.
