= Three Percenters =

American and Canadian far-right militia group

3 Percenters
- The "Nyberg flag", a popular symbol of the Three Percenter movement
- Formation: 2008; 18 years ago
- Founder: Michael Brian "Mike" Vanderboegh
- Location(s): United States; Canada
- Region served: North America

The Three Percenters (Note: Also styled 3 Percenters, 3%ers and III%ers) is a decentralized, far-right, anti-government movement in the United States. It was formed as a reaction to the election of U.S. president Barack Obama during a time of overall growth in the American militia movement from 2008 to 2009. The name "Three Percenter" derives from an inaccurate claim that only three percent of American colonists fought against the British during the American Revolution.

The Three Percenter movement shares the general ideology of the American militia and patriot movements, including promotion of gun ownership rights and resistance to the U.S. federal government. Many members also belong to other anti-government groups including the Oath Keepers. In more recent years, the movement has broadened to oppose immigrants, Muslims, and left-wing activists such as Antifa.

The group is based in the U.S. and also has a presence in Canada. Many different individuals and groups have identified themselves as "Three Percenters". Despite the lack of formal leadership, Canada has labeled Three Percenters as a terrorist entity. Members of the Three Percenter movement participated in the January 6 United States Capitol attack. In 2021, six men associated with the group were charged with conspiracy in connection with the attack on the Capitol.

== Founding and membership ==
The idea for the Three Percenters movement came from gun rights advocate Mike Vanderboegh on a blog called the Sipsey Street Irregulars between 2008 and 2009. Vanderboegh was a member of the Oath Keepers, a group with whom the Three Percenters remain loosely aligned. According to the Anti-Defamation League (ADL), Vanderboegh claimed to be commander of an Alabama militia group, the First Alabama Cavalry Regiment, though he appeared to be its sole member. Vanderboegh claimed to have formerly been a member of Students for a Democratic Society and the Socialist Workers Party who abandoned left-wing politics in 1977 after being introduced to libertarianism.

Vanderboegh said that reading Friedrich Hayek's book The Road to Serfdom pushed him to the right. He became a Second Amendment activist and by the 1990s was involved with the militia movement. After the Oklahoma City bombing in 1995, Vanderboegh became better known for popularizing anti-government conspiracy theories. He self-published a novel titled Absolved online in 2008, calling it "a cautionary tale for the out-of-control gun cops of the ATF". Vanderboegh received national media attention in 2011, when four suspected militia members in Georgia were arrested for a plan for a biological attack supposedly inspired by his novel Absolved. He denied responsibility from the alleged plot. Vanderboegh died on August 10, 2016.

The Three Percenters movement was a reaction to the election of Barack Obama as president of the United States. Members believed that Obama's presidency would lead to increased government interference in the lives of individuals, and particularly stricter gun control laws. The group's Facebook page mostly features posts supporting gun rights.

A popular symbol of the group is the "Nyberg flag", named for its designer Gayle Nyberg. It is a modified Betsy Ross flag with the Roman numeral "III" displayed within the circle of 13 stars. Members will also add "III" to their social media profiles.

Some members belong to law enforcement organizations and the military, as well as anti-government groups such as the Oath Keepers. As of 2019, the national Three Percenters organization employed a hierarchical command structure, including requiring members to take an oath similar to that of the U.S. armed forces. Members also active in the armed forces were asked to swear an additional oath promising to disobey certain official orders, including a refusal to disarm U.S. citizens. Members of the national organization have also been required to vote in elections to oppose laws the group sees as unconstitutional.

== Ideology ==
Political Research Associates characterizes Three Percenters as a paramilitary group within the broader patriot movement. According to the ADL, Three Percenters constitute a significant part of the broader anti-government militia movement, whose ideology they share. Both the ADL and the Southern Poverty Law Center have designated Three Percenters as a hate group. Three Percenters believe that individual patriots must be prepared to violently resist the U.S. federal government, which they characterize as overstepping its Constitutional limits. Its stated goals include protecting the right to keep and bear arms, and to "push back against tyranny".

According to its website, one national Three Percenters group opposes federal involvement in what they consider local affairs and states in its bylaws that county sheriffs are "the supreme law of the land". The website states that the group is "not a militia" and "not anti-government". The website claims that the Three Percenters are a "national organization made up of patriotic citizens who love their country, their freedoms, and their liberty." The group encompasses nativist and Christian fundamentalist elements involved in planning bomb attacks, as well as opposition to immigrants, Muslims, and left-wing activists such as Antifa. Author Malcolm Nance has described the movement as right-libertarian.

Like other American militia movements, Three Percenters believe in the ability of citizen volunteers with ordinary weapons to successfully resist the United States military. They support this belief by claiming that only around 3% of American colonists fought the British during the American Revolution, a claim which underestimates the number of people who resisted British rule, and which does not take into account the concentration of British forces in coastal cities, the similarity of weapons used by American and British forces, and French support for the colonists. (Note: Observer estimates the figure "when [including] all in the Continental Army, militia or other units, or those who served but didn’t file for a pension or bounty-land warrant application", and "[when including] U.S. Navy, state navies, Continental Marines (2,000 by one estimate) and the estimated 55,000 who served on American Privateers" as being from 15% to 25% respectively, and follows by noting "even six percent [to be] a very sizable number of the population of any country to fight a war.")

The group's website states that it does not discriminate against anyone; however, in response to Black Lives Matter protests following the 2014 shooting of Michael Brown in Ferguson, Missouri, the Three Percenters' Facebook page featured numerous racist comments made by its supporters.

== Organization and activities ==
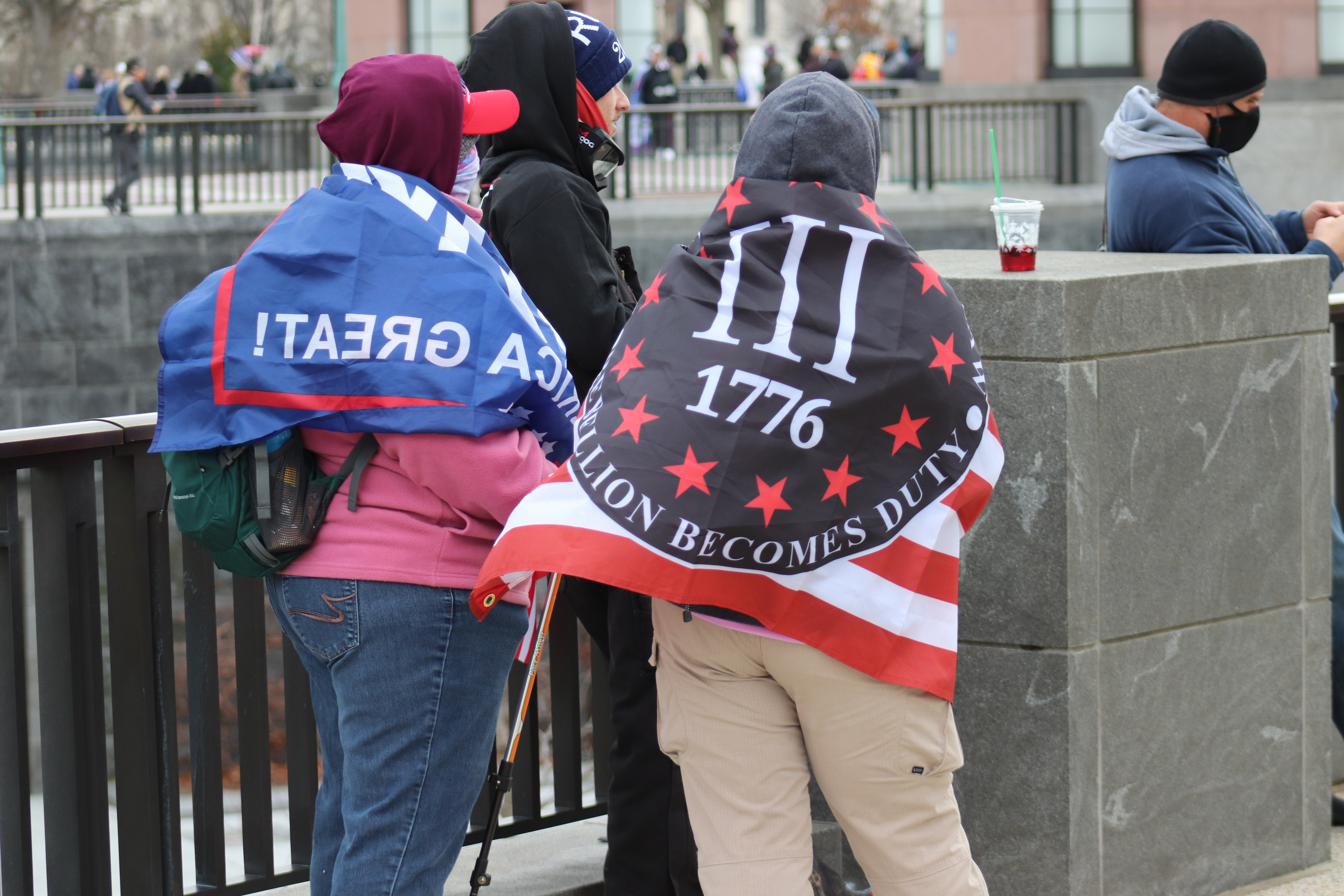
A protester wears a Three Percenter flag during the 2021 storming of the United States Capitol.

Over time, different national and regional Three Percenter umbrella organisations have formed and disbanded, often coexisting while remaining largely independent from one another. While hierarchical at a local level, nationally they operate as a decentralized system of networks or cells.

Chapters engage in paramilitary activities and attend counter-protests opposing left wing activism. Members often attend anti-government protests in tactical gear, such as the armed standoff between Cliven Bundy and the federal government in 2014. Three Percenters have joined vigilante patrols along the U.S.–Mexico border and have provided security for pro–Donald Trump and white-supremacist rallies, including the 2017 Unite the Right rally in Charlottesville, Virginia; the group later sought to distance itself from the white supremacist movement.

The group's members have a record of involvement in criminal activity, and some have been associated with acts of violence as well as violent threats. According to the International Centre for Counter-Terrorism, individuals associated with the Three Percenters have "used or planned to use firearms and explosives in plots targeting law enforcement officers, private businesses, an abortion clinic, a mosque, and housing complexes inhabited by immigrants".

In 2013, Christian Allen Kerodin and associates were working on the construction of a walled compound in Benewah County, Idaho, "for Three Percenters", designed to house 7,000 people following a major disaster, an initiative which local law enforcement has described as a "scam".

In April 2013, a group of Jersey City, New Jersey, police officers were disciplined for wearing patches reading "One of the 3%".

Following the 2015 Chattanooga shootings at a strip mall, a military recruitment center and a United States Navy Operational Support Center in Chattanooga, Tennessee, Three Percenters, Oath Keepers, and other militia groups began organizing armed gatherings outside of recruiting centers in several states, with the stated objective of protecting service members, who were barred from carrying weapons while on duty in civilian recruitment centers. In response, the Army Command Operations Center Security Division issued a letter ordering soldiers not to interact with or acknowledge armed civilians outside of recruitment centers, and that "If questioned by these alleged concerned citizens, be polite, professional and terminate the conversation immediately and report the incident to local law enforcement", noting that the issuing officer is "sure the citizens mean well, but we cannot assume this in every case and we do not want to advocate this behavior".

An Idaho Three Percenter group protested refugee resettlement in that state in 2015. In 2016, the "3 Percenters of Idaho" group announced it was sending some of its members in support of the occupation of the Malheur National Wildlife Refuge in Oregon, allegedly in order to "secure the perimeter" and to prevent a "Waco-style situation". They left several hours later after being told their assistance was not needed. Two days previously, Three Percenters founder Mike Vanderboegh had described the occupiers as "a collection of fruits and nuts". "What Bundy and this collection of fruits and nuts has done is give the feds the perfect opportunity to advance their agenda to discredit us", he said.

The group provided security for a 2017 event held by Patriot Prayer called "Rally for Trump and Freedom". Several Three Percenters were also present at the Unite the Right rally in Charlottesville, Virginia, in August 2017, along with members of the Redneck Revolt, a left-leaning militia group. After the events at Charlottesville, the group's "National Council" issued a "stand down order", stating, "we will not align ourselves with any type of racist group". The group issued a statement saying they "strongly reject and denounce anyone who calls themselves a patriot or a Three Percenter that has attended or is planning on attending any type of protest or counter protest related to these white supremacist and Nazi groups".

In 2017, a 23-year-old Oklahoma man, Jerry Drake Varnell, was arrested on federal charges of plotting a vehicle bomb attack on a bank in downtown Oklahoma City, modeled after the 1995 Oklahoma City bombing. During a meeting in 2017 with undercover FBI agents, Varnell identified with the Three Percenters movement, saying that he subscribed to "III% ideology" and intended "to start the next revolution." In March 2020, Varnell was found guilty of conspiracy to use an explosive device to damage a building used in interstate commerce and planning to use a weapon of mass destruction against property used in interstate commerce. He was sentenced to 25 years in prison.

In 2018, three men were arrested in connection with the bombing of the Dar Al-Farooq Islamic Center in Bloomington, Minnesota. The bombing was non-lethal. One of the men involved, former sheriff's deputy Michael B. Hari, had connections to the III%s.

In June 2019, Oregon governor Kate Brown sent the Oregon State Police to bring 11 absent Republican state senators back to the Oregon State Capitol. The Republican state senators had gone into hiding to prevent a vote on a cap-and-trade proposal to lower greenhouse gas emissions by 2050 to combat climate change. The Three Percenters offered support for the Republican senators, declaring they would be "doing whatever it takes to keep these senators safe". On June 22, 2019, a session of the Oregon Senate was cancelled when the Oregon State Capitol was closed due to a warning from the state police of a "possible militia threat".

In May 2020, during a Second Amendment rally on Memorial Day weekend in Frankfort, Kentucky, Three Percenters and other protesters breached several off-limit barriers to access the front porch of the Governor's Mansion, Governor Andy Beshear's primary residence, and began heckling the Mansion's occupants in response to the Governor's restrictions related to the COVID-19 pandemic. Soon afterward, members of the group moved several hundred yards away. They hung an effigy bearing the Governor's face and a sign reading sic semper tyrannis ("thus always to tyrants") from a tree. The event drew condemnation from Beshear and from across the political spectrum. Some state officials had joined the Three Percenters at earlier events, including Kentucky State Representatives Savannah Maddox and Stan Lee, and Kentucky State Senator John Schickel. Beshear labeled the group as "radical", that their actions were "aimed at creating fear and terror", and declared that officials who appeared at previous Three Percenter events "cannot fan the flames and then condemn the fire."

Three Percenters Barry Croft and Adam Fox took part in a plot to kidnap Michigan governor Gretchen Whitmer. Michael Jung, a prominent Three Percenter in Wisconsin, offered a location for members to train. He claims to be the second-in-command of the Wisconsin branch.

Colorado congresswoman Lauren Boebert has close ties to the group.

== Participation in the January 6 United States Capitol attack ==
Supporters of the Three Percenters were present and wore emblematic gear or symbols during the protests and storming of the U.S. Capitol on January 6, 2021. Other groups attending included the Proud Boys and Oath Keepers. After breaking through police lines or being let through multiple police perimeters, these groups occupied, vandalized, breached the Capitol Building and ransacked it for several hours.

At least one man tied to the Three Percenter movement was arrested and charged with involvement of the attack; the man was also reportedly tied to two other extremist groups, the Proud Boys and Oath Keepers. At the time of the January 6 protests, a truck owned by Illinois state representative Chris Miller (the husband of U.S. representative Mary Miller) was in a restricted area next to the Capitol and bore a Three Percenters decal logo. On March 18, 2021, the Illinois House voted to censure Miller for attending the January 6 "Save America" rally that preceded the insurrection at the Capitol by supporters of former President Donald Trump.

Multiple factions of the Three Percenters were also involved in the attack, including 'DC Brigade', 'Patriot Boys of North Texas', and 'B Squad'. The B Squad and DC Brigade conspired with the Proud Boys and Oath Keepers. Three Percenters' participation in the attack prompted one of the remaining national groups to dissolve, stating in a final message that other Three Percenter groups' actions had cast the movement in a "negative light".

=== Indictments and sentences ===
Guy Reffitt, a member of the Three Percenters from Wylie, Texas, was present at the January 6 United States Capitol attack wearing body armor and carrying a handgun and plastic handcuffs on the Capitol grounds with the intent to remove House speaker Nancy Pelosi and Senate majority leader Mitch McConnell from the premises. He was referred to as the guy that "lit the match" and helped to ignite the crowd into an "unstoppable force". He was found guilty of five charges and was sentenced to more than seven years in prison.

In June 2021, six men who identified as members of the Three Percenters were indicted by a grand jury for "conspiring to obstruct congressional proceedings." The indictment alleges that they coordinated travel to Washington, D.C., with intent for disruption; some were wearing body armor and tactical gear, and at least one carried a knife. They alleged they were acting as security for principals such as Trump friend and advisor Roger Stone. All have pled not guilty. They are:

1. Alan Hostetter of San Clemente, California, former police Chief of La Habra and yoga instructor, was accused of conspiracy to obstruct an official proceeding. Hostetter was sentenced to 135 months in prison.
2. Erik Scott Warner of Menifee, California, is charged with federal offenses that include conspiracy, obstructing an official proceeding, and unlawful entry on restricted buildings or grounds.
3. Felipe Antonio "Tony" Martinez of Lake Elsinore, California, is charged with federal offenses, including conspiracy, obstructing an official proceeding, and unlawful entry on restricted buildings or grounds.
4. Derek Kinnison of Lake Elsinore, California, is charged with federal offenses, including conspiracy, obstructing an official proceeding, unlawful entry on restricted buildings or grounds, and tampering with documents or proceedings.
5. Ronald Mele of Temecula, California, is charged with federal offenses, including conspiracy, obstructing an official proceeding, and unlawful entry on restricted buildings or grounds.
6. Russell Taylor of Ladera Ranch is charged with federal offenses, including conspiracy, obstructing an official proceeding, and unlawful entry on restricted buildings or grounds. He is also charged with obstructing law enforcement during a civil disorder and unlawful possession of a dangerous weapon on Capitol grounds.

== In Canada ==
On June 25, 2021, the group was added to the Canadian Criminal Code's list of terrorist entities to prevent them from accessing financial support. One Canadian expert, Maxime Fiset, a former neo-Nazi who works with the Centre for the Prevention of Radicalization Leading to Violence, considers the group the "most dangerous" extremist group in the country. Hate crime expert Barbara Perry said that Islamophobia was the main focus of the Canadian chapters, urged that police investigate the group, and called the group "scary".

== See also ==
- American Patriots Three Percent
- Boogaloo movement
- Christian Patriot movement
- Five Percenters
- List of militia organizations in the United States
- Patriot Front
- Posse Comitatus
- Washington State Three Percenters
- 3.5% rule
