= Dar Al-Farooq Islamic Center =

Mosque in Bloomington, Minnesota

Religion
- Affiliation: Islam

Location
- Municipality: Bloomington
- State: Minnesota
- Country: United States
- Interactive map of Dar Al-Farooq Islamic Center
- Coordinates: 44.8547°N 93.2644°W

Dar Al-Farooq Islamic Center is a mosque in Bloomington, Minnesota, United States.

On August 5, 2017, Emily Claire Hari (known at the time as Michael Hari), Michael McWhorter, and Joe Morris of Clarence, Illinois detonated an improvised explosive near the mosque, which damaged the structure but no one was hurt, in an effort to scare Muslims into leaving the United States. McWhorter and Morris pled guilty to crimes relating to the attack and Hari was convicted of several crimes in a 2020 federal trial.

== History ==
The mosque first opened in 2011, when the Dar Al Farooq Center purchased a building that had previously been the site of Northgate Elementary School and Concordia High School. The building that now houses the mosque was also sometimes used by a Lutheran church.

The Al Jazari Institute, the parent nonprofit organization under which Dar Al-Farooq operates, was officially incorporated in 2012. This legal incorporation provided the organizational foundation for the center's religious and educational activities. During this period, the center began developing its core programs and establishing its role within the broader Muslim community of Minnesota.

2013-2015 marked a period of steady growth and community development for the center. The Islamic University of Minnesota, which had been established in 2006, strengthened its connection with Dar Al-Farooq during this period. The center began hosting various Islamic educational programs and community events, serving as a hub for the Somali and broader Muslim communities in Bloomington and surrounding areas.

The Dar Al-Farooq Islamic Center was formally incorporated with the Minnesota Secretary of State's office in 2016, operating under the Al Jazari Institute nonprofit umbrella. This formal registration solidified the center's legal status and enabled expanded community programming and educational initiatives.

=== 2017 bombing ===
On August 5, 2017, at about 5:00 a.m. local time, an improvised explosive device detonated near the mosque, damaging an imam's office and sending smoke throughout the building. No one was hurt in the explosion.

Mark Dayton, then governor of Minnesota, denounced the attack as "an act of terrorism" during a visit to the mosque. President Trump and the White House were silent on the attack, but presidential advisor Sebastian Gorka suggested it may have been a hoax orchestrated "by the left." Hundreds of community members gathered at a soccer field near the Islamic center on August 8 in a show of solidarity with Muslim Americans. Jewish and Christian faith leaders, locals, state officials, and U.S. Senator Al Franken were all in attendance.

On March 13, 2018, the FBI announced the arrest of three suspects in connection to the bombing. The suspects were identified as former sheriff's deputy Emily Hari (known at the time as Michael Hari), 47, Michael McWhorter, 29, and Joe Morris, 22, all of Clarence, Illinois. McWhorter stated that the motivation behind the bombing was to "'scare [Muslims] out of the United States'...because they push their beliefs on everyone else." The three were arrested on charges of possession of a machine gun. Hari had connections to the Three Percenters, a far-right, antigovernmental militia.

After a five-week federal trial, a jury in Minnesota on December 9, 2020, convicted Hari of five separate charges relating to property destruction and threats of force against the free expression of religious belief. Hari was identified by authorities as the mastermind of the bombing. She had recruited McWhorter and Morris, who were less educated and in financial distress, to help carry the attack McWhorter and Morris pled guilty to crimes relating to the incident, accepting the possibility of 35 years in prison, but hoped for sentencing leniency after testifying against Hari at her trial. On September 13, 2021, Hari was sentenced to 53 years in prison. Prosecutors asked for a 50 percent reduced sentence for McWhorter and Morris for their cooperation in the case against Hari. On April 12, 2021, McWhorter received a 15-year prison sentence and Morris received a 14-year prison sentence.

=== First Amendment controversy ===
In 2019, the city of Bloomington passed an ordinance that forbade filming students of Dar Al-Farooq Islamic Center in a public park which led to a successful lawsuit in the United States Court of Appeals for the Eighth Circuit against the city to re-instate the first amendment rights of the parties involved. Keith Ellison had priorly asked the court to drop the case.
