= 2014 Las Vegas shootings =

Shooting attack in Nevada, U.S.

- Location: Las Vegas, Nevada, U.S.
- Date: June 8, 2014; 12 years ago 11:22 a.m. – 12:00 p.m. (PDT)
- Target: Police officers
- Attack type: Triple-murder, murder–suicide, shootout, domestic terrorism
- Weapons: 9mm Smith & Wesson M&P9 pistol; .38 Special Ruger LCR revolver; 9mm Glock 17 pistol (stolen); 9mm H&K USP (stolen); Winchester 1300 shotgun; Knives
- Deaths: 5 (including both perpetrators)
- Injuries: 0
- Perpetrators: Jerad and Amanda Miller
- Defender: Joseph Wilcox
- Motive: Anti-government sentiment

The 2014 Las Vegas shootings occurred on June 8, 2014, when a married couple, Jerad and Amanda Miller, committed a shooting in northeastern Las Vegas, Nevada. Five people died, including the two shooters. The couple, who espoused extreme anti-government views, first killed two Las Vegas police officers at a restaurant before fleeing into a Walmart, where they killed an intervening armed civilian named Joseph Wilcox. The couple died after engaging responding officers in a shootout in Walmart; police shot and killed Jerad, while Amanda committed suicide after being wounded.

== Shootings ==
On June 8, 2014, the Millers first went to a CiCi's Pizza restaurant on foot at 11:22 a.m., finding Las Vegas police officers Igor Soldo and Alyn Beck, who were eating pizza at the restaurant on their lunch break. Prior to the shooting, Jerad had entered the restaurant, asked an employee where the restrooms were, and then left and came back with Amanda two minutes later. Jerad fatally shot Soldo in the side of the head with a handgun, then shot Beck in the throat, head and chest. Both Millers then fired at Soldo and Beck, shooting them multiple times after Beck had fallen to the ground. Afterwards, they covered Beck with a yellow Gadsden flag and a swastika. They pinned a note on Beck's body, which read: "This is the beginning of the revolution." They also stole both officers' handguns and spare ammunition magazines. During the restaurant shooting, the Millers loudly declared to other patrons that it happened to be the start of "a revolution".

The two then fled to a nearby Walmart, where Jerad fired a shot at the ceiling and ordered shoppers to leave. Joseph Wilcox, a customer, drew his concealed 9mm Glock 19 and confronted Jerad, but passed Amanda as he did so, not realizing that she was armed and Jerad's accomplice; Amanda shot and killed Wilcox with a single shot to the back, hitting him in the ribs. Police (Officers Brett Brosnahan, Tim Gross, Zachery Beal, John Bethard, David Corbin, and Sergeant Kurt McKenzie) later responded to 9-1-1 calls and arrived at the Walmart, engaging the Millers in a gunfight (The police officers were able to locate the suspects and get information from Officers Troy Nicol and Ryan Fryman who were monitoring the CCTV of the Walmart), during which Amanda was wounded. The Millers moved toward the back of the store, to the automotive section, where they tried to protect themselves from gunfire using several items from the store as a barricade. Police Officer Zachery Beal eventually shot Jerad in the chest, killing him, while Amanda shot and critically wounded herself in the head. She was taken to the University Medical Center of Southern Nevada, where she died. Initial reports inaccurately indicated that Amanda shot Jerad repeatedly in the chest after he had "laid down" in front of her, killing him, before committing suicide.

An investigation later recovered a 9mm Smith & Wesson M&P handgun, a .38-caliber Ruger revolver, the two handguns stolen from Officers Soldo and Beck (a Glock 17 and H&K USP 9mm, respectively), a Winchester 1300 shotgun, 200 rounds of ammunition, knives, and survival items from both Millers' backpacks. During a search at the Millers' apartment, papers that detailed plans to "take over a courthouse and execute public officials" were found.

=== Victims ===
- Officer Igor Soldo, 31
- Officer Alyn Beck, 41
- Joseph Robert Wilcox, 31

== Perpetrators ==
=== Jerad Miller ===
Jerad Dwain Miller (January 3, 1983 – June 8, 2014) was born in Kennewick, Washington. Jerad was arrested for multiple offenses in Washington and Indiana, starting in 2001. In 2007, he was sentenced to a diversion program after pleading guilty to a felony criminal recklessness charge. In 2009, he was arrested and charged with battery, but was acquitted later that year. In 2011, he was sentenced to two years of probation and drug counseling after pleading guilty to felony drug charges. That same year, Jerad met Amanda Woodruff, with whom he applied for a marriage license in Tippecanoe County, Indiana in August. They later married on September 22. Prior to the shooting, he worked as a street performer.

In February 2014, Jerad threatened a Bureau of Motor Vehicles office in Indiana, claiming that he would start killing anyone who showed up to arrest him for having a suspended driver's license. But after being confronted by police, Miller walked back his remarks and authorities found no probable cause for arrest at the time. The case was later closed. He was described as often talking about conspiracy theories, dressing in camouflage, and espousing his hatred of the federal government and President Barack Obama. He was also a fan of the decentralized police accountability group Cop Block and would share online videos of police brutality, as well as posts of conspiracy theories and anti-government rhetoric.

Prior to the shooting, Jerad had accounts on Facebook and YouTube, where he made ranting posts and videos. He once posted on June 2:

We can hope for peace. We must, however, prepare for war. We face an enemy that is not only well funded, but who believe they fight for freedom and justice. Those of us who know the truth and dare speak it, know that the enemy we face are indeed our brothers. ... To stop this oppression, I fear, can ... only be accomplished with bloodshed.

One month prior to the shooting, Jerad asked several other Facebook users to send him "a rifle to help stand against tyranny". On the day prior to the shooting, Jerad posted a message on his account that forewarned the attack:

The dawn of a new day. May all of our coming sacrifices be worth it.

=== Amanda Miller ===
Amanda Renee Miller (née Woodruff; December 27, 1991 – June 8, 2014) was born in Lafayette, Indiana. She did not have a criminal record preceding the shootings. In 2011, she met Jerad, with whom she applied for a marriage license in Tippecanoe County, Indiana in August 2012. They married on September 22. Like Jerad, she had a Facebook account, in which she made multiple posts, including numerous photos depicting the Millers dressed as supervillains. In one such photo, Amanda and Jerad were dressed up as Batman villains Harley Quinn and the Joker, respectively; according to a neighbor, the Millers particularly liked to dress up as the characters. In one of her Facebook posts, which was dated May 23, 2011, she wrote:

[T]o the people in the world...your lucky i can't kill you now but remember one day one day i will get you because one day all hell will break lose and i'll be standing in the middle of it with a shot gun in one hand and a pistol in the other. [sic]

In January 2014, the Millers moved from Lafayette, Indiana to Las Vegas, which Amanda recorded.

=== Presence at Bundy standoff ===
During the April 2014 Bundy standoff, in which the Bureau of Land Management (BLM) attempted to round up cattle belonging to rancher Cliven Bundy, who refused to vacate public land, Jerad was said to have been among the armed protesters who joined Bundy during the incident. According to Bundy's son, Ammon Bundy, the Millers were present during the standoff for a few days, but had been instructed by a militia member to leave due to "their radical beliefs", which did not align with the protest's main issues. They were also instructed to leave because Jerad was a felon in possession of a firearm. Carol Bundy later commented, "I have not seen or heard anything from the militia and others who have came to our ranch that would, in any way, make me think they had an intent to kill or harm anyone."

During the standoff, Jerad had made interviews with other protesters at the ranch, and was also interviewed by CNN, NBC News affiliate KRNV-DT, and other news stations, during which he said:

I feel sorry for any federal agents that want to come in here and try to push us around or anything like that. I really don't want violence toward them, but if they're going to come bring violence to us, well, if that's the language they want to speak, we'll learn it.

=== Motives ===
Jerad posted several online videos. In one, he was dressed as the Joker. In one video, he expressed a strong hatred for law enforcement and police officers in general, warning in an online video that they "cannot be trusted". In another, he denounced the US government as being oppressive, especially criticizing their measures at gun control, surveillance, and their treatment of Cliven Bundy. Friends of the Millers reported that they idolized Eric Harris and Dylan Klebold, the two perpetrators of the 1999 Columbine High School massacre, and wanted to follow in their footsteps. Their neighbour stated "[t]hey had been handing out white-power propaganda and talking about doing the next Columbine". The Millers' ideology about the government has been described as "along the lines of militia and white supremacists" by a police official.

During the shooting, the Millers placed a swastika on the body of slain officer Alyn Beck and hung a Gadsden flag on the crime scene; police officials remarked that this act did not signify the Millers were white supremacists, but instead was intended to associate police officers with Nazism.

The Millers supported the Patriot movement, a collection of various groups with a shared ideology for limited federal government. According to Mark Potok, a spokesperson for the Southern Poverty Law Center, there was no evidence that they belonged in a specific group, but that they considered the outcome of the standoff between Bundy and the Bureau of Land Management as "a huge victory against the federal government", which reportedly motivated them to commit the shooting spree.

== Reactions ==
Interior Secretary Sally Jewell made a statement on the day following the shootings and commented about the Millers' presence on the Bundy ranch. She said, "It's very important to bring lawbreakers to justice. There's no question that my colleagues back here, the governors of Western states, do not want people riding roughshod over the landscape ... [Bundy] had put our people in grave danger by calling in armed citizens from around the country." U.S. Senator Harry Reid, who had a staff member related to one of the victims, said, "All of Nevada mourns the tragic loss of our neighbors, our friends, and in the case of Officers Alyn Beck and Igor Soldo, our protectors" and called for universal background checks in the purchases of firearms. Las Vegas Mayor Carolyn Goodman called the shootings "a cruel act" and also praised the Las Vegas Metropolitan Police for "dedicating their lives to protecting all of us in our community". Nevada Governor Brian Sandoval released a statement, saying that he was saddened by the murders and called the shootings "an act of senseless violence". CiCi's Pizza and Walmart also gave their condolences to the victims, with the latter also stating that it would cooperate with police during the investigation.

Las Vegas Sheriff Doug Gillespie described Joseph Wilcox as a hero, saying, "Joseph died attempting to protect others. His death is completely senseless." Wilcox's attempt at stopping Jerad Miller by using his concealed firearm also led to a debate over the necessity of concealed carry and its effectiveness during similar incidents.

On social media, there has been some public praise by anti-government radicals for the killings of Soldo and Beck. As a result of aggressive anti-police posts on Facebook, there has been criticism of the site's lack of responsive action. Facebook commented through a spokesperson, "People come to Facebook to share experiences of the world around them and on occasion this may result in the sharing of content that some may find upsetting. We encourage anyone who sees content that violates our community standards to report it to us."

== See also ==
- List of homicides in Nevada
- 2009 Lakewood shooting
- 2009 shootings of Oakland police officers
- 2016 shooting of Baton Rouge police officers
- 2016 shooting of Dallas police officers
- Christopher Dorner shootings and manhunt
- Jeffrey and Jill Erickson — a married couple whose criminal exploits also ended in suicide
