= Constitutionalism in the United States =

Constitution is the supreme legal authority

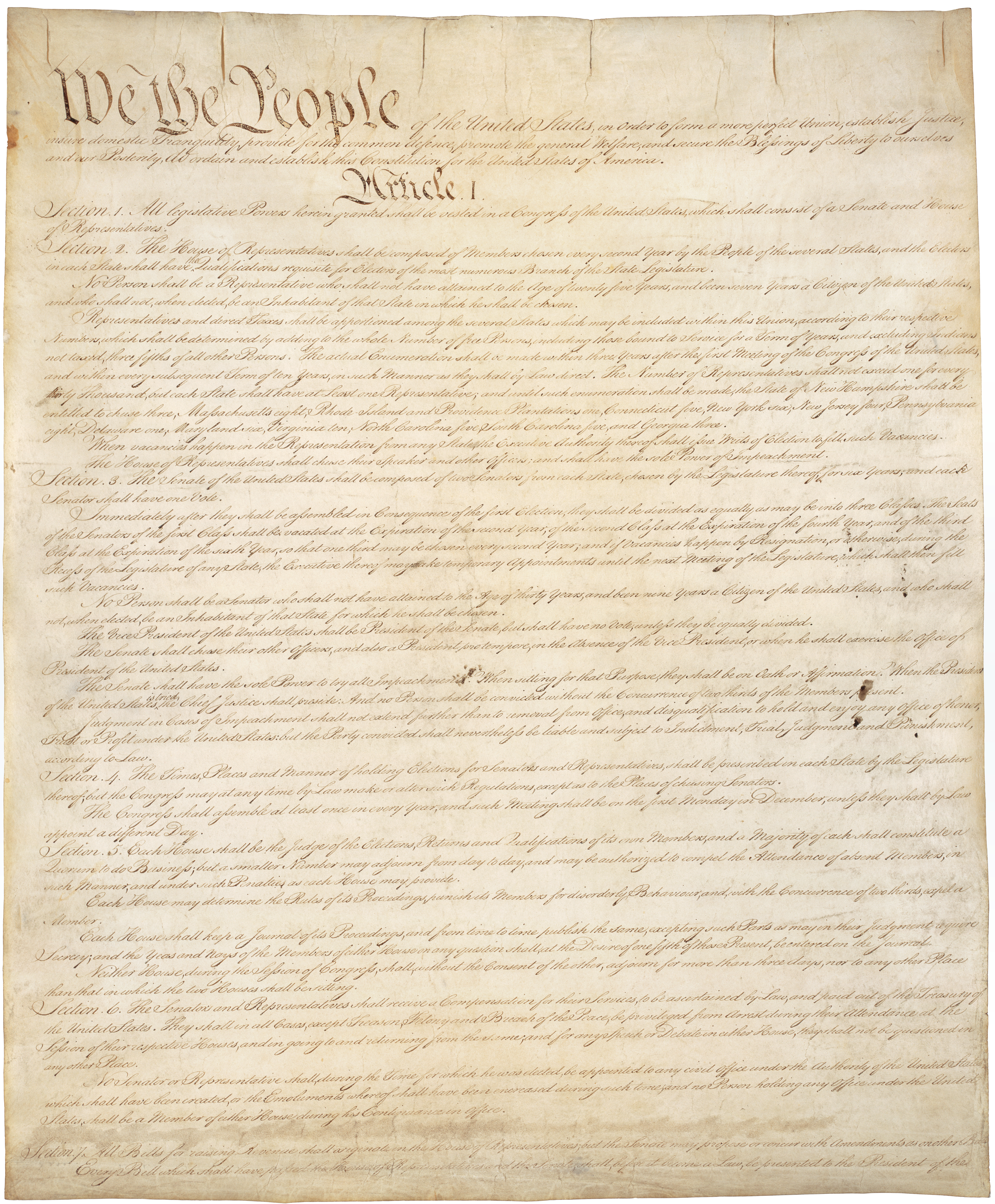
Page one of the Constitution of the United States

Constitutionalism in the United States is the framework of principles and practices that uphold the United States Constitution as the supreme law of the land, guiding governance and protecting individual rights. It emphasizes the rule of law, separation of powers, checks and balances, judicial review, and federalism, rooted in Enlightenment ideals of liberty and governance by consent. Since its ratification in 1788, the Constitution has shaped American political, legal, and cultural development.

== Historical background ==
=== Origins and influences ===
The U.S. Constitution, drafted in 1787 at the Constitutional Convention in Philadelphia, addressed the weaknesses of the Articles of Confederation, which lacked a strong central government. Influenced by Enlightenment thinkers like John Locke and Montesquieu, as well as British legal traditions such as Magna Carta (1215) and the English Bill of Rights (1689), the framers sought to balance power and liberty. The Constitution established a federal system and a tripartite government with legislative, executive, and judicial branches.

The Bill of Rights, ratified in 1791, added the first ten amendments to protect individual liberties, including freedom of speech, freedom of religion, and freedom of the press.

=== Ratification and early debates ===
Ratification sparked debate between Federalists, who favored a strong central government, and Anti-Federalists, who feared centralized power and demanded explicit rights protections. The Federalist Papers, authored by Alexander Hamilton, James Madison, and John Jay, defended constitutionalism, emphasizing checks and balances to prevent tyranny.

== Core principles ==
=== Rule of law ===
The Constitution is the supreme legal authority, binding all government branches and citizens. This ensures fairness and predictability in governance.

=== Separation of powers ===
The Constitution divides government into three branches: - Legislative: Congress, responsible for lawmaking (Article I). - Executive: The President, tasked with enforcing laws (Article II). - Judicial: The Supreme Court and federal courts, which interpret laws (Article III).

Each branch operates independently to prevent dominance.

=== Checks and balances ===
Each branch can limit the others, such as Congress overriding presidential vetoes or the judiciary declaring laws unconstitutional.

=== Judicial review ===
Established in Marbury v. Madison (1803), judicial review allows courts to invalidate unconstitutional laws or actions. Chief Justice John Marshall solidified the judiciary's role as a constitutional guardian.

=== Federalism ===
The Tenth Amendment reserves powers not delegated to the federal government for states or the people, fostering local governance.

=== Individual rights ===
The Bill of Rights and amendments like the Fourteenth Amendment protect freedoms and ensure equal protection.

== Constitutional interpretation ==
=== Originalism vs. living constitutionalism ===
Debates over interpretation shape constitutionalism: - Originalism: Interprets the Constitution based on its original meaning, as advocated by Justice Antonin Scalia. - Living constitutionalism: Views the Constitution as adapting to modern needs, championed by Justice William J. Brennan Jr..

These approaches influence rulings like District of Columbia v. Heller (2008) on gun rights and Obergefell v. Hodges (2015) on marriage equality.

=== Landmark cases ===
Key decisions include: - McCulloch v. Maryland (1819): Upheld federal supremacy. - Brown v. Board of Education (1954): Ended racial segregation. - Dobbs v. Jackson Women's Health Organization (2022): Overturned Roe v. Wade, shifting abortion rights to states.

== Contemporary issues ==
=== Security vs. liberty ===
Post-9/11, policies like the USA PATRIOT Act raised concerns about surveillance and due process.

=== Federalism disputes ===
Issues like healthcare (National Federation of Independent Business v. Sebelius, 2012) highlight federal-state tensions.

=== Judicial independence ===
Politicized judicial appointments spark concerns about impartiality.

=== Amending the Constitution ===
The amendment process is rigorous, with only 27 amendments ratified. The Equal Rights Amendment remains unadopted.

== Global influence ==
U.S. constitutionalism has influenced global constitutions, particularly in federal systems and bills of rights, though its rigid amendment process is distinctive.

== See also ==
- United States constitutional law - Constitutional convention (political custom) - Constitutional crisis

- Alliance Defending Freedom
- American Civil Liberties Union
- Center for Constitutional Rights
- Constitutional militia movement
- Drug Policy Alliance
- Electronic Frontier Foundation
- National Coalition Against Censorship
- National Rifle Association
- New York Civil Liberties Union
- Rutherford Institute
- United States Bill of Rights
