= Idaho Light Foot Militia =

Privately-organized militia group in Idaho

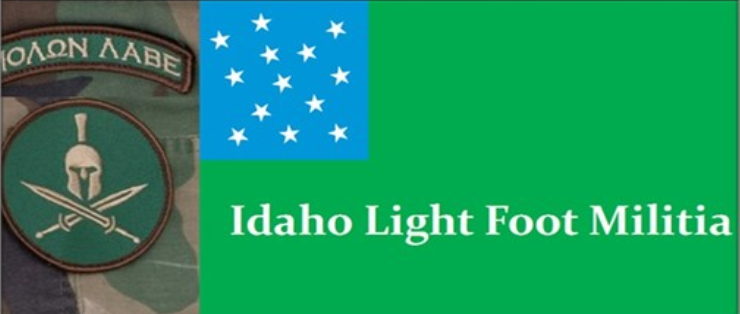
- Dates active: c. 2009–present
- Active regions: Idaho, United States

The Idaho Light Foot Militia (ILFM) is a privately organized militia in the state of Idaho. The Idaho Light Foot Militia is distinct from a state defense force in that it is not recognized as part of the organized militia by the government of Idaho, but is rather privately organized by private citizens in the unorganized militia. The ILFM was founded in 2009.

== Organization ==
The Members of the militia believe they are the "teeth of the Constitution" at a time of economic and political uncertainty for the United States.

== Membership ==
Members participate in training and attend monthly meetings. As of 2021, the militia consisted of over 600 members.
