= Militia of Montana =

American paramilitary organization

Militia of Montana MOM
- Flag used by militiamen in their patches
- Leaders: David Trochmann; John Trochmann
- Dates active: January 1994–present
- Headquarters: Noxon, Montana
- Active regions: Kalispell, Montana
- Ideology: American nationalism American constitutionalism Libertarian conservatism Conservatism
- Status: Semiactive
- Size: Unknown

The Militia of Montana (MOM) is a paramilitary organization founded by David and John Trochmann of Noxon, Montana, United States. The organization formed from the remnants of the United Citizens for Justice in late 1992 in response to the standoff during the siege in Ruby Ridge, Idaho. The Militia of Montana reached their member high point in 1999 and largely disbanded after the Y2K threat turned out to be minor.

The militia has become a foundational model for many of the paramilitary organizations operating throughout the United States.

== History ==
Formed by John Trochmann and his brother David in January 1994, MOM received significant assistance from self-styled analyst Robert Fletcher. Trochmann's wife, Carolyn, who drives a school bus and is a regular substitute teacher at Noxon Public School, had delivered food to the Weaver family during the several months preceding the standoff between the Weaver family and Federal agents in Ruby Ridge, Idaho. The Waco Siege solidified MOM's standing as one of the first established militia groups. John Trochmann stated that people needed to arm and organize themselves in order to prevent future incidents from occurring.

MOM grew in membership and notoriety which culminated in a gathering in Kalispell, Montana, of over 800 people to listen to an address by John Trochmann in June, 1994. In a 1995 interview, John Trochmann stated, "Gun control is people control," and MOM claimed to have more than 12,000 members trained in guerilla warfare, survivalist techniques, and other unconventional tactics in preparation for withstanding the perceived federal government onslaught to seize their weapons presaged by the Waco Siege.

On March 3, 1995, Trochman and three armed men were arrested when they entered the Musselshell County Courthouse and tried to file papers protesting the seizure of Rodney Skurdal's house by the Internal Revenue Service. Three other men, waiting in cars outside the Musselshell Courthouse, were also arrested. They had semiautomatic handguns, six assault rifles, video gear, and $80,000 in cash, gold, and silver in their cars. They styled themselves the Garfield County Freemen. Before the courthouse incident, Mr. Trochmann and others attended a terrorism seminar at Skurdal's home. They planned to kidnap, try, and hang a judge, and videotape the proceedings, according to Musselshell County Attorney John Bohlman.

In March 1995, MOM's newsletter, Taking Aim, reprinted a lengthy letter from Richard John ("Wayne") Snell, a convicted murderer of an Arkansas State Trooper and a pawn shop owner, asserting that his coming execution related to a series of Arkansas scandals allegedly connected with President Bill Clinton, in which twenty-five victims were said to have met strange deaths. Snell was to die, according to MOM, because he "was and still is heavily involved in exposing Clinton for his trail of blood to the White House."

MOM organized against the Brady Handgun Violence Prevention Act and the Federal Assault Weapons Ban which increased membership who believed that threats to the Second Amendment were orchestrated by financial and corporate elites in a global conspiracy. After the Oklahoma City bombing, Robert Fletcher declared to the press, "Expect more bombs!" As fears that the Y2K computer meltdown would provoke social collapse, MOM capitalized on these anxieties through its catalog and John Trochmann's frequent appearances at preparedness expos. After 2000, membership dwindled, however MOM continued to fuel conspiracy theories surrounding the September 11 attacks in 2001 and the 2008 financial crisis.

== Ideology ==
The Militia of Montana supports numerous Right-Wing positions such as American nationalism and Constitutionalism. The group has promoted conspiracy theories regarding 9/11, Y2K, and the 2008 financial crisis.

One of the earliest and most important members of the militia, Robert Fletcher, stated this on antisemitic rhetoric:

If the bulk of the banking elite are Jewish, is that anti-Semitic? The people who are doing this are the international banking elite, and if they are all Jews, so be it, but that's not the case. I don't care if they're Arabs or monkeys.

== See also ==
- American militia movement
