= Christian Patriot movement =

American Christian political movement

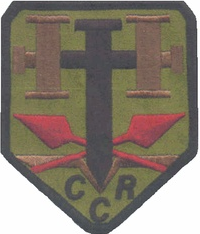
Insignia of Hutaree, a Christian paramilitary group

The Christian Patriot movement is a subset of the broader American Patriot movement that promotes Christian nationalism and emphasizes it as its core goal and philosophy. Like the larger Patriot movement, it promotes an interpretation of American history in which the federal government has turned against the ideas of liberty and natural rights expressed in the American Revolution.

== Ideology ==
The movement was founded by members of the Posse Comitatus, a far-right militia organization. The Posse Comitatus adhered to an ideology which was based on the teachings of William Potter Gale, who was also a Christian Identity minister. According to this ideology, state and federal governments are agents of an arcane conspiracy to deprive Americans of their rights as "sovereign citizens." It also holds the view that this conspiracy can be undermined through various legal pleadings from English common law and other sources, such as a motion protesting the way a defendant's name is typeset in a legal complaint. The ideology persists despite numerous court rulings that have declared its theories frivolous.

== Status ==
The movement grew during the 1990s after the Ruby Ridge and Waco Sieges appeared to confirm the suspicions of Christian Patriots. The movement maintained its ties with the American militia movement of the same period. A highly publicized federal confrontation with Christian Patriots occurred in 1996, when Federal marshals arrested the Montana Freemen.

In 2009, the Southern Poverty Law Center said that militia groups may be experiencing a "Patriot revival."

== See also ==
- Tea Party movement
- Constitutional militia movement
- Miles Christianus
- Bo Gritz
- Gordon Kahl
- James Wesley Rawles
- Alex Jones
- American Redoubt
- Theoconservatism
- Jon Arthur
