= Ranch Rescue =

Volunteer organization

- Leaders: Jack Foote and Casey Nethercott
- Dates active: 2002–c. 2006
- Active regions: Arizona, California, Colorado, Kentucky, New Mexico, Missouri, Oklahoma, Texas, and Virginia United States
- Ideology: American nationalism Nativism; Libertarianism; Paleoconservatism; Survivalism

Ranch Rescue was a volunteer organization that claimed to assist American ranchers and other owners of property near the United States-Mexico border in the protection of their property. The organization claimed that the protection was necessary due to damages caused by unauthorized border crossers, who it called terrorists. It also claimed that the federal government has willfully and intentionally failed to protect property owners.

Generally, Ranch Rescue operated on private property at the behest of the owners. When a landowner requested protection from the organization, Ranch Rescue operatives set up a military-style operation on the property and called it such. The operatives used electronic surveillance equipment, binoculars, flares, two-way radios, trained dogs, and firearms and other weapons.

Ranch Rescue had chapters in the states of Arizona, California, Colorado, Kentucky, New Mexico, Missouri, Oklahoma, Texas, and Virginia. As of 2003, its largest chapter in Arizona had disbanded. Its Web site, ranchrescue.com, links to news articles and opinion pieces regarding the U.S.-Mexico border, went dead in 2007.

== Successful suit by two illegal immigrants ==
An operation at Sutton Ranch in Jim Hogg County, Texas, was termed "Operation Falcon". On March 18, 2003, Fátima del Socorro Leiva Medina and Edwin Alfredo Mancía Gonzales, illegal immigrants from El Salvador, alleged that they were chased, detained, threatened, robbed, and assaulted by Ranch Rescue operatives after being caught trespassing in the town of Hebbronville, Texas. One operative, Henry Mark Conner, allegedly aimed a rifle at Leiva and Mancía during the incident. He and Casey James Nethercott, another operative, were indicted on charges of aggravated assault and unlawful restraint. Nethercott was additionally indicted on charges of unlawful possession of a firearm by a felon. In 2011 the New York Times reported that Nethercott "has a string of assault and weapons convictions, and was once mentioned in Congressional testimony on abuses by bounty hunters for detaining at gunpoint two Southern California high school students on their way home from a football game."

Subsequent to the attacks, Leiva and Mancía sued the Texas chapter of Ranch Rescue. They were represented by attorneys from the Southern Poverty Law Center (SPLC) and the Mexican American Legal Defense and Education Fund, among others. They sued for damages relating to their physical injuries and emotional distress.

The judge in the case ruled in their favor. Joseph Sutton settled for $100,000, but neither Nethercott nor Ranch Rescue leader Jack Foote defended themselves in court. Nethercott was ordered to pay a default settlement of $850,000. Unable to pay the settlement, Nethercott was ordered to surrender his only asset —a 70-acre (28 ha) ranch near the Arizona-Sonora border. The case also caused a schism in the organization, with its founder, Jack Foote, publicly repudiating Nethercott.

In an action considered by some to be in response to this civil award, Arizona voters passed, in a favorable vote of 74.2% of votes cast, the Arizona Standing in Civil Actions, Proposition 102 (2006), preventing illegal immigrants from collecting punitive damages. This law, however, did not aid Ranch Rescue and, in 2011, Nethercott was quoted as saying, "If something happens with an illegal, and they try to sue you and get visas and amnesty, it won't work anymore. Nobody else will lose their home. That's what's important."

On September 15, 2004, while attempting to carry out an arrest warrant on Nethercott in Douglas, an FBI agent shot and wounded Kalen Riddle, one of his associates. Having been alienated from Ranch Rescue, Nethercott and Riddle were attempting to recruit members for a new organization with a similar purpose called Arizona Guard. After their arrest, both Nethercott and Riddle denied links with white supremacy despite Riddle's name appearing multiple times on white supremacist websites.

== See also ==
- Minuteman Project
- Minuteman Civil Defense Corps
- Save Our State
