= Posse Comitatus (organization) =

Extremist American anti-government movement

- Founders: William Potter Gale; Mike Beach
- Founded: 1960s
- Country: United States
- Ideology: Christian fascism (US)
- Political position: Far-right

The Posse Comitatus (Latin for 'force of the county') is a loosely organized American far-right extremist social movement which began in the late 1960s. Its members spread a conspiracy-minded, anti-government, and antisemitic message linked to white supremacy aiming to counter what they believe is an attack on their social and political rights as white Christians.

Many Posse members practiced survivalism and played a role in the formation of armed citizens' militias in the 1990s. The Posse Comitatus pioneered the use of false liens and other types of "paper terrorism" to harass their opponents by mounting frivolous legal actions against them. As the Posse Comitatus began their decline in popularity at the turn of the 21st century, their tactics and ideology evolved into those of the Christian Patriot movement and the sovereign citizen movement.

== Historical background ==
Due to the strong ties that they forged with the white supremacist Christian Identity movement, members of the Posse Comitatus believe that they are the true Israelites, the people who were chosen by God. They state that the Jews seek to help Satan destroy civilization and undermine white citizens' rights through the Federal Reserve and the Internal Revenue Service.

Posse charters were first issued in Portland, Oregon, in 1969 by Henry Lamont Beach, "a retired dry cleaner and a one-time member of the Silver Shirts, a Nazi-inspired and clerical fascist organization which was established in America after Hitler took power in Germany." One expert has considered William Potter Gale the founder of the movement.

Posse members believe that there is no legitimate form of government above that of the county level and no higher law authority than the county sheriff. If the sheriff refuses to carry out the will of the county's citizens, "he shall be removed by the Posse to the most populated intersection of streets in the township and at high noon be hung by the neck, the body remaining until sundown as an example to those who would subvert the law."

== Christian Identity ==
Some Posse members embraced the antisemitic and white supremacist beliefs of Christian Identity. Some believe that the U.S. federal government is illegitimate and in the hands of a Zionist Occupation Government, the supposed international Jewish conspiracy. Christian Posse Comitatus Newsletter has reported: "Our nation is now completely under the control of the International Invisible government of the World Jewry."

== Federal taxes ==
Members of the Posse Comitatus frequently refuse to pay taxes, obtain driver's licenses, or comply with regulatory authorities. They deny the validity of United States fiat money because it is not backed by gold, which they claim the Constitution requires.

They draw up unusual legal documents and attempt to record them, they declare their independence from the United States, or they claim to file "common law" liens against their perceived enemies such as Internal Revenue Service employees or judges. They are frequently involved in various tax protests, and they have invoked ideas that have been popularized by tax protesters.

== Criminal activities ==
The Posse Comitatus made national news when, on February 13, 1983, Posse member Gordon Kahl killed two federal marshals who had come to arrest him in North Dakota and became a fugitive. Another shootout ensued on June 3, 1983, in which Kahl and Lawrence County, Arkansas Sheriff Gene Matthews were killed. Other members of the group have also been convicted of crimes ranging from tax evasion and counterfeiting to threatening the lives of IRS agents and judges.

On October 23, 1984, Posse member Arthur Kirk, 49, was killed in a raid on his home.

The organization demonstrated support for its members over other issues. On September 2, 1975, Francis Earl Gillings, the founder of a San Joaquin County Posse group, led a group of armed Posse members to prevent United Farm Workers union organizers from attempting to organize non-union tomato pickers. As sheriff's deputies attempted to arrest Gillings on a traffic warrant, one got into a scuffle with Gillings, and a shot was fired.

On August 16, 2012, five suspects were arrested concerning the fatal shooting of two sheriff's deputies (Deputies Brandon Nielsen and Jeremy Triche) and wounding two others (Deputies Michael Scott Boyington and Jason Triche) in St. John the Baptist Parish, Louisiana. Terry Smith, 44; Brian Smith, 24; Derrick Smith, 22; Teniecha Bright, 21; and Kyle David Joekel, 28, were identified, with Brian Smith and Joekel (who was wounded by Deputy Charles "Chip" Wale) identified as the shooters in the incident. The men are rumored to be affiliated with a Posse Comitatus group. On August 17, 2012, two more suspects—Chanel Skains, 37, and Britney Keith, 23—were charged with accessory after the fact.

== Legacy ==
=== Christian Patriot movement ===
The direct ideological descendants of the Posse Comitatus movement were found in the "Christian Patriot" branch of the Patriot movement. Most Christian Patriot groups adhere to Christian Identity's white supremacist views and the Posse Comitatus' view that the American government had deprived citizens of their natural "common law" rights. They have notably espoused Gale's concept of "individual sovereignty", which developed into the broader sovereign citizen movement.

=== Sovereign citizens ===
The legal theories of Posse Comitatus have been further developed by the sovereign citizen movement, which claims that a U.S. citizen can become a "sovereign citizen" and thereby be subject only to common law or "constitutional law," not to statutory law (including most taxes). The Uniform Commercial Code plays a part in these legal theories. The term "sovereign citizen" began to supplant the name "Posse Comitatus" by the late 1990s, mirroring movement members' renewed focus on personal liberty.

Some within the movement see African Americans, who only gained legal citizenship after the Civil War and passage of the 14th Amendment, as "14th Amendment citizens" with fewer rights than whites. However, African American groups have adopted sovereign citizen ideology and developed a version of the movement's beliefs.

The sovereign citizen movement in turn gave rise to the "redemption movement," which claims that the U.S. government has enslaved its citizens by using them as collateral against the foreign debt. Redemption scheme promoters sell instructions explaining how citizens can "free" themselves by filing particular government forms in a particular order using particular wording. The movement "has earned its promoters untold profits, buried courts and other agencies under tons of worthless paper, and led to scores of arrests and convictions."

Sovereign citizen ideology eventually spread to Canada where it gave birth during the 2000s to a local offshoot known as the freeman on the land movement.

The United States Federal Bureau of Investigation (FBI) classifies some sovereign citizens ("extreme sovereign citizen extremists") as a domestic terrorist movement. In 2010 the Southern Poverty Law Center (SPLC) estimated that approximately 100,000 Americans were "hard-core sovereign believers" with another 200,000 "just starting out by testing sovereign techniques for resisting everything from speeding tickets to drug charges."

== Alpine County, California ==
In the late 1970s, the Posse Comitatus attempted to take over Alpine County, California, by settling there and fielding candidates in local elections.

Alpine County is in the Sierra Nevada Mountains east of Stockton on the west and east slope of Ebbetts Pass on State Highway 4. The 2010 population is 1,175 people. The posse thought winning local elections in Alpine County was their best opportunity to take control of a single county. The group fielded a candidate for sheriff and registered fictitious voters using post office boxes and vacant lots as their addresses. Six people were prosecuted for voter fraud, the false registration thrown out, and the incumbent sheriff was re-elected.

== Tigerton, Wisconsin ==
The posse had a presence in Tigerton, Wisconsin, until a crackdown by government prosecutors in the early 1980s left many of the group's leaders imprisoned.

== See also ==
- American militia movement
- Antisemitism in the United States
- Christian Patriot movement
- Constitutional Sheriffs and Peace Officers Association
- David Wynn Miller
- Family Farm Preservation
- Northwest Territorial Imperative
- Montana Freemen
- Bundy standoff
- James Wickstrom
- Terrorism in the United States

== Sources ==
- Neiwert, David A. (2009). The Eliminationists: how hate talk radicalized the American right. Sausalito, CA : [LaVergne, TN]: PoliPoint Press; Distributed by Ingram Publisher Services. ISBN 978-0-9815769-8-5.
