= American militia movement =

Political movement of paramilitary groups in the US

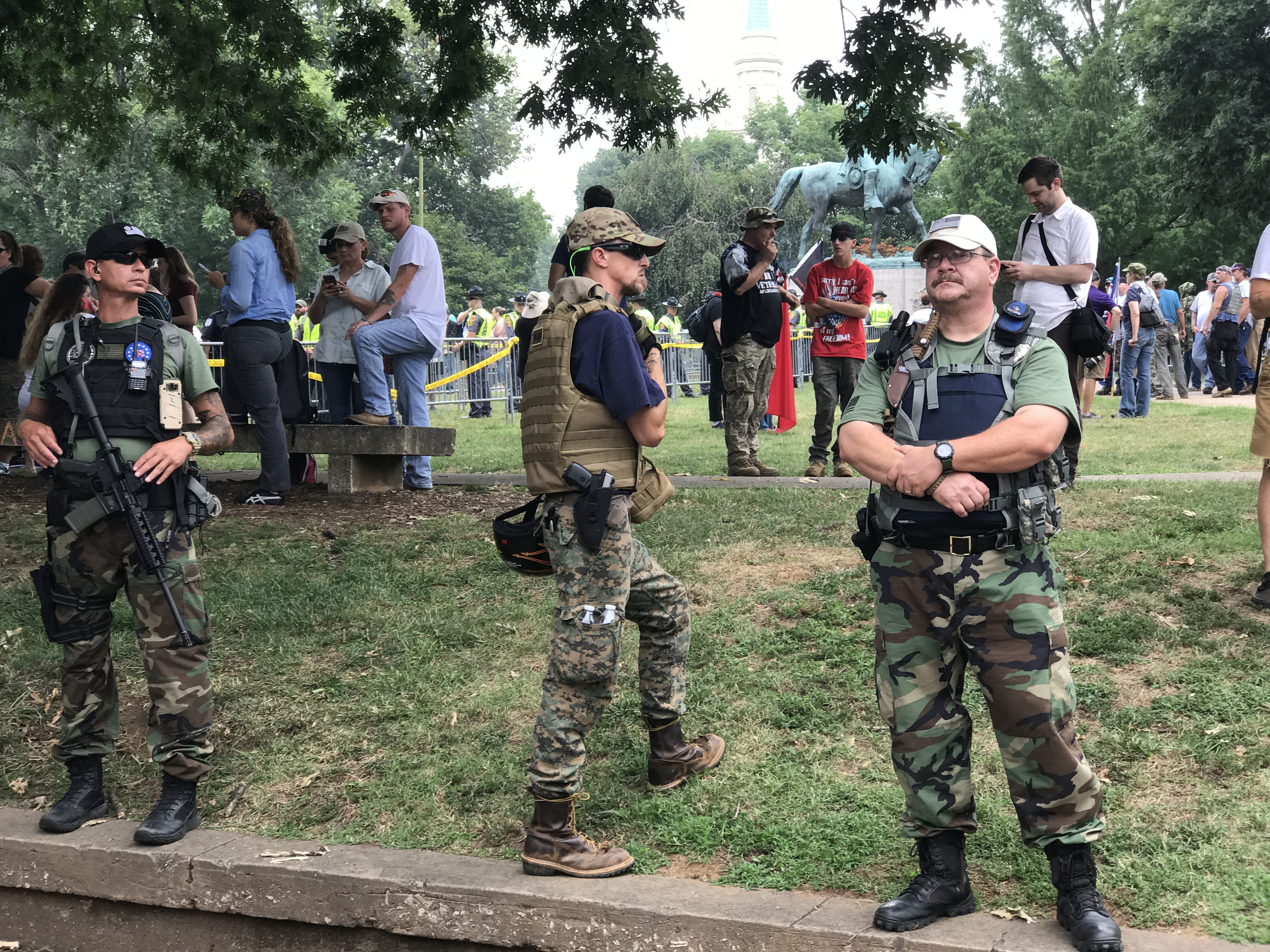
"Three Percenters" patrol Market Street Park (then known as Emancipation Park) in Charlottesville, Virginia during the 2017 Unite the Right rally

American militia movement is a term which is used by law enforcement and security analysts in reference to a number of private organizations that include paramilitary or similar elements. These groups may refer to themselves as militia, unorganized militia, and constitutional militia. While groups such as the Posse Comitatus existed as early as the 1980s, the movement gained momentum only after standoffs with government agents in the early 1990s. By the mid-1990s, such groups were active in all 50 US states, with membership estimated at between 20,000 and 60,000. The movement is most closely associated with the American right-wing. Most modern organizations calling themselves militias are illegal private paramilitary organizations that would require official sanctioning of a state government in order to be constitutional.

== History ==
The catalysts of the American militia movement started with the FBI's 1992 shootout with Randy Weaver at Ruby Ridge, Idaho, and the 1993 Waco siege in which David Koresh and the Branch Davidians were involved at Mt. Carmel in Waco, Texas. Critic Mark Pitcavage described the predecessors of the modern militia movement:

The militia movement is a right-wing movement that arose following controversial standoffs in the 1990s. It inherited paramilitary traditions of earlier groups, especially the conspiratorial, anti-government Posse Comitatus. The militia movement claims that militia groups are sanctioned by law but uncontrolled by government; in fact, they are designed to oppose a tyrannical government. The movement's ideology has led some adherents to commit criminal acts, including stockpiling illegal weapons and explosives and plotting to destroy buildings or assassinate public officials, as well as lesser confrontations.

The Oklahoma City bombing on April 19, 1995, the second anniversary of the Waco fire, drew nationwide attention to the militia movement because Timothy McVeigh was associated with the Michigan Militia; he possibly even attended meetings before the attack. This increased public scrutiny and law enforcement pressure, and brought in more recruits due to the heightened awareness of the movement.

In March 1996, agents of the FBI and other law enforcement organizations surrounded the 960-acre (390 ha) eastern Montana "Justus Township" compound of the Montana Freemen. The Freemen were a group of sovereign citizens that included elements of the Christian Identity ideology, espoused common law legal theories, and rejected the legitimacy of the Federal Reserve. Montana legislator Karl Ohs mediated through the standoff. Both Randy Weaver (one of the besieged at Ruby Ridge) and Bo Gritz (a civilian negotiator at Ruby Ridge) had attempted to talk to the group but had given up in frustration, as did Colorado Senator Charlie Duke when he had attempted negotiations. A break finally came when far-right political leaders abandoned the group to their fate. The group surrendered peacefully after an 81-day standoff and 14 of the Freemen faced criminal charges relating to circulating millions of dollars in bogus checks and threatening the life of a federal judge. The peaceful resolution of this and other standoffs after Ruby Ridge and Waco have been credited by some to the creation of the Critical Incident Response Group (CIRG) in the U.S. Department of Justice in 1994.

A 1999 US Department of Justice analysis of the potential militia threat at the millennium conceded that the vast majority of militias were reactive (not proactive) and posed no threat. By 2001, the militia movement seemed to be in decline, having peaked in 1996 with 858 groups. As a result of the 2008 financial crisis and the election of Barack Obama as United States president in 2008, militia activity experienced a resurgence. Militia groups have recently been involved in several high-profile standoffs, including the Bundy Standoff in 2014 and the Occupation of the Malheur National Wildlife Refuge in 2016.

Many militia groups strongly supported the candidacy and presidency of Donald Trump, with their focus on anti-government sentiment being replaced with opposing perceived enemies of Trump who were often alleged to be deeply imbedded within the bureaucracy or "deep state". Starting in 2020, militia groups were heavily involved in rallies against COVID-19-related restrictions, gun control measures, and Black Lives Matter (BLM) protests. After Trump's loss in the 2020 presidential election, many militia groups mobilized to protest the results, including large scale participation in the "Stop The Steal" movement, promoting false claims that the election result was fraudulent.

In the storming of the US Capitol on January 6, 2021, members with ties to various militia groups participated in the attack. In recent years, there have been increasing incidents in which Republicans aligned themselves with militia groups in exchange for their support.

On January 11, 2024, Congressman Jamie Raskin and Senator Ed Markey proposed the Preventing Private Paramilitary Activity Act as an attempt to federally prohibit "publicly patrolling, drilling, or engaging in [harmful paramilitary tactics]" and "falsely assuming the functions of law enforcement." The bill has not yet been codified into law.

=== Legal legitimacy ===
Most militia organizations envisage themselves as legally legitimate organizations, despite the fact that all 50 states prohibit private paramilitary activity. Others subscribe to the "insurrection theory" which describes the right of the body politic to rebel against the established government in the face of tyranny.

=== Opposition to the government ===
Beliefs within the militia movement encompass a combination of ideologies and positions commonly associated with various groups, including the sovereign citizens movement, the 1960s tax protest movement, the John Birch Society, the Tea Party movement, and since 2016, Trumpism. These beliefs often revolve around anti-government sentiments, opposition to perceived encroachments on individual rights, and skepticism towards established institutions. The militia movement has gained attention for its advocacy of armed resistance and its involvement in controversial incidents, such as standoffs with law enforcement. Not all individuals who identify with the militia movement share the same beliefs or engage in illegal activities.

While militia organizations vary in their ideologies and objectives, with many high-profile organizations espousing anti-tax, anti-immigration, survivalist, sovereign citizen, libertarian, land rights views, they generally share a common belief in the imminent or actual rise of a tyrannical global socialist government in the United States which, they believe, must be confronted through armed force. This tyrannical government is linked to the New World Order conspiracy theory and is named by the militiamen as the eponymous conspiracy theory.

== Groups part of the militia movement ==
The Southern Poverty Law Center identified 334 militia groups at a peak in 2011. It identified 276 in 2015, up from 202 in 2014 and in 2022 nearly 200 groups still exist, down from 2015.

United States militia movement groups
Group name	Area	Beliefs	Ref.
3 Percenters	Nationwide	Right-libertarianism (majority); Patriot movement Second Amendment Constitutionalism	
Arizona Border Recon	Arizona		
Hutaree	Michigan, southern	Christian nationalism Christian Patriot movement	
Idaho Light Foot Militia	Idaho, statewide	Patriot movement	
Michigan Militia	Michigan, Redford	Patriot movement	
Militia of Montana	Montana, Noxon	American constitutionalism American nationalism Accelerationism	
Missouri Citizens Militia	Missouri, statewide		
Missouri Militia	Missouri, Kansas City		
New York Light Foot Militia	New York, statewide	Patriot movement	
Oath Keepers	Nationwide	Patriot movement	
Ohio Defense Force	Ohio, statewide		
Pennsylvania Light Foot Militia	Pennsylvania		
Texas Light Foot Militia	Texas, statewide		
Veterans on Patrol	Nationwide	Patriot movement QAnon	

=== Constitutionalists ===
The constitutionalist wing of the American militia movement became active in the mid 1990s in a response of outrage about the violent confrontation at Ruby Ridge, the Waco Siege and gun control legislation. The movement is composed largely of veterans, libertarians, and Second Amendment advocates who share a common belief in individual liberties and civil responsibilities, according to their interpretation of the U.S. Constitution, as well as disdain for what are perceived to be abusive, usurpative, or tyrannical federal government decisions and actions, and a set of ideals associated with the values of the militia they see embodied in the Constitution. From the inception of the modern movement there has been controversy over whether the movement was an important part of a complete response to many important threats, or a threat in itself.

Scholars Stanley C. Weeber and Daniel G. Rodeheaver offer a description of the constitutionalist militia movement that identifies four types:

1. The Open Constitutionalist, with the Cascade Brigade as an example
2. Constitutionalist/Command Structure, with the Alabama Constitutional Militia and the Michigan Militia as examples
3. Constitutionalist/Cell Structure, with the Militia of Montana and the Texas Constitutional Militia as examples
4. Underground/ No Public Contact, with the Sons of Liberty (Alabama) as an example

Other writers view constitutionalism as the movement, having a militia wing, rather than a militia movement with a constitutionalist wing.

Throughout American history, there have been other constitutionalist revivals in opposition to various government actions. Some writers have asserted that the modern revival of the constitutional militia movement began as early as 1958 but that, in this early phase, it was associated ideologically with the white supremacist Christian Identity movement mixed with constitutionalist elements. A fear of Communism was prevalent in the United States during the Twentieth Century, against which was set the modern revival of the constitutional militia movement. These militia revivals believed in the sanctity of the U.S. Constitution, and that certain groups are conspiring to destroy America. Unlike the Christian Identity groups, the Constitutionalist militias generally resist casting blame on ethnic, racial or religious groups, but rather blame influential individuals or groups of individuals (e.g., the Bilderberg Group, the Trilateral Commission) who promote globalization, collectively known as the New World Order. The Posse Comitatus is an exception to this principle, however, as it adheres to the antisemitic theory of the Zionist Occupation Government.

Conceptually, a citizen's militia has been defined as a constitutionalist private army meeting regularly to practice combat skills and discuss weapons. The militia is defined as social groups practice "skills within a distinct territory, are not always anti-government, and have some opinions regarding use of terrorism to further militia goals." It may have an offensive, paramilitary, and/or defensive orientation depending on circumstances.

Operational features listed in the book Militias in the New Millennium include the following:

1. Training in combat scenarios and weaponry skills in mock actions and maneuvers
2. Has an identifiable territory in which members reside
3. Bases organization philosophies on anti-government rhetoric
4. Development of contingency plans in case of governmental provocation
5. Considers bombing, kidnappings, separatism, "paper terrorism", or other extreme measures to protect the organic Constitution
6. Considers the viability of criminal activity to acquire weapons and explosives

== See also ==
- Guerrilla warfare
- Gun politics in the United States
- Leaderless resistance
- Minutemen
- Private military company
  - List of private military contractors
- Mercenary
- Paleolibertarianism
- Political violence in the United States
- Radicalism in the United States
  - Radical right (United States)
- Right Wing Death Squad
- Terrorism in the United States
  - Domestic terrorism in the United States
- The Turner Diaries – Militia related literature describing a fictional civil war in the USA.
