= Terrorism in the United States =

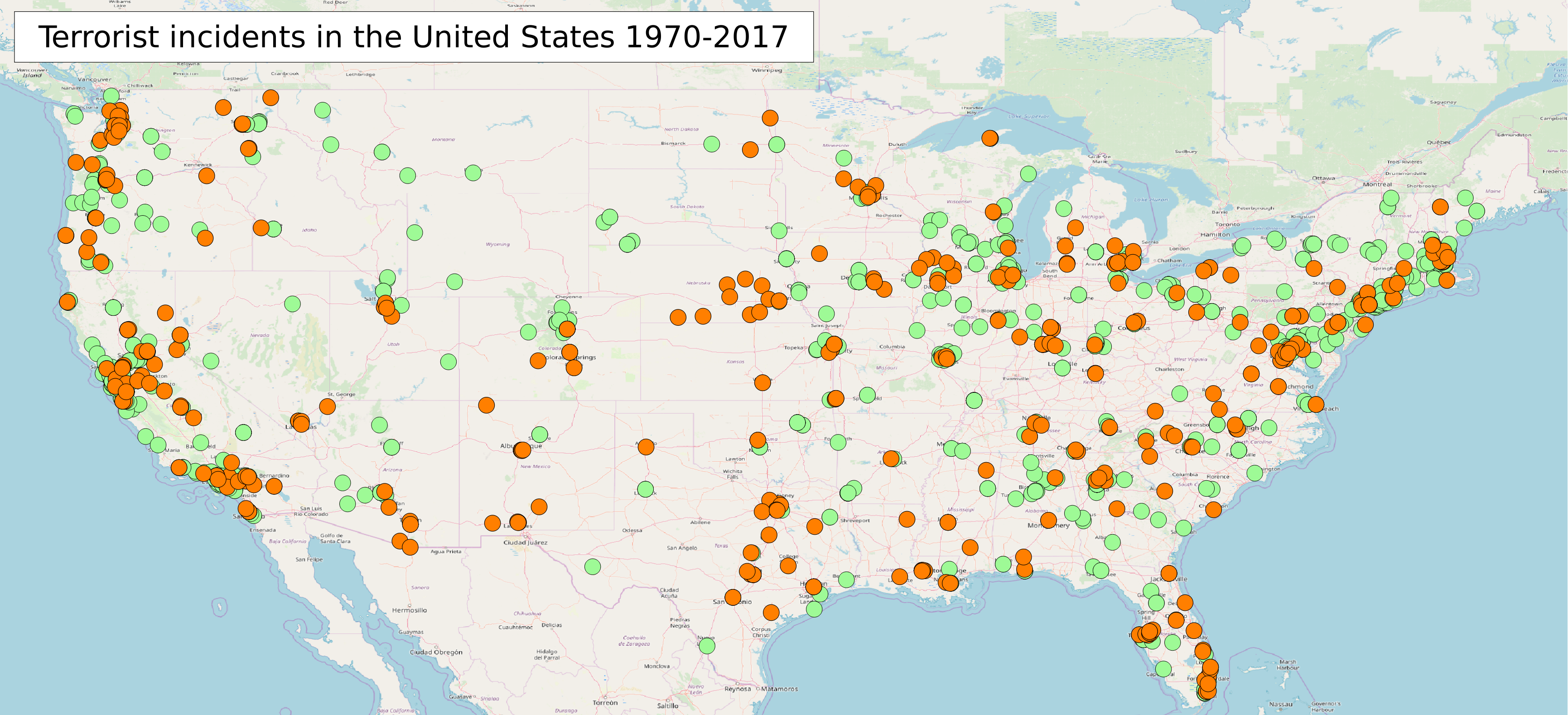
Map of 2,872 terrorist incidents in the contiguous United States from 1970 to 2017. KEY: Orange: 2001–2017; Green: 1970–2000

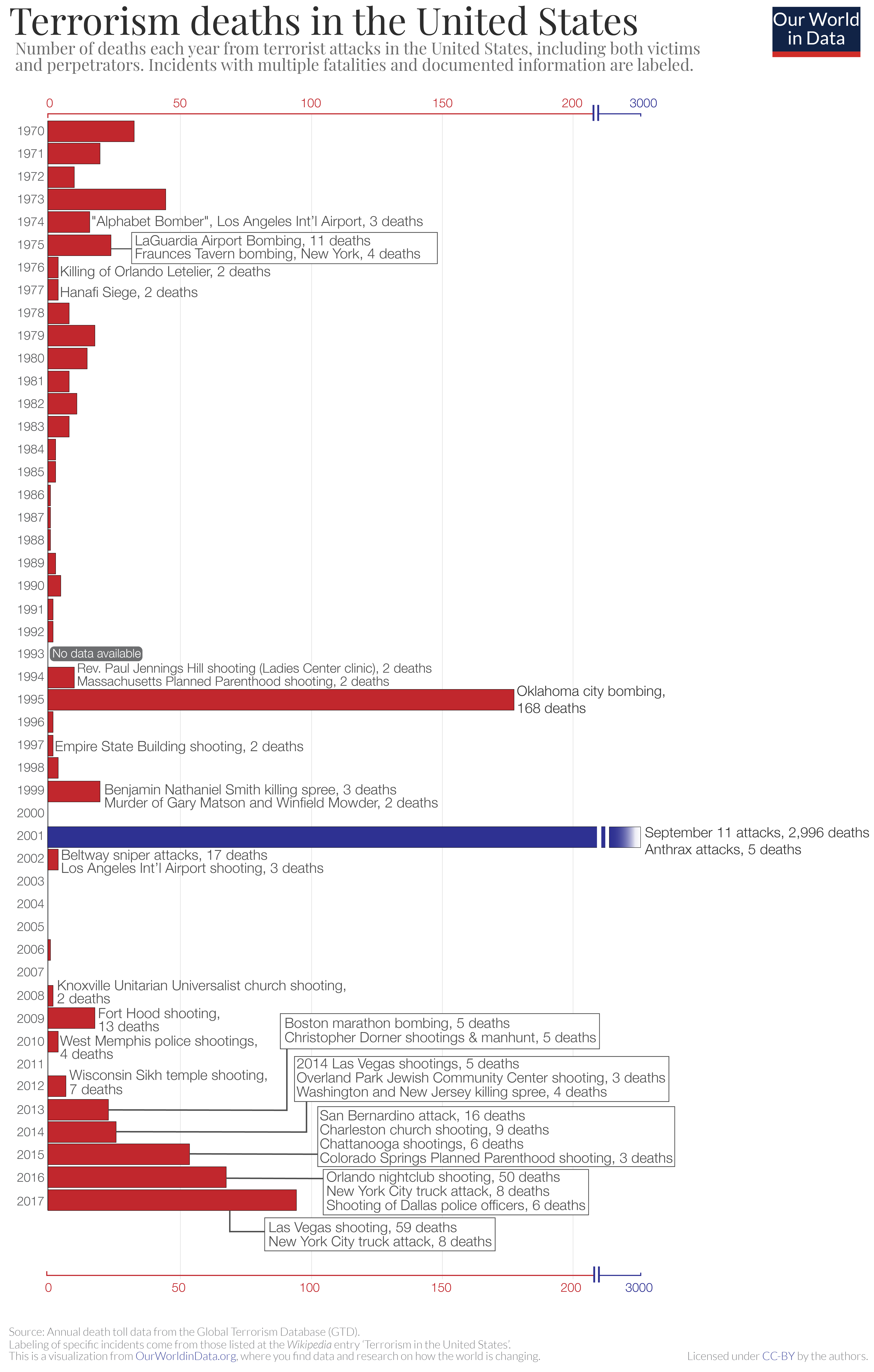
Terrorism deaths in the United States

In the United States, terrorism is defined as the systematic or threatened use of violence in order to create a climate of fear with the goal of intimidating a population or government and thereby spurring political, religious, or ideological change. This article serves as a list and a compilation of acts of terrorism, attempts to commit acts of terrorism, and other such items which pertain to terrorist activities which are engaged in by non-state actors or spies who are acting in the interests of state actors or persons who are acting without the approval of foreign governments within the domestic borders of the United States.

During the American Civil War, pro-Confederate Bushwhackers and pro-Union Jayhawkers in Missouri and Kansas respectively engaged in cross border raids, committed acts of violence against civilians and soldiers, stole goods, and burned farms down. The most infamous event was the 1863 Lawrence Massacre in Lawrence, Kansas, on August 21, 1863, when around 150 people were killed by Quantrill's Raiders because of the town's anti-slavery sentiment. Other acts of terrorism which occurred during the war included the 1863 Chesapeake Affair and the 1864 St. Albans Raid, the former being committed by British subjects.

Since the end of the Civil War, organized groups or lone wolf white supremacists have committed many acts of domestic terrorism against African Americans. This form of terrorism has consisted of expulsions, lynchings, hate crimes, shootings, bombings and other acts of violence. Such acts of violence overwhelmingly occurred in the Southern United States, and they included acts of violence which were committed by the Ku Klux Klan (KKK). Acts of white supremacist terrorism include the Wilmington massacre of 1898, the East St. Louis massacre of 1917, the Elaine massacre of 1919, the Ocoee massacre of 1920, the Tulsa race massacre of 1921, and the Rosewood massacre of 1923.

A 2017 report by the U.S. Government Accountability Office found that out of the 85 deadly extremist incidents which had occurred since the September 11 attacks (9/11) in 2001, white supremacist groups were responsible for 73%, while radical Islamist extremists were responsible for 27%. The total number of deaths caused by each group was about the same. However, 41% of the deaths that were attributable to radical Islamists all occurred in a single event: the 2016 Orlando nightclub shooting in which 49 people were killed. No deaths were attributed to left-wing groups. The Department of Homeland Security reported in 2020 that white supremacists posed the top domestic terrorism threat, which FBI director Christopher Wray confirmed in 2021, noting that the bureau had elevated the threat to the same level as ISIS.

== Totals in the U.S. ==
Terrorist incidents in the United States
Year	Number of incidents	Deaths	Injuries
2017	65	95	932
2016	64	68	139
2015	38	54	58
2014	29	26	19
2013	20	23	436
2012	20	7	7
2011	10	0	2
2010	17	4	17
2009	11	18	41
2008	18	2	13
2007	8	0	0
2006	6	1	14
2005	21	0	0
2004	9	0	0
2003	33	0	0
2002	33	4	11
2001	41	3,008	16,515
2000	32	0	7
1999	53	20	40
1998	31	4	3
1997	40	2	18
1996	35	2	119
1995	60	178	738
1994	55	10	16
1993	36	10	1,005
1992	32	2	3
1991	30	2	4
1990	32	5	7
1989	42	3	14
1988	27	1	1
1987	34	1	1
1986	49	1	36
1985	40	3	13
1984	63	3	780
1983	44	8	5
1982	78	11	37
1981	74	8	15
1980	67	15	22
1979	69	18	58
1978	87	8	8
1977	130	4	17
1976	105	4	41
1975	149	24	158
1974	94	16	54
1973	58	45	33
1972	68	10	35
1971	247	20	55
1970	468	33	160
Total	2,872	3,781	21,707

A 2017 report by The Nation Institute and the Center for Investigative Reporting analyzed a list of the terrorist incidents which occurred in the US between 2008 and 2016. It found:

- 115 far-right inspired terrorist incidents. 35% of these incidents were foiled (this number means that no terrorist attacks occurred) and 29% of them resulted in fatalities. These incidents caused 79 deaths.
- 63 Islamist inspired terrorist incidents. 76% of these terrorist incidents were foiled (this number means that no terrorist attacks occurred) and 13% of them resulted in fatalities. These incidents caused 90 deaths.
- 19 far-left inspired terrorist incidents. 20% of these terrorist incidents were foiled (this number means that no terrorist attacks occurred) and 10% of them resulted in fatalities. Two of these incidents were described as "plausibly" attributed to a perpetrator with left-wing sympathies and caused 7 deaths. These are not included in the official government database.

According to a report which is based on Justice Department figures which were released by the U.S. government in January 2018, about three out of four people who were convicted on charges of international terrorism between September 11, 2001, to December 31, 2016, were foreign-born. According to the Justice Department, 549 people were convicted on charges of international terrorism, including 254 people who were citizens of other countries, 148 people were naturalized citizens and 148 people were natural-born-citizens. In a speech made before a joint session of Congress on February 28, 2017, President Donald Trump incorrectly attributed these findings to domestic terrorism; in actuality, the findings were based on cases in which international terrorists may have been brought to the United States for prosecution.

In 2015, the Triangle Center on Terrorism and Homeland Security and the Police Executive Research Forum conducted a nationwide survey of 382 police and sheriff departments. Nearly 74% of respondents stated that anti-government violence was their top concern with regard to threats from violent extremists, while about 39% of respondents stated that "Al Qaeda-inspired" violence was their top concern.

In the 2010s, the national conversation on terrorism largely focused on Islamic extremist acts, however, law enforcement groups made it clear that Muslim extremists perpetrate a minute percentage of the ideologically based terrorist attacks which are perpetrated in the United States. Since November 9, 2001, only about 9 American Muslims per year have taken part in terrorist plots in the United States, in total, 20 incidents resulted in about 50 deaths. A 2012 study showed that in about the same time period right-wing extremists were responsible for about 337 attacks per year, in total, they killed more than 5 times the number of people killed by Muslims in the United States.

The National Consortium for the Study of Terrorism and Responses to Terrorism maintains Profiles of Individual Radicalization in the United States, a database which contains over 1,800 profiles of individuals who have been radicalized by ideologies since 1948. The database shows that from 1948 through 2016, 40.0% of identified extremists were far-right, 24.5% of identified extremists were Islamist and 17.4% of identified extremists were far-left, while 18.2% of identified extremists were "single issue" individuals.

In May 2019 and for the first time in its history, the FBI identified fringe conspiracy theories as a potential source of domestic terrorism, it specifically cited QAnon.

A June 2020 study of domestic terrorist incidents by the Center for Strategic and International Studies (CSIS) reported that during the previous 25 years, the majority of attacks and plots were perpetrated and hatched by far-right attackers. This trend has accelerated in recent years, with this sector being responsible for about 66% of all of the attacks and plots which were perpetrated in 2019, and it was also responsible for 90% of all of those attacks which were perpetrated in 2020. The next most potentially dangerous group has been "religious extremists", the majority "Salafi jihadists inspired by the Islamic State and al-Qaeda", while the number planned by the far left has reduced to a minute fraction since the mid-2000s.

In October 2020, the Department of Homeland Security released the Homeland Threat Assessment, a report detailing various domestic threats to US national security. It states that, out of all domestic terror attacks resulting in lethal threats to life between 2018 and 2019, "WSEs [white supremacist extremists] conducted half of all lethal attacks (8 of 16), resulting in the majority of deaths (39 of 48)".

Soon after the assassination of Charlie Kirk, U.S. President Trump claimed that "the radicals on the left are the problem" with political violence. Opinion editors, as well as both far-right commentators and Trump critics, have compared Charlie Kirk's killing to the Reichstag fire—the 1933 arson of the German parliament building that Hitler used as a pretext to suspend civil liberties and prosecute political opposition—some calling Kirk's killing Trump's "Reichstag fire moment". How Democracies Die author, professor Steven Levitsky, said that exploiting Charlie Kirk's killing to justify unleashing attacks on critics is "page one of the authoritarian playbook".

== Attacks by type ==
=== Anti-abortion violence ===
Since 1997, there have been 8 murders, 17 attempted murders, 42 bombings, and 186 arson attacks aimed at abortion clinics and multiple providers across the US. In some cases small groups of clinics have been attacked multiple times.

- 1991: The Central Ohio Women's Clinic that was housed in a building owned by the Planned Parenthood of Central Ohio in Columbus, Ohio was burned by members of the Christian Liberation Army, with damages estimates $75,000 in damages. Nine days later threw a firebomb into the Capital Care Women's Center in Columbus, Ohio, leaving damages sustained $250,000 in damages.
- 1993: Dr. David Gunn was murdered by anti-abortion extremist and Christian fundamentalist, Michael F. Griffin.
- 1994: Abortion provider Dr. John Britton and James Barrett (both murdered) and his wife June (shot but survived) became victims of Reverend Paul Jennings Hill.
- 1996–1998: Anti-abortion extremist Eric Rudolph cited biblical passages as his motivation for a series of bombings, including Atlanta's Olympic Centennial Park, a lesbian bar, and several abortion clinics. Rudolph acknowledges his attacks were religiously motivated, but denies that his brief association with the racist Christian Identity movement was a motivation for his attacks.
- 1996: Dr. Calvin Jackson of New Orleans, Louisiana was stabbed 15 times, losing 4 pints of blood. Donald Cooper was charged with second degree attempted murder and was sentenced to 20 years. "Donald Cooper's Day of Violence", by Kara Lowentheil, Choice! Magazine, December 21, 2004
- 1998: Anti-abortion extremist James Kopp murdered Dr. Barnett Slepian and went on a series of anti-abortion shooting sprees, both in the U.S. and Canada.
- 2006: David McMenemy of Rochester Hills, Michigan, crashed his car into the Edgerton Women's Care Center in Davenport, Iowa. He then doused the lobby in gasoline and started a fire. McMenemy committed these acts in the belief that the center was performing abortions; however, Edgerton is not an abortion clinic. Time magazine listed the incident in a "Top 10 Inept Terrorist Plots" list.
- 2009: Anti-abortion extremist Scott Roeder murdered Dr. George Tiller in Kansas.
- 2015: Robert Lewis Dear killed three people in a shooting at a Planned Parenthood clinic in Colorado Springs, Colorado. At his court hearings Dear declared himself a "warrior for the babies".

=== Antisemitism ===
- October 12, 1958: Bombing of the Hebrew Benevolent Congregation Temple of Atlanta, Georgia. The acts were carried out by white supremacists.
- June 18, 1984: Alan Berg, a Jewish lawyer-talk show host was shot and killed in the driveway of his home on Capitol Hill, Denver, Colorado, by members of a neo-Nazi group called The Order. Earlier and on the show, Berg had stridently argued with a member of the group who was later convicted of his murder.
- 1977 Washington, D.C. attack and hostage taking of Jewish hostages at the B'nai B'rith by members of a black Muslim group that had split away from the Nation of Islam.
- August 10, 1999: Los Angeles Jewish Community Center shooting in Granada Hills, California of Los Angeles. 5 people were wounded in the Jewish community center and its daycare facility. The gunman, Buford O. Furrow had antisemitic and anti-government views. Shortly thereafter, Furrow murdered a mail carrier, fled the state, and finally surrendered to authorities.
- June 10, 2009: United States Holocaust Memorial Museum shooting: 88-year-old James Wenneker von Brunn, a white supremacist and neo-Nazi, walked into the U.S. Holocaust Memorial Museum in Washington, D.C., shooting and mortally wounding Stephen Tyrone Johns, a security guard. Von Brunn was wounded when other museum guards immediately returned fire and on January 6, 2010, while he was awaiting trial, von Brunn died of natural causes in a hospital which was located near the prison where he was being held. During the investigation it was discovered that von Brunn had planned to target White House senior adviser David Axelrod leading to increased protection for Axelrod and other steps.
- April 13, 2014: Overland Park Jewish Community Center shooting: 3 killed in shootings at Jewish Community Center of Greater Kansas City and Village Shalom in Overland Park, Kansas. Suspect is 74-year-old Frazier Glenn Miller, Jr. On April 27, 2015, Miller told the Associated Press that he planned to plead guilty and he also stated that his motivation was to "put the Jews on trial where they belong".
- January 10, 2018: Murder of Blaze Bernstein: A 19 year old gay Jewish student from the University of Pennsylvania was killed by a former classmate and member of the neo-Nazi terrorist organization Atomwaffen Division in Orange County, California.
- October 27, 2018: Pittsburgh synagogue shooting: A mass shooting occurred at Tree of Life – Or L'Simcha Congregation in the Squirrel Hill neighborhood of Pittsburgh, Pennsylvania, on October 27, 2018, while a service was being held. Eleven people were killed, and six were injured. The sole suspect, 46-year-old Robert Gregory Bowers, was arrested and charged with 29 federal crimes and 36 state crimes.
- April 27, 2019: Poway synagogue shooting: A 19 year old nursing student, inspired by the Pittsburgh synagogue shooting in Pittsburgh, Pennsylvania and the Christchurch mosque shootings in Christchurch, New Zealand, announced his plans to shoot up the synagogue on 8chan by posting an open letter. One woman was killed, and three were injured.
- December 10, 2019: Jersey City Kosher Grocery Shooting: Three people were shot and killed in a kosher grocery store in Jersey City by two heavily armed assailants, David N. Anderson and Francine Graham. The assailants wounded another customer and two police officers before being killed by police. It was determined in the subsequent investigation that the Anderson and Francine had planned a much larger attack on the Jewish community.

=== Environmental terrorism ===
- University of Washington firebombing incident
- 1989 California medfly attack
- Unabomber

=== Islamic extremism ===
- September 11, 2001, perpetrated by foreign national al-Qaeda members:
  - (New York City): Hijackers take control of two commercial jets containing passengers and fuel, flying them into the World Trade Center, killing hundreds on impact and an additional 2,606 when the towers subsequently collapsed. More than 6,000 people were injured.
  - (Arlington County, Virginia): 5 Hijackers fly a Boeing 757-223 containing 53 passengers and 6 crew into the Pentagon, killing all 64 aboard and an additional 125 people on the ground.
  - (Stonycreek Township, Somerset County, Pennsylvania): 33 passengers and 7 crew are killed after attempting to regain control from four hijackers that planned to fly the Boeing 757 into either the U.S. Capitol building or the White House. All 44 occupants died on impact after hijackers forced the plane into a nose dive.
- June 1, 2009: Little Rock recruiting office shooting, (Little Rock, AR): A US-born convert to Islam shoots a local soldier to death inside a recruiting center explicitly in the name of Allah.
- November 5, 2009: Fort Hood shooting, Ft. Hood, Texas: A Muslim Palestinian-American psychiatrist guns down thirteen unarmed soldiers while yelling praises to Allah.
- April 15, 2013: Boston Marathon bombing (Boston, MA): Foreign-born Muslims detonate two bombs packed with ball bearings at the Boston Marathon, killing three people and causing several more to lose limbs.
- September 25, 2014: Vaughan Foods beheading incident, (Moore, OK): A US-born convert and Sharia advocate beheads a woman after calling for Islamic terror and posting an Islamist beheading photo.
- July 16, 2015: Chattanooga shootings, Chattanooga, Tennessee: A Kuwaiti-born Muslim commits a shooting spree at a recruiting center at a strip mall and a naval center, leaving five soldiers dead at the latter location.
- November 4, 2015: University of California, Merced stabbing attack by Islamist extremist
- December 2, 2015: San Bernardino attack, San Bernardino, California: A couple opens fire at a Christmas party, leaving fourteen dead.
- January 7, 2016: Shooting of Jesse Hartnett, Philadelphia police officer Jesse Hartnett is ambushed by a gunman who later pledged allegiance to ISIS.
- February 11, 2016: Ohio restaurant machete attack by Islamist extremist
- June 12, 2016: Orlando nightclub shooting, Orlando, Florida: Omar Mateen shoots and kills 49 people and injures 58 more at a gay bar, the largest mass shooting in U.S. history at the time.
- November 28, 2016: Ohio State University attack, Columbus, Ohio: A Somali student, Abdul Artan, who moved to the U.S. as a refugee, intentionally rammed a car into pedestrians on a busy campus sidewalk on Monday morning and then began slashing passers-by with a butcher knife, the authorities said, injuring 11 students and faculty and staff members.
- October 31, 2017: New York City truck attack, New York City: 29-year-old Sayfullo Habibullaevich Saipov rented a Home Depot pickup truck and intentionally drove it through a bicycle path. He crashed into a school bus and then exited the vehicle wielding look-a-like weapons. He was shot by NYPD. 8 people were killed and 12 were injured.
- December 6, 2019: Naval Air Station Pensacola shooting, Pensacola, Florida: A second lieutenant of the Saudi Royal Air Force training at the Naval Air Station in Pensacola opened fire in one of the classroom buildings killing 3 and wounding 8 others before being shot dead by responding police officers.
- May 21, 2020: Corpus Christi, Texas: At the Naval Air Station Corpus Christi, Adam Alsahi crashed through a northern perimeter gate at NAS Corpus Christi, activating vehicle barriers. The driver then got out and opened fire before being shot and killed. A Navy police officer was shot but was protected by a ballistic vest. Alsahi had expressed support for terrorist networks including ISIS. The FBI announced the incident as terrorism-related.
- January 1, 2025: New Orleans truck attack, New Orleans, Louisiana: Shamsud-Din Jabbar drove a truck into a crowd of people on Bourbon Street and Canal Street, killing 14 people and injuring another 57. He then got out of the truck and shot at the police before being shot and killed. The police found more guns, a bomb, and an ISIS flag in the truck.

=== Left-wing and anti-government extremism ===
- September 6, 1901: President William McKinley was assassinated by Michigan born Russian-Polish anarchist, Leon Czolgosz, in Buffalo, New York.
- November 24, 1917: A bomb explodes in a Milwaukee police station, killing nine officers and a civilian. Anarchists were suspected.
- April through June 1919: A series of bombings and attempted bombings by Galleanist anarchists. Targets included anti-immigration politicians, anti-anarchist officials, prominent businessmen, a journalist and a church.
- September 16, 1920: Wall Street bombing: The explosion killed 30 people, and another 10 later died of wounds from the blast. 143 were seriously injured.
- 1969–1977: The Weather Underground, a radical socialist movement, committed dozens of bombings and other terrorist activities over this time period. List of Weatherman actions
- August 7, 1969: Twenty were injured by radical leftist Sam Melville in a bombing of the Marine Midland Building in New York City.
- September 18, 1969: The Federal Building in New York City was bombed by radical leftist Jane Alpert.
- October 7, 1969: Fifth floor of the Armed Forces Induction Center in New York City was devastated by explosion attributed to radical leftist Jane Alpert.
- November 12, 1969: A bomb was detonated in the Manhattan Criminal Court building in New York City. Jane Alpert, Sam Melville, and 3 other militant radical leftists were arrested hours later.
- 1971–1975: The New World Liberation Front was a radical left-wing group in the San Francisco area in the 1970s that conducted multiple bombings in the Bay area over a 3-year period. They claim nearly 50 successful bombings.
- March 1, 1971: The radical leftist group Weather Underground exploded a bomb in the United States Capitol to protest the U.S. invasion of Laos.
- January 2–4, 1973: A bomb exploded at a United States Navy recruiting center in Portland, Oregon and two days later an Army recruiting center in the same city was dynamited by a group of anti-war activists in a conspiracy which included academic and bookseller Frank Stearns Giese.
- June 13, 1974: The 29th floor of the Gulf Tower in Pittsburgh, Pennsylvania, was bombed with dynamite at 9:41 pm resulting in no injuries. The radical leftist group Weather Underground took credit, but no suspects have ever been identified.
- May 31, 1975 – 1978: George Jackson Brigade bombings
- January 26, 1980: The home and car of Nguyen Thanh Hoang, a Vietnamese anti-communist journalist, were firebombed in Arlington County, Virginia. No one was injured. Hoang had received letters urging him to stop his anti-communist propaganda. After the event, two letters which claimed responsibility for the bombings were signed by a group calling itself the 'Action Squad'.
- November 7, 1983: U.S. Senate bombing. The Armed Resistance Unit, a militant leftist group, bombed the United States Capitol in response to the U.S. invasion of Grenada.
- May and June 1984: Earl Steven Karr planted over 20 pipe-bombs all around Minnesota, Illinois and Wisconsin. He was arrested in Mason City, Iowa after a pipe-bomb he was transporting detonated in the trunk of his car. Karr suffered second degree burns in the explosion. Only one person is known to have been injured by his explosives. Karr, a man with mental problems who stated he was a "former homosexual", left notes near the bombs which named the "North Central Gay Strike Force Against Public and Police Oppression" as the responsible party. A motive could not be determined other than a dislike of the towns the bombs were placed in.
- May 19, 2012: Three men were arrested after a raid an apartment, seized pipe bomb instructions, an improvised mortar made of PVC piping, a crossbow, knives, shurikens, a map of Chicago and four fire bombs, authorities confirmed. On April 25, 2014, the three men were sentenced to eight to five years in prison, considerably reducing initial penalties of up to thirty years.
- June 14, 2017: Congressional baseball shooting. James T. Hodgkinson was distraught over the 2016 election of President Donald J. Trump, and opened fire on an Alexandria, Virginia, baseball field where the Republican congressional team was practicing for the following day's Congressional Baseball Game. Majority whip Representative Steve Scalise of Louisiana was one of four who were wounded. Hodgkinson was fatally shot by police who arrived at the scene within a few minutes of the shooting.
- July 4, 2025: Eleven people in Northern Texas coordinated an ambush on an ICE immigration facility in Alvarado. The attackers vandalized police vehicles in order to lure officers outside. After shooting one police officer in the neck, who also survived, the militants retreated. Multiple assault rifles, radios, and tactical vests were located near the facility. A manhunt immediately began for suspects. As of November 11, 2025, 18 people have been arrested in connection to the attack. Three days later a lone-wolf attack occurred at another immigration facility in Southern Texas, targeting CBP, where the attacker was killed and three more were injured.

=== Palestinian and anti-Israel militancy ===
- June 5, 1968: Sirhan Sirhan, a Palestinian with Jordanian citizenship, assassinated Democratic presidential nominee, Robert F. Kennedy, in the Ambassador Hotel in Los Angeles, California, because of Kennedy's strong support of Israel. Some scholars believe the assassination was one of the first major incidents of political violence in the United States stemming from the Arab–Israeli conflict in the Middle East.
- March 4, 1973: A failed terrorist attack by Palestinian group Black September, with car bombings in New York City while Israeli Prime Minister Golda Meir was visiting the city
- June 1, 1973: Yosef Alon, the Israeli Air Force attaché in Washington, D.C., was shot and killed outside his home in Chevy Chase, Maryland. Palestinian militant group Black September is suspected, though the case remains unsolved.
- February 26, 1993 World Trade Center bombing, (New York City): Ramzi Yousef detonates a massive truck bomb under the World Trade Center, killing six people and injuring over 1,000 in an effort to collapse the towers.
- 1994 Brooklyn Bridge shooting: a van filled with Jewish schoolboys to avenge of Cave of the Patriarchs massacre.
- February 23, 1997: A Palestinian teacher, Ali Hassan Abu Kamal traveled to the top of the Empire State building where he shot seven people before killing himself.
- January 5, 2002: Charlie J. Bishop stole a Cessna 172, and crashed into the Bank of America Tower in downtown Tampa, Florida. Bishop was the sole fatality and no one else was injured. Bishop wrote a letter, saying that he was inspired by Osama bin Laden and 9/11 and praised the attacks as a "justified response to actions against Palestinians and Iraqis", and was acting on behalf of Al-Qaeda
- July 4, 2002: Los Angeles International Airport shooting: Two people were killed and four others injured by a terrorist who opened fire at the El Al ticket counter.
- July 28, 2006: Seattle Jewish Federation shooting, (Seattle, WA): An "angry" Pakistani-American who converted to Christianity uses a young girl as a hostage in an attempt to enter a local Jewish center, where he shoots six women, one of whom dies.

=== Puerto Rican nationalism ===
- March 1, 1954: United States Capitol shooting incident. Four Puerto Rican nationalists shoot and wound five members of the United States Congress during an immigration debate.
- October 14, 1969: The Fuerzas Armadas de Liberación Nacional (FALN), a Puerto Rican nationalist group, claims responsibility for a small bomb explosion at Macy's Herald Square
- January 24, 1975: FALN bombs Fraunces Tavern in New York City, killing four and injuring more than 50.
- December 29, 1975: A bomb set off by FALN in East Harlem, New York, permanently disables a police officer while causing him to lose an eye.
- August 3, 1977: FALN bombs exploded on the twenty-first floor of 342 Madison Avenue in New York City, which housed United States Department of Defense security personnel, as well as the Mobil Building at 150 East Forty-Second Street, killing one. In addition the group warned that bombs were located in thirteen other buildings, including the Empire State Building and the World Trade Center resulting in the evacuation of one hundred thousand people. Five days later a bomb attributed to the group was found in the AMEX building.
- May 3, 1979: FALN exploded a bomb outside of the Shubert Theatre in Chicago, injuring five people.
- March 15, 1980: Armed members of FALN raided the campaign headquarters of President Jimmy Carter in Chicago and the campaign headquarters of George H. W. Bush in New York City. Seven people in Chicago and ten people in New York were tied up as the offices were vandalized before the FALN members fled. A few days later, Carter delegates in Chicago received threatening letters from FALN.
- May 16, 1981: One was killed in an explosion in the toilets at the Pan Am terminal at New York's JFK airport. The bombing is claimed by the Puerto Rican Resistance Army.
- December 31, 1982: FALN explodes bombs outside of the 26 Federal Plaza in Manhattan, Federal Bureau of Investigation Headquarters and a United States courthouse in Brooklyn. Three New York Police Department police officers are blinded with one officer losing both eyes. All three officers sustained other serious injuries trying to defuse a second Federal Plaza bomb.

=== Right-wing and anti-government extremism ===
Although President Donald Trump said in September 2025 that "the radicals on the left are the problem" with political violence, cumulatively over decades most extremist killings in the U.S. have been caused by right-wing perpetrators. From 2022 through 2024, all 61 political killings were committed by right-wing extremists.

Over decades, right-wing ideologically motivated homicides have substantially outnumbered those perpetrated by left-wing perpetrators in the U.S. Far-right motivated homicides have also occurred much more frequently than jihadi violence inspired by Islamic extremism (not shown in chart).

- August 21, 1863: Lawrence Massacre: The Confederate guerrilla group Quantrill's Raiders led by William Quantrill raided and committed a massacre on the Unionist town of Lawrence, Kansas due to the town's long support of abolition, killing about 190 civilians.
- December 7, 1863: Chesapeake affair: Pro-Confederate British subjects from the Maritime Provinces hijacked the American steamer Chesapeake off the coast of Cape Cod, Massachusetts, killing a crew member and wounding three others in the ensuing gunfight. The intent of this hijacking was to use the ship as a blockade runner for the Confederacy under the belief that they had an official Confederate letter of marque.
- October 19, 1864: St. Albans Raid: Confederate soldiers without proper uniform raided the border town of St. Albans, Vermont from the Province of Canada, robbing $208,000 from three banks, holding hostages, killing a civilian and wounding two others, and attempting to burn the entire town with Greek fire.
- April 19, 1995: Oklahoma City bombing: A truck bomb destroyed the Alfred P. Murrah Federal Building in downtown Oklahoma City, killing 168 people. Far-right terrorists Timothy McVeigh and Terry Nichols were convicted in the bombing; McVeigh was executed by lethal injection in 2001.
- July 27, 1996: Centennial Olympic Park bombing by Eric Robert Rudolph occurred in Atlanta, Georgia, during the Atlanta Olympics. One person was killed and 111 injured. In a statement released in 2005 Rudolph said the motive was to protest abortion and the "global socialist" Olympic Movement.
- July 27, 2008: Knoxville Unitarian Universalist church shooting: Jim David Adkisson enters the Tennessee Valley Unitarian Universalist Church in Knoxville, Tennessee with a shotgun, killing two and injuring several congregants before being tackled to the ground. Adkisson stated to the police and in a manifesto that he desired to kill Democrats, liberals, African Americans and homosexuals. Adkisson pleaded guilty to the crime in February 2009 and was sentenced to life in prison without the possibility of parole.
- November 1, 2013: 2013 Los Angeles International Airport shooting: 23-year-old Paul Ciancia kills a Transportation Security Administration agent and wounds 7 others, 3 of them TSA agents. Ciancia was shot and taken into custody. A note found in Ciancia's pocket said he believed he was a "patriot" upset at former Homeland Security Secretary Janet Napolitano, and that he wanted to kill "TSA and pigs".
- March 14, 2014: Robert James Talbot Jr, from Katy, Texas was arrested, after a nearly eight-month operation by the FBI, Secret Service, Houston Police and Harris Sheriff's Office, investigated after creating a Facebook page called "American Insurgent Movement", with the aim of recruiting five of six persons for tried to theft of a stock car and banks, and start a ring of attacks against government buildings and law enforcements in the Greater Houston zone.
- June 8, 2014: 2014 Las Vegas shootings: Two Las Vegas police officers while eating pizza in a restaurant and one civilian were shot to death by Jerad and Amanda Miller, a married couple, in a suicide attack. A Gadsden flag, swastika and a note promising "revolution," was placed on the deceased officers bodies. The couple were thrown out of a patriot group defending rancher Cliven Bundy. The Millers were both killed in a shootout with police on the same day.
- October 22 – November 1, 2018: October 2018 United States mail bombing attempts: At least twelve confirmed packages containing pipe bombs were mailed within the U.S. Postal Service system to several prominent critics of U.S. President Donald Trump, including various Democratic Party politicians (Hillary Clinton, Barack Obama, Joe Biden, Eric Holder, Debbie Wasserman Schultz, Maxine Waters, Cory Booker), actor Robert De Niro, billionaire investor George Soros, former CIA Director John O. Brennan, and former Director of National Intelligence James Clapper. On October 26, a 56-year-old man named Cesar Altieri Sayoc Jr. was arrested by authorities in Plantation, Florida in connection with the explosive devices. The suspect has a criminal history. A white van covered in stickers (several showing support for Donald Trump) was also seized by authorities.
- January 6, 2021: January 6 United States Capitol attack. A mob of right-wing extremists stormed and subsequently attempted a coup d'état to prevent the counting of electoral college votes following Donald Trump's loss in the 2020 United States presidential election. The belligerents, which include a myriad of far-right organizations such as QAnon, Proud Boys, Oath Keepers, among many others, were following a seven-part plan proposed by Trump so that he could remain in office, and overturn the election's results. The insurrection resulted in the death of 2 people and 174 injured, with the injured mainly police officers on peacekeeping duties. Four officers committed suicide in the weeks following the incident. Over 1,200 people have been charged in connection to the attack, making it one of the largest criminal trials in United States history.

=== White nationalism and white supremacy ===
- June 1, 1921: The Tulsa race massacre, the destruction of the city's prosperous African-American community by white supremacists. The European-American authorities tolerated and frequently participated in the destruction of the Greenwood District, the wealthy area of Black-owned businesses which was known as "Black Wall Street". Airplanes were reported to have dropped incendiary devices on the city, contributing to a firestorm.
- 1951: Wave of hate related terrorist attacks in Florida. Black people were dragged and beaten to death, and there were 11 racist bombings. Synagogues and a Jewish School were dynamited in Miami. Explosives were found outside Catholic churches in Miami.
- 1963: The 16th Street Baptist Church bombing was a terrorist bombing of the 16th Street Baptist Church in Birmingham, Alabama on September 15, 1963. The bombing was committed by members of the Ku Klux Klan, a white supremacist terrorist group.
- 1988: Frazier Glenn Miller Jr. a Vietnam War veteran and the founder of the Carolina Knights of the Ku Klux Klan/White Patriot Party in the early 1980s served three years in Federal penitentiary for trying to assassinate Morris Dees, founder of the Southern Poverty Law Center. The FBI found a cache of weapons in his home after they used tear gas to drive him out and arrest him. He testified against 14 White Supremacists as part of a plea bargain deal.
- January 17, 2011: 2011 Spokane bombing attempt: Kevin William Harpham attempted to bomb a Martin Luther King Day parade in Spokane, Washington but failed.
- August 5, 2012: Wisconsin Sikh temple shooting: Wade Michael Page killed six people at a Sikh temple in Oak Creek, Wisconsin before killing himself after being wounded by police officers. During the investigation of the crime, police found out that Page was a member of white supremacist and neo-Nazi organizations such as the Hammerskin Nation/Hammerskins. The police concluded that racism and ethnic hatred was the main cause of the murders.
- April 13, 2014: Overland Park Jewish Community Center shooting: Klansman and Neo-Nazi Frazier Glenn Miller killed three people at Jewish community centers in Overland Park, Kansas.
- June 17, 2015: Charleston church shooting: Dylann Roof carried out a mass shooting at Emanuel African Methodist Episcopal Church in downtown Charleston, South Carolina. The church is one of the United States' oldest black churches and has long been a site for community organization around civil rights. Nine people were killed, including the senior pastor, Clementa C. Pinckney, a state senator. A tenth victim was also shot, but survived. The FBI has not officially classified the act as terrorism, which was met with controversy.
- March 20, 2017: Murder of Timothy Caughman: James Harris Jackson, a 28-year-old War in Afghanistan veteran, traveled to New York City from his hometown of Baltimore with the intention of killing black men there. Three days after arriving at New York City, Jackson stabbed Caughman, a black man, to death with an 18-inch sword. He then turned himself in to authorities. Jackson was charged with one count each of murder in the first and second degrees as an act of terrorism, second-degree murder as a hate crime, and three counts of criminal possession of a weapon.
- August 12, 2017: 2017 Charlottesville attack: James Alex Fields of the neo-Nazi group Vanguard America (VA) drove into the front of a crowd of marchers on the street, who witnesses say were counter-protesting the "Unite the Right" rally which began the night before. One person died and 35 were injured.
- August 3, 2019: 2019 El Paso shooting: Patrick Crusius committed a violent domestic terrorist attack/mass shooting targeting Latinos at a Walmart store in El Paso, Texas, killing 23 people and injuring 22 others.
- May 14, 2022: 2022 Buffalo shooting: Payton S. Gendron committed a mass shooting targeting African Americans at a Tops Friendly Markets supermarket in Buffalo, New York, killing 10 people and injuring 3 others. Eleven of the 13 victims shot were Black while two others were White.

==== Organized KKK violence ====
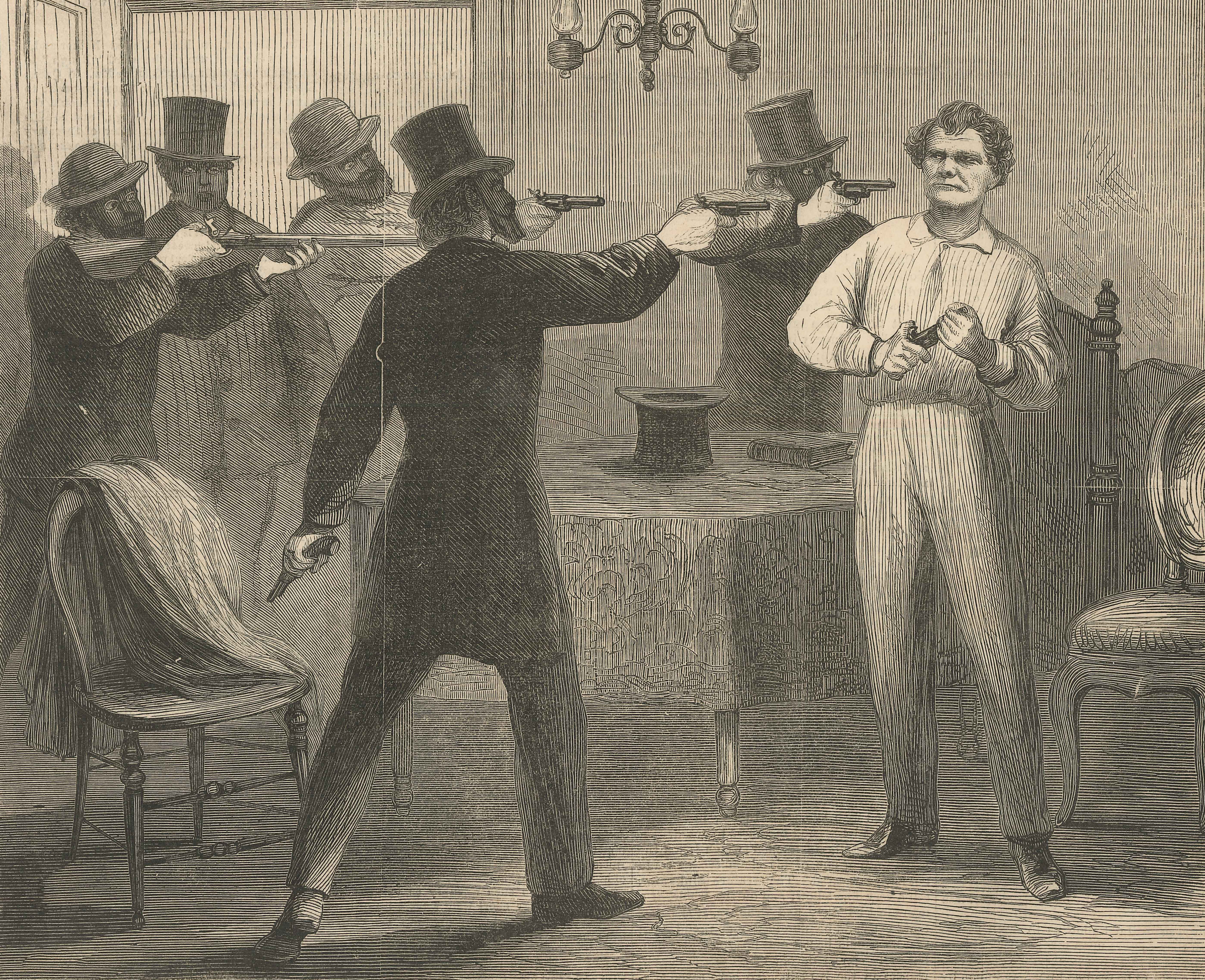
George W. Ashburn assassinated for his pro-black sentiments.

Date	Type	Dead	Injured	Location	Details
1865–1877	Campaign of violence	3,000+		Southern United States	Over 3,000 Freedmen and their Republican Party allies were killed by a combination of the Ku Klux Klan and well-organized campaigns of violence by local whites in a campaign of terrorist violence that overthrew Reconstructionist governments in the south and established segregationist regimes that lasted until the mid-20th century.
October 22, 1868	Assassination	1	0	Little Rock, Arkansas	James M. Hinds, Arkansas congressional representative, was assassinated by a member of the Ku Klux Klan in Little Rock.
November 10, 1898	Riot	22+		Wilmington, North Carolina	In the Wilmington massacre of 1898, white supremacists overthrew the biracial Republican government of Wilmington, North Carolina, killing at least 22 African Americans, and marking the beginning of the Jim Crow era in North Carolina.
December 25, 1951	Bombing, assassination	2	0	Mims, Florida	Harry T. Moore, state co-coordinator of the Florida NAACP, and his wife were killed by a dynamite bomb in his Mims, Florida home. Despite an extensive FBI investigation, no one was arrested, but the Orlando KKK was suspected.
June 12, 1963	Shooting, assassination	1	0	Jackson, Mississippi	NAACP organizer Medgar Evers was killed in front of his Mississippi home by member of the Ku Klux Klan.
September 15, 1963	Bombing	4	22	Birmingham, Alabama	16th Street Baptist Church bombing: A member of the Ku Klux Klan bombed a church in Birmingham, Alabama, killing four girls.
June 21, 1964	Kidnapping and murder	3	0	Philadelphia, Mississippi	The murders of Chaney, Goodman, and Schwerner, three civil rights workers, in Philadelphia, Mississippi by the Ku Klux Klan.
March 25, 1965	Shooting	1	0	Selma, Alabama	The Ku Klux Klan murdered Viola Liuzzo, a Southern-raised white mother of five who was visiting Alabama from her home in Detroit to attend a civil rights march. At the time of her murder, Liuzzo was transporting civil rights marchers.
January 10, 1966	Firebombing	1	0	Hattiesburg, Mississippi	Vernon Dahmer died in the firebombing of his home in Mississippi at the hands of the Ku Klux Klan.
November 3, 1979	Shooting	5	5	Greensboro, North Carolina	Greensboro massacre: Members of the Ku Klux Klan and the American Nazi Party jumped out of vehicles and fired on an anti-Klan demonstration. The demonstration was led by members of a Communist group who were trying to organize local African American workers in Greensboro, North Carolina. Five demonstration participants were killed.
March 20, 1981	Lynching	1	0	Mobile, Alabama	Michael Donald was randomly selected to be lynched by two Ku Klux Klan members near his Alabama home. He was beaten, had his throat slit, and was hanged.

== Deadliest attacks ==
The following is a list of the deadliest known single-day terrorist attacks in the United States to date. Only incidents with ten or more deaths, excluding those of the perpetrators, are included.

The W column gives a basic description of the weapons used:

F – Firearms and other ranged weapons. This primarily includes rifles and handguns, but also bows and crossbows, grenade launchers, flamethrowers, or slingshots.
M – Melee weapons, like knives, swords, spears, machetes, axes, clubs, rods, rocks, or bare hands.
O – Any other weapons, such as aircraft hijackings, poison and poisonous gas.
A – indicates that arson was used
V – indicates that a vehicle ramming attack occurred
E – indicates that explosives were used

† Was previously the deadliest terrorist attack.

Rank	Date	Fatalities	Injuries	Article	W	Location(s)
1	September 11, 2001	2,977 (plus 19 perpetrators)	≈ 6,000–25,000	September 11 attacks	O	New York City, New York; Arlington, Virginia; Shanksville, Pennsylvania
2	April 19, 1995 †	168–169	680+	Oklahoma City bombing	E	Oklahoma City, Oklahoma
3	September 7–11, 1857 †	120+	17+	Mountain Meadows Massacre	M, F	Mountain Meadows, Utah Territory
4	June 12, 2016	49 (plus the perp.)	58 (53 from gunfire)	Pulse nightclub shooting	F	Orlando, Florida
5	May 18, 1927	44 (plus the perp.)	58	Bath School disaster	E	Bath Charter Township, Michigan
6	May 31-June 1, 1921	39 (150-300 estimate)	800+	Tulsa race massacre	F, E, A	Greenwood, Tulsa, Oklahoma
7	September 16, 1920	38	143	Wall Street bombing	E	New York City, New York
8	August 3, 2019	23 (Note: including a victim who died due to complications in 2020)	22	El Paso Walmart shooting	F	El Paso, Texas
9	November 10, 1898	22+	unknown	Wilmington massacre	A, F	Wilmington, North Carolina
10	October 1, 1910	21	100+	Los Angeles Times bombing	E	Los Angeles, California
11	January 1, 2025	14 (plus the perp.)	57	New Orleans truck attack	V, F, E	New Orleans, Louisiana
11	November 5, 2009	14 (Note: The fatality total includes an unborn child.)	32 (plus the perp.)	Fort Hood shooting	F	Fort Cavazos, Texas (formerly Fort Hood)
11	December 2, 2015	14 (plus both perpetrators)	24	San Bernardino attack	F, E	San Bernardino, California
14	May 4, 1886	12 (Note: including a victim who died due to complications two years later)	130+	Haymarket affair	E	Chicago, Illinois
15	December 29, 1975	11	74	LaGuardia Airport bombing	E	New York City, New York
15	October 27, 2018	11	6 (plus the perp.)	Pittsburgh synagogue shooting	F	Pittsburgh, Pennsylvania
17	July 22, 1916	10	40	Preparedness Day Bombing	E	San Francisco, California
17	November 24, 1917	10	6	Milwaukee Police Department bombing	E	Milwaukee, Wisconsin
17	May 14, 2022	10	3	Buffalo supermarket shooting	F	Buffalo, New York

== Failed attacks ==
=== 19th century ===
- November 25, 1864: Confederate Army of Manhattan Fires were set at 19 New York City hotels, P.T. Barnum's Museum, and 2 hay barges resulting in minor damage. Plot to burn down New York City organized by Confederate Lieutenant Colonel Robert Martin failed because the Greek fire incendiary devices were defective and the Lincoln Administration had been tipped off by a double agent and intercepted telegraph messages. After the conspirators found out the plot had been discovered they escaped to Canada. Confederate Captain Robert C. Kennedy became the only conspirator apprehended when he was arrested following his return to the U.S. Kennedy was tried by a military tribunal and hanged.

=== 20th century ===
- June 1940: Two dynamite bombs were discovered outside of the Philadelphia Convention Hall during the Republican National Convention. A total of seven bombs were discovered in the greater Philadelphia area during this period.
- November 1, 1950: Attempted assassination of Harry S. Truman by members of the Puerto Rican Nationalist Party at the Blair House in Washington, D.C.
- 1965 The Monumental Plot – New York Police thwart an attempt to dynamite the Statue of Liberty, Liberty Bell, and the Washington Monument by three members of the pro-Castro Black Liberation Front and a Quebec Separatist.
- March 6, 1970: Three members of the Weather Underground were killed when their "bomb factory" located in New York's Greenwich Village accidentally exploded. WUO members Theodore Gold, Diana Oughton, and Terry Robbins died in this accident. The bomb was intended to be planted at a non-commissioned officer's dance at Fort Dix, New Jersey. The bomb was packed with nails to inflict maximum casualties upon detonation. See Greenwich Village townhouse explosion.
- April 1971: Pipe bombs found at the embassies of Vietnam, Cambodia and Laos in Washington, D.C.
- 1972: Two Jewish Defense League members were arrested and charged with bomb possession and burglary in a conspiracy to blow up the Long Island residence of the Soviet mission to the United Nations.
- March 6, 1973: 1973 New York bomb plot Explosives found in the trunks of cars were defused at the El Al air terminal at Kennedy Airport, the First Israel Bank and Trust Company, and the Israel Discount Bank, in New York City. The plot was foiled when the National Security Agency intercepted an encrypted message sent to the Iraqi foreign ministry in Baghdad to the Palestine Liberation Organization's office. The attacks were meant to coincide with visit of Israeli Prime Minister Golda Meir. Khalid Duhham al-Jawary of the Black September was convicted on charges relating to the attacks in 1993 and was released to immigration authorities in 2009.
- September 22, 1975: Sarah Jane Moore tries to assassinate President Gerald Ford outside of the St. Francis Hotel in San Francisco. The attempt fails when a bystander grabs her arm and deflects the shot. Moore has stated the motive was to create chaos to bring "the winds of change" because the government had declared war on the left wing.
- 1984: According to Oregon law enforcement there was an abortive plot by the Rajneeshee cult to murder United States Attorney for Oregon, Charles Turner.
- April 1985: The FBI arrested several members of a Sikh terrorist group who were plotting to kill Indian PM Rajiv Gandhi when he visited New York in June.
- April 12, 1988: Yū Kikumura, a member of the Japanese Red Army, is arrested with three pipe bombs on the New Jersey Turnpike. According to prosecutors, Kikumura planned to bomb a military recruitment office in the Veteran's Administration building in lower Manhattan on April 14, the anniversary of the U.S. raid on Libya.
- February 26, 1993: 1993 World Trade Center bombing: Ramzi Yousef, a member of Al Qaeda, masterminds the truck-bombing of the World Trade Center. The bomb is meant to destabilize the foundation of the building, causing it to collapse and destroy surrounding buildings, leading to mass casualties. It failed to do so, but the detonation killed 6 people and injured more than 1000.
- June 1993: New York City landmark bomb plot. Followers of radical cleric Omar Abdel-Rahman were arrested while planning to bomb landmarks in New York City, including the UN headquarters.
- August 1994: Two far-right extremists, Douglas Baker & Leroy Wheeler, both members of the Minnesota Patriots Council, are arrested for making ricin, a deadly toxin. The two will later be convicted of attempting to poison federal agents.
- March 1995: Charles Ray Polk is arrested while attempting to buy plastic explosives and machine guns in order to assassinate four police officers and a female judge, and to bomb the IRS offices in Tyler, Texas.
- November 9, 1995: Willie Ray Lampley, a self-proclaimed Prophet, along with his wife Cecilia and a family friend John Dare Baird, were arrested for a plot to bomb numerous targets, including the Southern Poverty Law Center in Montgomery, Alabama, the Anti-Defamation League offices in Dallas and Houston, Texas, as well as a number of gay bars & abortion clinics.
- December 1995: Tax protesters Joseph Martin Bailie and Ellis Edward Hurst attempt to blow up the Internal Revenue Service building in Reno, Nevada with a 100-pound ANFO bomb.
- April 1996: Anti-government activist & survivalist Ray Hamblin is arrested after authorities find 460 pounds of the high explosive Tovex, 746 pounds of ANFO blasting agent, and 15 homemade hand grenades on his property in Hood River, Oregon during an investigation into a series of explosions in his storage sheds.
- July 1996: Twelve members of an Arizona militia group called the Viper Team are arrested on federal conspiracy, weapons and explosive charges after planning to bomb a number of Federal office buildings, including one that houses the office of the Bureau of Alcohol, Tobacco and Firearms and the FBI.
- July 1996: Washington State Militia leader John Pitner and seven others are arrested on weapons and explosives charges in connection with a plot to build pipe bombs for a confrontation with the federal government. Pitner and four others will be convicted on weapons charges, while conspiracy charges against all eight will end in a mistrial. Pitner will later be retried on that charge, convicted and sentenced to four years in prison.
- October 1996: Seven members of the Mountaineer Militia are arrested in a plot to blow up the FBI's national Criminal Justice Information Services Division in Clarksburg, West Virginia. In 1998, leader Floyd "Ray" Looker, will be sentenced to 18 years in prison.
- March 17, 1997: anti-abortion extremist Peter Howard puts 13 gas cans and three propane tanks in his truck, and drives it through the door of a California women's clinic in a failed attempt to fire bomb the clinic.
- September 1999: anti-abortion extremist Clayton Lee Waagner was pulled over by the Pennsylvania State Police, but fled into the woods and evaded capture, leaving behind a stolen car that contained firearms, explosives, fake ID, and a list of abortion clinics. Later in September 1999, while on a self-described "Mission from God", he took his wife and their nine children on a cross-country road trip headed west in a stolen Winnebago, planning to murder various abortion doctors, beginning with one in Seattle, Washington. However, after crossing into Illinois his vehicle broke down, and Waagner was arrested when Illinois State Police stopped to investigate. Waagner was convicted on charges of interstate transportation of a stolen motor vehicle and for being a convicted felon in possession of firearms. Waagner later escaped and used a cross country crime spree to continue to fund his anti-abortion mission.
- January 1, 2000: 2000 millennium attack plots, plan to bomb LAX Airport in Los Angeles

=== 21st century ===
- December 5, 2001: anti-abortion extremist Clayton Lee Waagner was arrested in a Kinko's while he was preparing to fax bomb threats to a mass list of abortion clinics.
- December 12, 2001: Jewish Defense League plot by Chairman Irv Rubin and follower Earl Krugel to blow up the King Fahd Mosque in Culver City, California and the office of Lebanese-American Congressman Darrell Issa foiled.
- December 22, 2001: British citizen and self-proclaimed Al Qaeda member Richard Reid attempted to detonate the C-4 explosive PETN concealed in his shoes while on a flight from Paris to Miami. He was subdued by crew and passengers with the plane landing safely in Boston.
- 2004 financial buildings plot: Al-Qaeda plan to bomb the International Monetary Fund, New York Stock Exchange, Citigroup and Prudential buildings broken up after arrest of computer expert in Pakistan and plotters in Britain.
- 2004 Columbus Shopping Mall bombing plot: A loosely organized group of young men planned to carry out an attack on an unnamed shopping mall.
- September 11, 2006: A man rammed his car into a women's clinic that he thought was an abortion clinic and set it ablaze in Davenport, Iowa causing $20,000 worth of damage to the building.
- April 25, 2007: A bomb was left in a women's clinic in Austin, Texas but failed to explode.
- 2009: 2009 New York bomb plot
- December 25, 2009: British and Nigerian citizen and self-described Al-Qaeda member Umar Farouk Abdulmutallab allegedly attempted to blow up Northwest Airlines Flight 253 in flight over Detroit by igniting his underpants which were filled with the C-4 explosive PETN. He has been indicted in a U.S. federal court; charges include the attempted murder of 289 people. Several days later, Al Qaeda's affiliate in Yemen and Saudi Arabia claimed responsibility for the attempted attack. Addressing America, the group threatened to "come for you to slaughter." On January 24, 2010, an audio tape that US intelligence believes is authentic was broadcast in which Osama bin Laden claimed responsibility for the attempted bombing. The intelligence officials expressed doubt about the veracity of bin Laden's claim. On October 12, 2011, Abdulmutallab pled guilty to all counts against him and read a statement to the court saying "I attempted to use an explosive device which in the U.S. law is a weapon of mass destruction, which I call a blessed weapon to save the lives of innocent Muslims, for U.S. use of weapons of mass destruction on Muslim populations in Afghanistan, Iraq, Yemen and beyond".
- May 1, 2010 2010 Times Square car bomb attempt and plot: An attempted evening car bombing in crowded Times Square in New York City failed when a street vendor saw smoke emanating from an SUV and called police. The White House has blamed Tehrik-e-Taliban the Pakistani Taliban for the failed attack and said Faisal Shahzad aged 30, an American of Pakistani origin who has been arrested in relation to the incident was working for the group. In July 2010, the Pakistani Taliban released a video featuring Shahzad in which he urged other Muslims in the West to follow his example and to wage similar attacks. On May 3, Shahzad was arrested at Kennedy Airport as he was preparing to fly to Dubai. The device was described as crude and amateurish but potent enough to cause casualties. On May 13 the F.B.I. raided several locations in the Northeast and arrested 3 on alleged immigration violations. Several suspects were arrested in Pakistan including the co-owner of a prominent catering firm used by the US embassy. On June 21 Shahzad pled guilty to 10 counts saying he created the bomb to force the US military to withdraw troops and stop drone attacks in a number of Muslim countries. Shahzad said he chose the location to cause mass civilian casualties because the civilians elected the government that carried out the allegedly anti Muslim policies. On October 4, 2010, Shahzad was sentenced to life in prison. During his sentencing, he threatened that "the defeat of the U.S. is imminent" and that "we will keep on terrorizing you until you leave our lands." Shahzad planned on detonating a second bomb in Times Square two weeks later.
- July 21, 2010: Bryon Williams captured after shootout with California Highway Patrol with guns strapped on his body armor alleged to have confessed that he was on his way to kill workers at the American Civil Liberties Union and follow it up with and attack on Tides Center allegedly was angry with left-wing politics and inspired by conspiracy theories of Glenn Beck and hoped the attack would ignite a revolution.
- January 17, 2011: Spokane bombing attempt: A small pipe bomb in a backpack designed to be detonated by remote control and spread shrapnel in a specific direction was discovered during a Martin Luther King Day parade in Spokane, Washington. White supremacist Kevin Harpham was convicted and sentenced to 32 years in federal prison.
- April 8, 2013: Letters believed to contain the poison Ricin were sent to President Barack Obama and Mississippi Republican Senator Roger Wicker and a Mississippi Justice official. Tests on the granular substance found in the letters tested positive for "low grade" ricin.
- April 25, 2013: Dzhokhar Tsarnaev, the suspect in the Boston Marathon bombing, told investigators that he and his brother discussed using leftover explosives to attack Times Square. According to NYC Police commissioner Raymond Kelly the plan was conceived after they attacked Boston and was foiled when their SUV ran out of gas as they tried to escape from the Boston marathon bombing manhunt.
- January 15, 2015: Washington, DC. A 20-year-old Ohio man was arrested by the FBI for wanting to set off pipe bombs at the U.S. Capitol as a way of supporting ISIS. Federal authorities identified the man as Christopher Lee Cornell, also known as Raheel Mahrus Ubaydah. Cornell, who lived in the Cincinnati area, allegedly told an FBI informant they should "wage jihad," and showed his plans for bombing the Capitol and shooting people, according to a criminal complaint filed in federal court. The FBI said Cornell expressed his desire to support the Islamic State. Authorities say Cornell was arrested Wednesday after buying two semi-automatic rifles and about 600 rounds of ammunition, but an FBI agent says the public was never in danger.
- May 3, 2015: Garland, Texas. Elton Simpson and Nadir Soofi, roommates from North Phoenix, Arizona, were killed by a security guard when they started shooting at a building holding a Mohammad cartoon contest sponsored by Stop Islamization of America. A school security officer helping with security at the event was shot in the leg.
- October 14, 2016: Three men were arrested in Garden City, Kansas, for plotting a car bomb attack against an apartment complex where Somali and Muslim migrants live. The three attackers were part of a group called "The Crusaders".
- October 22–26, 2018: At least twelve packages containing pipe bombs were mailed within the U.S. Postal Service system to several prominent critics of U.S. President Donald Trump, including various Democratic Party politicians (Hillary Clinton, Barack Obama, Joe Biden, Eric Holder, Debbie Wasserman Schultz, Maxine Waters, Cory Booker), actor Robert De Niro, billionaire investor George Soros, former CIA Director John O. Brennan, and former Director of National Intelligence James Clapper.
- October 8, 2020: The FBI announced the arrests of 13 people for attempting to kidnap Michigan Governor Gretchen Whitmer and overthrow the state government.
- May 22, 2023: A Missouri man allegedly attempted to crash a U-Haul truck into the White House, but instead hit a nearby security barrier. Sai Varshith Kandula, 19, who had a Nazi flag with him and made verbal threats against President Biden and Vice President Harris, was arrested. He told police he wanted to "seize power" and kill the president, and that he admired Nazi authoritarianism and eugenics. Conspiracy theorists on Twitter began labeling the attack a false flag, in part due to Kandula's ethnicity, which reportedly is Telugu. Kandula is not a U.S. citizen but he does have a green card; if convicted, he will likely be deported.
- September 4, 2024: A 21 year old Pakistani, Muhammad Shahzeb Khan, also known as Shazeb Jadoon, was arrested in Ormstown (a Canadian municipality place near the border with the US), on suspicion of plotting attacks against Jewish people in the USA on the anniversary of the 7 October attacks on behalf of the Islamic State. Khan has a Canadian student visa. was extradited to the United States, where he pleaded guilty in U.S. District Court for the Southern District of New York to attempting to provide material support to the Islamic State group and to attempting to carry out a terrorist attack in support of ISIS. Assistant Attorney General for National Security said Khan planned a mass shooting to “with the explicit goal of killing as many Jews as possible.”

== Alleged and proven plots ==
=== 19th century ===
- November 1864: Plan by Confederate Lieutenant Colonel Robert Martin and the Copperheads organization Sons of Liberty to attack New York City and disrupt elections collapsed when the Sons of Liberty backed out upon seeing large numbers of Union troops.
- February 28, 1865 Dahlgren Affair: Alleged plot by Union General Judson Kilpatrick to burn down Richmond, Virginia and kill Confederate President Jefferson Davis and his Cabinet. Allegations based on papers recovered by a 13-year-old member of the Confederate home guard. The authenticity of the papers have been a matter of dispute.

=== 20th century ===
- January 1940: The FBI shut down the Christian Front after discovering that its members were arming themselves to "murder Jews, communists, and 'a dozen Congressmen'" and establish a government modeled after Nazi Germany.
- March 31, 1943: Clarence Cull was arrested and charged with attempting to assassinate President Franklin D. Roosevelt by suicide bombing. Cull blamed Roosevelt for lost convoys of merchant ships.
- November 9, 1995: Oklahoma Constitutional Militia members were arrested while planning to bomb the Southern Poverty Law Center, gay bars and abortion clinics.
- January 1, 1996: Members of the Viper Militia were arrested after being caught surveying government buildings in Arizona.
- July 13, 1996: John J. Ford, 47, of Bellport, Long Island, a former court officer and president of the Long Island U.F.O. Network, and Joseph Mazzachelli plotted to poison local politicians with radium and shoot them if that did not work. They believed the government was covering up knowledge of UFO landings.
- November 11, 1996: Seven members of the Mountaineer Militia were arrested over a plot to blow up the FBI fingerprint records center in West Virginia.
- July 4, 1997: Members of the splinter militia group the Third Continental Congress were arrested while planning attacks on military bases which they believed were being used to train United Nations troops to attack U.S. citizens.
- July 30, 1997: Two men planning to bomb the New York City subway the next day were arrested. A resident of their apartment informed police after he overheard the men discussing the plot.
- March 18, 1998: Members of the North American Militia were arrested over a plot to bomb Federal Buildings in Michigan, a television station and an interstate highway intersection.
- December 5, 1999: Members of the San Joaquin Militia were arrested on charges of plotting to bomb critical infrastructure locations in hopes of sparking an insurrection. The leaders of the group pled guilty to charges of plotting to kill a Federal judge.
- December 8, 1999: The leader of the Southeastern States Alliance militia group was arrested for a plot to bomb energy faculties with the goal of causing power outages in Florida and Georgia.

=== 2000s ===
- March 9, 2000: The former leader of the Texas Militia is arrested in a plot to attack the Federal Building in Houston.
- February 8, 2002: Two members of a group called Project 7 are arrested while plotting to kill judges and law enforcement officials in order to kick off a revolution.
- May 8, 2002: José Padilla, accused by John Ashcroft of plotting to attack the United States with a dirty bomb, declared as an enemy combatant, and denied habeas corpus. No material evidence has been produced to support the allegation.
- July 26, 2002: 2002 White supremacist terror plot: Two white supremacists were convicted of conspiring to start a race war by bombing landmarks associated with Jews and Blacks.
- September 3, 2002: An Idaho Mountain Militia Boys plot to kill a judge and a police officer and break a friend out of jail is uncovered.
- April 24, 2003: William Krar is charged for his part in the Tyler poison gas plot, a white supremacist related plan. A sodium cyanide bomb was seized with at least 100 other bombs, bomb components, machine guns, and 500,000 rounds of ammunition. He faces up to 10 years in prison.
- May 1, 2003: Iyman Faris pleads guilty to providing material support to al-Qaeda and plotting to bring down the Brooklyn Bridge by cutting through cables with blowtorches. He had been working as a double for the FBI since March, but in October was sentenced to 20 years in prison.
- August 31, 2005 2005 Los Angeles bomb plot: Kevin James, Hammad Samana, Gregory Patterson, and Levar Washington were indicted on charges to wage war against the U.S. government through terrorism in California. The men planned attacks against Jewish institutions and American military locations in Los Angeles during the Yom Kippur holiday.
- February 21, 2006: The Toledo terror plot where three men were accused of conspiring to wage a "holy war" against the United States, supply help to the terrorist in Iraq, and threatening to kill the US president.
- June 23, 2006: The Miami bomb plot to attack the Sears Tower where seven men were arrested after an FBI agent infiltrated a group while posing as an al-Qaeda member. No weapons or other materials were found. On May 12, 2009, after two mistrials due to hung juries five men were convicted and one acquitted on charges related to the plot. Narseal Batiste, the group's ringleader, was convicted on four charges, the only defendant to be convicted on all four charges brought against the defendants.
- July 7, 2006: Three suspects arrested in Lebanon for plotting to blow up a Hudson River tunnel and flood the New York financial district.
- November 29, 2006: Demetrius Van Crocker a white supremacist from rural Tennessee was sentenced to 30 years in prison for attempting to acquire Sarin nerve gas and C-4 explosives that he planned to use to destroy government buildings.
- December 8, 2006: Derrick Shareef, 22, a Muslim convert who talked about his desire to wage jihad against civilians was charged in a plot to set off four hand grenades in garbage cans December 22 at the Cherryvale Mall in Rockford, Illinois.
- March 5, 2007: A Rikers Island inmate offered to pay an undercover police officer posing as a hit man to behead New York City police commissioner Raymond Kelly and bomb police headquarters in retaliation for the controversial police shooting of Sean Bell. The suspect wanted the bombing to be considered a terrorist act.
- April 27, 2007: Six members of a self-styled Fort Payne area anti-immigration militia so-called Alabama Free Militia were arrested for planning an armed attack on Mexicans. Authorities seized nearby 130 grenades, a grenade launcher, 70 improvised explosive devices, uncovered booby traps, 120 marijuana plants and a pair of gun silencers.
- May 7, 2007: Fort Dix attack plot. Six men inspired by Jihadist videos arrested in a failed homegrown terrorism plot to kill soldiers. Plot unravels when Circuit City clerk becomes suspicious of the DVDs the men had created and report it to authorities who place an informant in the group. In October 2008 one man pleaded guilty to charges related to the plot. On December 22, 2008, five other men were convicted with conspiracy to kill American soldiers but were acquitted of attempted murder. Dritan, Shain and Eljvir Duka were sentenced to life in prison.
- June 3, 2007: John F. Kennedy International Airport terror plot. Four men indicted in plot to blow up jet-fuel supply tanks at JFK Airport and a 40-mile (64 km) connecting pipeline. One suspect is a U.S. citizen and one, Abdul Kadir, a former member of parliament in Guyana. The airport was targeted because one of the suspects saw arms shipments and missiles being shipped to Israel from that locale. In a recorded conversation one of the suspects allegedly told an informant that "Anytime you hit Kennedy, it is the most hurtful thing to the United States. To hit John F. Kennedy, wow.... They love JFK – he's like the man". Plot unraveled when a person from law enforcement was recruited. On June 29, 2010, Abdel Nur pled guilty to material support charges. Due to health reasons Kareem Ibrahim was removed from the case and will be tried separately. On August 2 Russell M. Defreitas and Abdul Kadir were convicted for their role in the plot.
- March 26, 2008: Michael S. Gorbey who was detained in January 2008 for carrying a loaded shotgun two blocks from the Capitol Building has been charged planning to set off a bomb after a device containing can of gunpowder duct-taped to a box of shotgun shells and a bottle containing buckshot or BB pellets was found in the pickup truck he was driving. The pickup truck was moved to a government parking lot where for a three-week period the device inside it went unnoticed. Michael Gorbey gets 22 years prison, but he insisted that police planted weapons.
- October 27, 2008: Federal agents claim to thwarted a plot by two white power skinheads to target an African American High School and kill 88 blacks and decapitate 14 more (the numbers 88 and 14 are symbolic to white supremacists) and although expecting to fail try to assassinate Barack Obama.
- May 20, 2009: 2009 New York City bomb plot Three U.S. citizens and one Haitian from Newburgh, New York were arrested in a plot to bomb a Riverdale Temple and a Riverdale Jewish Center in The Bronx, New York City in an alleged homegrown terrorist plot. It was also alleged that they planned to shoot down military planes operating out of Stewart Air National Guard Base also in Newburgh. One of the suspects whose parents are from Afghanistan was said to be "unhappy that many Muslim people were being killed in Afghanistan and Pakistan by the United States Military forces." On October 18, 2010, the four were convicted on most of the charges brought against them. On June 29, 2011, three of the men were sentenced to 25 years imprisonment by a judge who criticized the governments handling of the case. A 2014 award-winning HBO documentary about the four, The Newburgh Sting, claimed that it was a clear case of entrapment and an egregious miscarriage of justice.
- September: 2009 New York City Subway and United Kingdom plot: Najibullah Zazi of Denver was indicted on charges of trying to build and detonate a weapon of mass destruction by purchasing hydrogen peroxide, acetone and other chemicals. He and two others allegedly planned to detonate the homemade explosives on the New York City Subway system. On February 22, 2010, Zazi pled guilty to conspiracy to use weapons of mass destruction, conspiracy to commit murder in a foreign country and providing material support for a terrorist organization. Zazi said he was recruited by al-Qaeda as part of a "martyrdom plan". Zazi agreed to cooperate with authorities and has told them that the groups planned to walk into the Times Square and Grand Central stations with backpack bombs at rush hour and then choose which subway lines to attack. Several days later Adis Medunjanin and Zarein Ahmedzay high school classmates of Zazi were indicted and pled not guilty to charges of conspiracy to use weapons of mass destruction, conspiracy to commit murder in a foreign country and providing material support for a terrorist organization. On April 12 a fourth man was arrested in Pakistan. On April 23 Prosecutors said that two Senior Al Queda officials who were reportedly later killed in drone attacks ordered the attacks and Zarein Ahmedzay pleaded guilty to plot related charges. On July 7 five others were indicted including al-Qaeda leader Adnan Shukrijumah, and it was alleged the United Kingdom was also a target of the plot. While in Pakistan, Zazi, Ahmedzay and Medunjanin were allegedly recruited and directed by Shukrijumah, a former Florida student who is designated as one of the FBI's most wanted terrorists, to conduct a terrorist attack in the U.S. On August 6 new charges were brought against Medunjanin and 4 others including Shukrijumah. Medunjanin pleaded not guilty.
- August – September 2009: On September 24, William Boyd and Hysen Sherifi charged with "conducting reconnaissance of the Marine Corps base at Quantico, Virginia and obtaining armor-piercing ammunition with the intent to attack Americans". Boyd, two of his sons and several other suspects had been charged on international terrorism charges in August, but at the time there was no indication that they wanted to plot a United States attack. An audio tape of Boyd decrying the U.S. military, discussing the honor of martyrdom, and bemoaning the struggle of Muslims was played at an August hearing. It is the first case of a ring of homegrown terrorists having specific targets.
- September 24, 2009: Michael Finton/Talib Islam a 29-year-old man from Illinois charged with trying to kill federal employees by detonating a car bomb at the federal building in Springfield, Illinois. Charges based on F.B.I. sting operation. He is said to idolize American-born Taliban soldier John Walker Lindh.
- September 24, 2009: Hosam Maher Husein Smadi a 19-year-old illegal immigrant from Jordan charged with trying the bomb the 60 story Fountain Place office tower in Dallas, Texas. Charges are based on an FBI sting operation in which agents posed as members of an al-Qaeda sleeper cell.

=== 2010s ===
- January 7, 2010: Adis Medunjanin, an alleged 2009 New York City Subway plotter, attempts a suicide attack by intentionally crashing his car on the Whitestone Bridge in New York City. He is indicted for this on July 7. Medunjanin has since been charged for his role in an Al Qaeda plot to conduct coordinated suicide bombings on New York's subway system.
- May 2010: Paul Rockwood Jr. a meteorologist who took official weather observations and his pregnant wife Nancy from King Salmon, Alaska compiled a list of 20 targets, including members of the military and media and had moved to the operational phase of their plan pled guilty to lying to FBI about the list and making false statements to the FBI. Under a plea agreement Mr. Rockwood will serve eight years in prison and three years probation while Ms. Rockwood will serve probation. Motive was revenge for alleged descecration of Islam.
- September 20, 2010: Sami Samir Hassoun, 22, a Lebanese citizen living in Chicago, was charged with one count each of attempted use of a weapon of mass destruction and attempted use of an explosive device after placing a backpack with what he thought was a bomb near Wrigley Field. Alleged plot was foiled by FBI informant. Hassoun discussed other ideas for mass destruction attacks with informant.
- October 27, 2010: Farooque Ahmed, 34, a naturalized U.S. citizen indicted for conspiracy to bomb four Washington Metro stations with people he thought were al-Qaeda.
- November 26, 2010: Mohamed Osman Mohamud, a 19-year-old Somali-American, is alleged to have attempted a car bombing at a Christmas tree lighting ceremony in Portland, Oregon. The device was a dud created by the FBI. Motive is reported to be Jihad. On January 31, 2013, a jury found Mohamud guilty of the charge of trying to use a weapon of mass destruction.
- December 8, 2010: Antonio Martinez, also known as Muhammad Hussain, was arrested after a sting operation in an alleged plot to bomb a military recruiting center in Catonsville, Maryland. The 21-year-old suspect is an American who converted to Islam. The suspect was reported to be upset that the military continues to kill Muslims.
- December 21, 2010: Internet radio broadcaster Hal Turner sentenced to 33 months in prison after he published the work addresses and photographs of three judges who had upheld gun control laws and advocated for their assassination.
- February 24, 2011: Khalid Ali-M Aldawsari, a 20-year-old Saudi Arabian student, was arrested for building bombs to use in alleged terrorist attacks. Targets allegedly were the home of George W. Bush, hydroelectric dams, nuclear power plants, nightclubs and the homes of soldiers who were formerly stationed at the Abu Ghraib prison. In Aldawsari's journal he wrote he was inspired by the speeches of Osama bin Laden. Alleged plot uncovered when a supplier noticed suspicious purchases.
- May 11, 2011: In the 2011 Manhattan terrorism plot, Ahmed Ferhani, a resident of Queens, New York and native of Algeria, and Mohamed Mamdouh, aged 20, also from Queens and a Moroccan native, were arrested in a Lone Wolf plot against a New York Synagogue that had yet to be chosen. It also alleged that they hoped to attack the Empire State Building. The pair were arrested after buying two Browning semi-automatic pistols, one Smith & Wesson revolver, ammunition and one grenade. The pair disguised themselves as Jewish temple goers and pretended to pray. The suspects were said to be "committed to violent jihad".
- June 23, 2011: Abu Khalid Abdul-Latif and Walli Mujahidh of Long Beach, California are arrested on charges of buying machine guns and grenades and conspiring to attack a federal building housing a Military Entrance Processing Station in Seattle, Washington. The plot was uncovered by an informant. His motive was to send a message in protest of US action abroad. On April 8, 2013, Walli Mujahidh apologized and was sentenced to 17 years for his role in the plot.
- July 27, 2011: AWOL U.S. Army Private, and conscientious objector, Naser Jason Abdo from Garland, Texas was arrested in an alleged plot against Fort Hood, Texas. Materials for up to two bombs were found with jihadist materials in Abdo's motel room. An investigation began when the owner of a local gun store called police after becoming suspicious when Abdo asked questions indicating he did not know about the items he was purchasing.
- September 28, 2011: Rezwan Ferdaus, a US citizen, was indicted for allegedly plotting to use remote-controlled aircraft carrying explosives to bomb the Pentagon and the US Capitol. He also allegedly planned to hire people to shoot at people fleeing the Pentagon. Ferdaus was said to be motivated by Al Queada videos and the alleged plot was uncovered by an FBI sting operation. In July 2012 he pleaded guilty to plotting an attack on the Pentagon and U.S. Capitol and attempting to provide material support to terrorists. Under a plea bargain, he was sentenced to 17 years in prison and then 10 years of supervised release.
- October 11, 2011: Operation Red Coalition. Alleged plot that was "conceived, sponsored and was directed from Iran" to assassinate the Saudi Arabian ambassador to the United States, Adel al-Jubeir, with a bomb and bomb the Saudi and Israeli embassies in Washington, D.C. It is not known if Iranian Supreme Leader Ayatollah Ali Khamenei or President Mahmoud Ahmadinejad had knowledge of the plot. The alleged plot was disrupted by an FBI and DEA investigation. The investigation began in May 2011 when an Iranian-American approached a DEA informant seeking the help of a Mexican drug cartel to assassinate the Saudi ambassador. Iran has denied the allegations.
- October–November 2011: Georgia terrorist plot. Four elderly men from a Georgia militia arrested for plotting to buy ricin in preparation for an attack they claimed would "save the Constitution". They allegedly discussed blowing up IRS and ATF buildings, dispensing ricin from a plane over Atlanta and other cities, and assassinating "un-American" politicians. Informant used to break up alleged plot.
- November 20, 2011: Jose Pimentel, aged 27, an American citizen and a convert to Islam from New York City, is arrested and accused of being in the process of building pipe bombs (and one hour away from building his first bomb) to target Post Offices, police cars and U.S. military personnel returning from abroad in New York City and Bayonne, New Jersey. He was said to be a follower of the late al-Qaeda leader Anwar al-Awlaki. The FBI did not consider Pimentel, who was said to be radicalized via the internet, enough of a threat to investigate, but NYC police considered him a 2 on a threat scale of 1 to 5.
- January 7, 2012: Sami Osmakac, a naturalized American from Kosovo, was arrested in a plot to create mayhem in Tampa, Florida by car bombing, hostage taking and exploding a suicide belt. Alleged bomb targets included nightclubs in Ybor City, a bar, the operations center of the sheriff's office and South Tampa businesses. Osmakac allegedly told an FBI undercover agent "We all have to die, so why not die the Islamic way?". Osmakac pled not guilty on February 8.
- February 17, 2012: Amine El Khalifi a Moroccan man from Alexandria, Virginia was arrested in an alleged suicide bombing plot of the U.S. Capitol. He was arrested as a result of an FBI sting operation. As a result of a plea agreement El Khalifi was sentenced to 30 years in prison on September 14.
- May 1, 2012: Five self-described anarchists were arrested in an alleged plot to blow up a bridge in Cuyahoga Valley National Park in Brecksville, Ohio. The group was being monitored as part of an FBI undercover operation and had considered other plots previously. One of the suspects expressed a desire to cause financial damage to companies while avoiding casualties.
- August 27, 2012: Four non-commissioned officers from Fort Stewart in Georgia, along with five other men, were charged in an alleged plot to poison an apple orchard and blow up a dam in Washington State, seize control of Fort Stewart, set off explosives in a park in Savannah, Georgia, and assassinate President Barack Obama. The alleged plot was on behalf of the "FEAR" militia for the long term purpose of overthrowing the government.
- October 17, 2012: Mohammad Rezwanul Ahsan Nafis, aged 21, was arrested in a plot to bomb the Manhattan office of the Federal Reserve Bank on behalf of "our beloved Sheikh Osama bin Laden". His motive was to destroy the economy and possibly force the cancellation of the Presidential election. The suspect, who had a student visa, was a Bangladeshi national who moved to the U.S. to launch a terrorist attack. His arrest was the result of a joint FBI-New York City Police sting operation. The suspect was pulling the detonator on a disabled 1000-pound van bomb when he was arrested. On August 9, 2013, Nafis was sentenced to 30 years in prison. Prior to his sentencing Nafis wrote a letter apologizing to the people of America and New York for his actions, which he said were caused by personal and family problems and said he is now pro-American.
- November 29, 2012: Raees Alam Qazi and his brother Sheheryar Alam Qazi of Florida, naturalized citizens of Pakistani descent, were arrested for being in the aspirational stages of a plot to attack New York City. Raees Alam Qazi is alleged to be inspired by Al Queda and of trying to contact terrorists abroad. On June 11, 2015, Raees and Sheheryar were sentenced to 35 and 20 years respectively for the plot and attacking federal officials while in custody.
- June 19, 2013: Two middle aged upstate New York men, Scott Crawford and Eric J. Feight, were arrested by the FBI in an alleged plot to target a political figure, reported to be President Obama, and a Muslim group deemed enemies of Israel, by constructing and using an X-Ray Gun that was described by the FBI as "useful and "functional". Obama was believed by the pair to be allowing Muslims into the country without background checks. An investigation was launched when a synagogue and the Ku Klux Klan, whom Crawford was a member of, told authorities that Crawford tried to recruit them to take part in the alleged plot.
- December 13, 2013: Terry Lee Loewen, an Avionics Technician, was arrested for attempting to bomb the Wichita Mid-Continent Airport. A Muslim-convert inspired by Anwar Al-Awlaki, he is alleged to have spent several months planning a suicide attack with a car-load of explosives.
- 2014: Brandon Orlando Baldwin and Olajuwon Ali Davis allegedly plotted to kill St. Louis County, Missouri Prosecuting Attorney Robert McCulloch and Ferguson, Missouri Police Chief Tom Jackson as well as bomb the Gateway Arch in reaction to the shooting of Michael Brown. The suspects were caught as a result of an undercover operation.
- March 26, 2015: Hasan R. Edmonds, an Illinois National Guardsman, and his cousin, Jonas M. Edmonds, arrested in an alleged terrorist plot against a Northern Illinois military base. The alleged plot involved Hasan leaving the country and Jones using Hasan's uniform to gain access. The motive was to bring "the flames of war to the heart" of America. Alleged plot broken up by sting operation.
- April 2, 2015: Two women from Queens, New York, 28-year-old Noelle Velentzas and 31-year-old Asia Siddiqui, arrested on charges of trying to detonate explosives in the US. They had purchased propane tanks. It is believed to be first case of a women-only conceived terror plot in the US. Suspects caught in a sting operation. Siddiqui was alleged to have al-Qaeda contact. On May 7, the two pled not guilty.
- April 10, 2015: The FBI arrested 20 year old John Booker Jr. (aka Mohammad Abdullah Hassan) and a co-conspirator, 28 year old Alexander Evan Blair, after Booker made the final connections to arm a 1,000 pound bomb inside a mini-van near Fort Riley, Kansas. Booker intended the inert device, built by undercover FBI agents that Booker had solicited to assist him with his attack, to be detonated at the base hospital. Prior to his attack, Booker made several martyrdom videos in which he stated that he was conducting the suicide attack against a military target in support of the Islamic State. Booker received a 30-year sentence as part of a plea agreement in which he pled guilty to attempting to use a weapon of mass destruction and attempting to destroy government property by an explosive device. His accomplice, Alexander Blair, pled guilty to Conspiracy and was sentenced to 15 months, admitting to providing Booker with money to fund the attack knowing what was planned.
- April 10, 2015: the FBI arrested 63-year old Robert Rankin Doggart, of Signal Mountain, Tennessee, who ran as a congressional candidate in 2014. He was wiretapped explaining plans to raise a militia to burn down a mosque, school and cafeteria and gun down Muslims in an enclave called Islamberg in New York. He planned to amass M4 carbines, pistols, Molotov cocktails and machetes, saying "We will offer [our] lives as collateral to prove our commitment to our God," and "We shall be Warriors who inflict horrible numbers of casualties upon the enemies," and "If it gets down to the machete, we will cut them to shreds." He has a Ph.D. from a diploma mill and an ordination from an ordination mill. He pled guilty on May 15, 2015.
- June 17, 2015: Fareed Mumuni, 21 of Staten Island and Munther Omar Saleh, 20 of Queens arrested for allegedly trying to conspire to assist ISIS in committing an attack in the New York area. Both suspects allegedly charged at law enforcement trying to arrest them with a knife.
- July 3–5, 2015: FBI Director James Comey said his agency disrupted multiple July 4 weekend terror plots.
- July 13, 2015: Alexander Ciccolo, 23, of Adams, Massachusetts, the son of a Boston Police Captain, is arrested in a plot to attack a state college and broadcast executions of students on the internet. The suspect, who was turned in by his father, was said to be inspired by ISIS and reportedly characterized America as "Satan" and "disgusting". Ciccolo had guns and possible bomb making equipment.
- August 2015: federal jury convicted Glendon Scott Crawford (member of the Loyal White Knights of the Ku Klux Klan), from Galway, New York for plotting to kill Muslims and the president Barack Obama with a selfmade radiation weapon, found guilty for the crimes of guilty of conspiring to use a weapon of mass destruction and distributing information relating to weapons of mass destruction. His arrests came after he was reported by members of two local synagogues that Crawford had approached to fund and plan his attack. In December 2016, Crawford was sentenced to 30 years of prison and lifetime supervised release, attempting to produce and use a radiological dispersal device, conspiracy to use a weapon of mass destruction and distributing information relating to weapons of mass destruction. He is the US citizen to be found guilty of attempting to build and use a radiological dispersal device.
- August 22, 2015: Kevin Norton, 18, and James Stumbo, 27 of Iowa were arrested in a plot to shoot up the 2015 Pokémon World Championships. The two posted status updates and images of their weaponry on social media, which were noticed by various Pokémon fans who treated them as supposed threats against the tournament. The two were arrested on charges of unlicensed possession of firearms and ammunition. The weapons recovered were a recently purchased Remington shotgun, an AR-15, a hunting knife and several hundred rounds of ammunition.
- November 11, 2015: Robert Curtis Doyle, Ronald Beasley Chaney III and Charles Daniel Halderman from Virginia were arrested trying to buy weapons and explosives from an undercover agent. The attackers plotted to assault and kill a silver and coin dealer and use the money to finance a ring of attacks against black churches and synagogues. In June 2016, Ronald Chaney was sentenced to 105 months in prison, Robert Curtis Doyle to 17 ½ years and Charles Halrderman was sentenced the following month to 7 years.
- September 17–19, 2016: a series of three constructed bombs exploded, and several unexploded devices were discovered in the New York metropolitan area following a subsequent shooting in Linden, New Jersey during a statewide manhunt for the suspected perpetrator. The bombings and additional shootout left 33 people wounded, but no fatalities were reported. Federal investigators determined these explosive devices were deliberately set and identified them as part of a terrorist act.
- October 14, 2016: Curtis Wayne Allen, 49; Patrick Eugene Stein, 47; and Gavin Wayne Wright, 49 are arrested in Garden City, Kansas after an eight month long investigation conducted by the FBI finds that the men were plotting to use explosives to kill an estimated 120 persons at an apartment complex inhabited by Somali immigrants. The men claimed allegiance to a far right nationalist group called "The Crusaders". Stein was sentenced to 30 years, Wright to 26 years, and Allen to 25 years for conspiracy to use a weapon of mass destruction.

=== 2020s ===
- March 2020: Timothy Wilson, a member of the Atomwaffen Division, was planning to bomb a COVID-19 hospital with a car bomb. He was killed in a shootout with the FBI on March 24.
- January 2024: Two brothers from Astoria, Queens, Andrew and Angelo Hatziagelis, were arrested and charged with over 130 crimes after allegedly hoarding explosives and ghost guns and maintaining a "hit list" that targeted celebrities and authority figures. The brothers, who police described as having "evil intent" and "anti-society" views with an admiration for Charles Manson, reportedly had eight fully operable bombs.
- January 2025: Riley English turned herself in to U.S. Capitol police, saying she had planned to assassinate Treasury Secretary Scott Bessent with a Molotov cocktail. English said she had originally planned to kill Secretary of Defense Pete Hegseth and/or Speaker of the House Mike Johnson, but switched her focus to Bessent after learning that his confirmation hearing was that day. English was originally identified as a man in the news but was later confirmed to be a transgender woman.
- October 2025: The FBI foiled an ISIS inspired terror attack, planned to take place during Halloween weekend in Michigan. They arrested a large number of suspects, mostly young individuals aged 16 to 20, who had been preparing by training with AK-47 rifles and discussing the attack in online chats using "pumpkin day" as a code for Halloween. Coordinated raids in Dearborn and Inkster prevented the attack.
- An 18-year-old male from Mint Hill, North Carolina was arrested for planning to attack a grocery store and a Burger King, the latter of which he worked at, on New Year's Eve 2025. According to the FBI, the individual was a supporter of the Islamic State and wanted to target non-Muslims, LGBT people and law enforcement.

== See also ==
- Attacks on the United States
- Crime in the United States
- Domestic terrorism in the United States
- Hate crime laws in the United States
- Lynching in the United States
- Mass racial violence in the United States
- Outline of terrorism in the United States
- Political violence in the United States
- Radicalism in the United States
  - Radical right (United States)
- Timeline of terrorist attacks in the United States
- United States and state terrorism
  - United States and state-sponsored terrorism
