= QGDGXQ =

QGDGXQ (Chinese: 全国打拐解救儿童寻亲 pinyin: quánguó dǎguǎi jiějiù értóng xún qīn English: National Crackdown Tracing Rescued Children) is China's system for identifying and reuniting kidnapped children with their parents. The program's national database, run by the Ministry of Civil Affairs, went online on 19 September 2015. The database contains children's personally identifiable information as well as DNA profiles which are matched to the profiles of parents collected by local police departments.

Within two days of the program's launch, more than two million people visited the site and 284 freed children were identified.

== See also ==
- Kidnapping in China
- Law Enforcement National Data Exchange
