= FBI Science and Technology Branch =

Science and Technology Branch
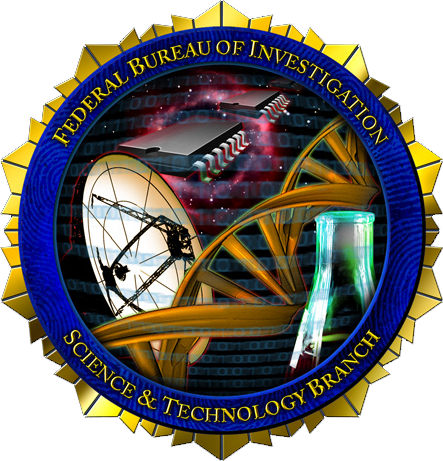
- Science and Technology Branch emblem
- Active: July 2006 – present (20 years)
- Country: United States
- Agency: Federal Bureau of Investigation
- Headquarters: J. Edgar Hoover Building; Washington, D.C.
- Abbreviation: STB

Structure
- Subunits: Criminal Justice Information Services Division; Laboratory Division; Operational Technology Division

Commanders
- Current commander: Executive Assistant Director Robert Brown

The Science and Technology Branch (STB) is a service within the Federal Bureau of Investigation (FBI) that comprises three separate divisions and three program offices. The goal when it was founded in July 2006 was to centralize the leadership and management of the three divisions. The mission of the STB is discover, develop, and deliver innovative science and technology so that intelligence and innovative investigation is enhanced.

== Leadership ==
The Science and Technology branch is currently overseen by Darrin E. Jones, who is the executive assistant director. Within the Science and Technology Branch there are three divisions. The first is the Criminal Justice Information Services Division, which is run by Douglas Lindquist. The second division is the Laboratory Division which is overseen by G. Clayton Grigg. Lastly, the Operational Technology Division is overseen by Brian K. Brooks. The Science and Technology Branch also has a workforce of over 6,200 employees: Special Agents, Forensic Scientists, Intelligence Analysts, and Professional Support Personnel.

== History ==
The Science and Technology Branch was founded by former FBI director Robert Mueller in July 2006. At that time the first executive assistant director, Kerry E. Haynes was appointed. Following his leadership of two years Robert Mueller then appointed a new executive assistant director, Louis E. Grever in October 2012. Grever served for four years in this position until his replacement Steven Martinez took leadership on May 9, 2012. In January 2014 Robert Mueller appointed Amy Hess as the new executive assistant director in which she served until she was promoted to the position of Special Agent in Charge at the FBI Louisiana branch. After her departure from the Science and Technology Branch in 2016, Robert Mueller appointed Christopher M. Piehota who is the current Science and Technology Branch Executive Assistant Director.

== Organization ==
- Internet Governance Program Office (IGPO)
- 5G Program Office
- Lawful Access Office
- Criminal Justice Information Services Division (CJIS)
  - Operational Programs Branch
  - Information Services Branch
- Laboratory Division (LD)
- Operational Technology Division (OTD)
  - Technical Operations and Development Branch
  - Technical Collections Branch
  - Technical Analysis Branch

== Departments ==
=== Forensic Science ===
Forensic Science is a service that is run and overseen by the Science and Technology Branch, and is used by local, state, and federal authorities. Forensic science covers a wide range of subjects including:

- Biometric Analysis, which provides training, reporting, testimony, and technical support for latent print and DNA examinations.
- Scientific Analysis, which provides reporting, training, testimony, and support for cryptanalysis, chemistry, firearms, questioned documents, and evidence examinations.
- Operational Response, which provides the collection, documentation, recording, preserving, and transporting of evidence. This includes chemical, biological, radiological, or nuclear materials from crime scenes within the U.S. and abroad.

=== Operational Technology ===
Operational Technology is a service that is run and overseen by the Science and Technology Branch, that is used for all operational aspects of FBI investigations and programs. The services that they offer include:

- Digital Forensics, which is the collection and examination of digital evidence that is gathered via computers, audio files, video recordings, images, and cell phones.
- Electronic Surveillance, which develops and deploys tools and techniques to lawfully intercept wired and wireless communication networks. This information can then be used to track, and locate interests vital to an operation.
- Tactical Operations, which deploy systems, tools, and equipment used in specific entries and covert searches.

=== Information Sharing ===
Information Sharing is a service that is run and overseen by the Science and Technology Branch which is used nationally and sometimes internationally to aid in the investigation and capture of wanted criminals and other important missions. They provide the following services:

- Crime Reporting, which is collecting, publishing, and archiving uniform crime statistics from nearly 18,000 reporting agencies. An example of this is the Uniform Crime Report.
- Biometrics, which is sharing, importing, and deciphering fingerprints, iris, and facial scans.
- Law Enforcement Online, which is a closed communication network that allows law enforcement across the United States to share information.
- Criminal Background Checks for employers and federal/state commissions.
- Name Checks for firearm sales, which cross references names with vital information regarding the criteria for qualifying for buying a firearm.

== Services provided ==
- The National DNA Index: an important service that is compiled by the STB. It consists of biometric data that is provided by over 190 public law enforcement laboratories. In addition to these national agencies, 90 international law enforcement laboratories that operate in over 50 countries also contribute to this index. The use of the National DNA Index is to help provide a connection between evidence left at crime scenes and a suspect.
- The National Crime Information Center (NCIC): another important service that is regulated by the STB. The use of the NCIC is to compile all data regarding crimes within the United States. The service is available 24 hours a day, 7 days a week, and 365 days a year to all law enforcement agencies in the US. The NCIC compiles data such as property crimes, personal crimes, sex offenses, gang affiliations, witness protections, and the biometrics of those processed. A sub department within this agency is tasked with the reconstruction of documents using pieces of chad (tiny bits of shredded paper). Over 400 small pieces of shredded paper make up a single 8x11 sheet of paper so it requires a large amount of work; the people tasked with this are formally known as questioned document examiners.
- The Regional Computer Forensic Laboratory (RCFL): a service provided by the STB. This service provides support to federal, state, and local law enforcement agencies with regards to collecting and examining digital forensics. The Program supports investigations in the following fields:
  - Child Pornography
  - Cybercrime
  - Financial Crime
  - Fraud
  - Property crime
  - Terrorism
  - Theft
  - Trade secret theft
  - Violent crime
- The Regional Computer Analysis and Response Team (CART): is another service that falls under information sharing within the FBI. This team is tasked with sifting through over 37,000 pieces of data a year in hopes to find connections to on going investigations. In 2015 CART analyzed over 9.77 Petabytes of data, or 9,770 Terabytes. CART has over 500 employees and consists of both private and public workers. They are located at the FBI's National Headquarters, but also have mobile units.
- The Regional Computer Forensics Laboratories (RCFL) are part of a national network of state-of-the-art, full-service forensics laboratories and training centers sponsored by the FBI.
- The Uniform Crime Reporting Program (UCR) was established in 1929 with the task of compiling crime data such as murder, theft, rape, and robbery, from databases across the United States. Today the UCR is made up of four reporting programs:
  - National Incident Based Reporting System (NIBRS)
  - Hate Crime Statistics
  - The Summary Reporting System (SRS)
  - Law Enforcement Officers Killed and Assaulted (LEOKA)

Today more than 18,000 agencies such as local, state, federal, and university contribute to the UCR and allow for 4 national reports each year.
