= Kidnapping in China =

Kidnapping in China is an issue that has become more important in the People's Republic of China since the 1980s. Since the 1990s, tougher laws against kidnapping have been established. Chinese authorities have also investigated in this regard.

== History ==
During the Second Opium War, when an estimated 18,000 British and French Soldiers had returned to the coastal forts, the Chinese response included the kidnapping of 38 Anglo-French negotiating party members, of whom 26 of them died in captivity.

During World War II, thousands of Chinese were kidnapped by the Japanese and sent to Japan to work as forced laborers. Many Chinese were forced to work in deadly conditions at coal mines in Kyushu and Honshu.

In 2015, the Chinese government launched the QGDGXQ database, a system for identifying and reuniting freed children.

As of 2018, the Chinese government had notoriously kidnapped and imprisoned prominent businessmen, including Yang Zhihui, Wu Xiaohui, and Guo Guangchang. This is part of the crackdown on "market manipulation", yet critics condemn the actions of the Chinese government, stating that they are breaking UN human rights regulations and censoring freedom of speech in China.

== Studies ==
During the 19th century, Johannes Von Gumpach had described the issue of kidnapping as "One of the most common crimes in China." According to Francis Dunlap Gamewell, kidnapping was a common crime in Shanghai. He noted that kidnappers were mostly female.

Carl Crow, who traveled to China during the wars, had described the prevalence of kidnapping in China as a "well-organized business in China carried out with a large degree of success".

== Prevalence ==
Kidnapping has become a growing business in China. Steve Vickers of Kroll Associates has reportedly noted that some common scenarios of kidnapping in China include kidnapping for ransom and kidnapping of a foreigner (commonly in Hong Kong or Macau).

=== Child abductions ===
As of 2013, an estimated 70,000 children were kidnapped in China every year, although the Chinese government reported fewer than 10,000 kidnappings. According to the United States Department of State, estimates are closer to 20,000.

Some children are reported to have been sold into adoption overseas. The adoption agencies of China received considerable donations from foreign parents when they adopted, sometimes as much as $5,000. Such agencies have been known to purchase children from human traffickers, although such cases are usually rare.

==== Government complicity ====
A 2009 report by the Los Angeles Times detailed cases of the government family planning offices in local communities participating in child abductions, intimidation of whistleblowers, dereliction of duty, and falsifying documents to create the appearance of abducted children being wilfully abandoned. In Zhenyuan, where a large portion children adopted overseas are believed to have been kidnapped, local government officials responded to media enquiries by accusing the victims' families of being greedy and stating that the abducted children are better off without their birth parents.

=== Kidnapping of foreign businessmen ===
In Guangdong, during the year 1994, "economic crimes" topped the list of criminal cases and about 46 debt-related hostage cases were acknowledged and investigated by the authorities. The chief procurator, Wang Jun had noted that at least 171 hostages involved in debt-related incidents had been freed by the authorities of Guangdong.

== Crackdown ==
From the period of 1991 to 1996, Chinese police freed an estimated 88,000 kidnapped women and children. During this period, about 143,000 kidnappers were arrested.

In 2011, Chinese police asserted that they had rescued over 13,000 children and 23,000 women in the last two years. Government officials had noted that they would impose harsher punishments on those who purchase kidnapped children.

In September 2013, Chinese security forces had rescued 92 children, and arrested 301 suspected kidnappers.

According to a report from October 2013, Beijing has tried to combat kidnappings. According to Xinhua news agency, since 2009, police had rescued over 54,000 children and eliminated 11,000 traffickers.

== Law ==
Kidnapping is illegal in China under the following articles of the Criminal Law:

Article 238 Whoever unlawfully detains another person or unlawfully deprives the personal freedom of another person by any other means shall be sentenced to fixed-term imprisonment of not more than three years, criminal detention, public surveillance or deprivation of political rights. If he resorts to battery or humiliation, he shall be given a heavier punishment.

Whoever commits the crime mentioned in the preceding paragraph and causes serious injury to the victim shall be sentenced to fixed-term imprisonment of not less than three years but not more than 10 years; if he causes death to the victim, he shall be sentenced to fixed-term imprisonment of not less than 10 years. If he causes injury, disability or death to the victim by violence, he shall be convicted and punished in accordance with the provisions of Article 234 or 232 of this Law.

Whoever unlawfully detains or confines another person in order to get payment of a debt shall be punished in accordance with the provisions of the preceding two paragraphs.

Where a functionary of a State organ commits any of the crimes mentioned in the preceding three paragraphs by taking advantage of his functions and powers, he shall be given a heavier punishment in accordance with the provisions in the preceding three paragraphs correspondingly.

Article 239 Whoever kidnaps another person for the purpose of extorting money or property or kidnaps another person as a hostage shall be sentenced to fixed-term imprisonment of not less than 10 years or life imprisonment and also to a fine or confiscation of property; if he causes death to the kidnapped person or kills the kidnapped person, he shall be sentenced to death and also to confiscation of property.

Whoever steals a baby or an infant for the purpose of extorting money or property shall be punished in accordance with the provisions of the preceding paragraph.

In 1991, the Standing Committee of the National People's Congress addressed the need to act against kidnapping for sale of women and children, kidnapping for blackmailing, purchase of abducted women and children, as well as the abuse of office to inhibit the rescue of kidnapped women and children.

Such concerns led to the familiarization of a criminal law. Per Article 141, penalties for the abduction, purchase, sale, and trafficking of women and children were put in place. Later, in 1997, the penalties were increased to the present terms.

== Forced disappearances ==
Kidnapping by the government, known as the enforced disappearances, have increased under CCP general secretary Xi Jinping's rule since 2013. New laws grant the police unrestricted power to hold detainees secretly for indefinite periods.

== See also ==
- Forced disappearance § China
- Extraordinary rendition § China
- Lee Ming-che disappearances
- Causeway Bay Books disappearances
