= Mountaineer Militia =

American terrorist group

West Virginia Mountaineer Militia
- Leader: Floyd "Ray" Looker
- Dates active: 1995– October 1996
- Active regions: Clarksburg, West Virginia, United States
- Ideology: American nationalism National conservatism Libertarianism; Sovereign citizen movement
- Political position: Right-wing

Mountaineer Militia was an American local anti-government paramilitary group, members of which plotted to blow up an FBI building in Clarksburg, West Virginia in 1996. The group also used the name West Virginia Mountaineer Militia, and had ties with another militias from other states.

== Plot and arrest ==
On October 11, 1996, seven men having connections with the Mountaineer Militia, a local anti-government paramilitary group, were arrested on charges of plotting to blow up the Federal Bureau of Investigation's Criminal Justice Information Services Division in Clarksburg, West Virginia, after a 16-month investigation. The group had even considered the killing United States Senator Jay Rockefeller and Federal Reserve chairman Alan Greenspan in a "holy war" against the "tiranous" U.S. government.

While members of the group had been assembling large quantities of explosives and blasting caps, militia leader Floyd Raymond Looker obtained blueprints of the FBI facility from a Clarksburg, West Virginia firefighter. Plastic explosives were confiscated by law enforcement officials at five locations in West Virginia, Pennsylvania, and Ohio. Looker was taken into custody after arranging to sell the blueprints for $50,000 to an undercover FBI agent, whom he believed to be a representative of an international terrorist group. In 1998 Looker was sentenced to 18 years in prison. Two other defendants were sentenced on explosives charges, and the firefighter drew a year in prison for providing blueprints. The charges with those who were judge include conspiracy to manufacture explosives, transport explosives across state lines and place them near the FBI's Criminal Justice Information Services center in Clarksburg. Two of the arrested, Edward Moore and Jack Phillips, were charged for the making and dealing in explosives, including homemade nitroglycerine and C-4. Before the arrests, Moore said to Mr. Looker and the Government informer that he had perfected a homemade rocket-propelled grenade. Also, the authorities said, the group held a training practices in which they detonated an improvised explosive that left a hole two feet wide and four feet deep.

Other arrested were James R. Rogers, (40) a firefighter from Clarksburg. He is accused for the providing of 12 photographs of blueprints of the FBI complex, including plans for the underground computer center, with the objective to attack that part of the complex. The group also posted a video on the internet called "America Under Siege," alleging acts authorized by the federal government against its own people.

=== Convictions ===
On March 29, 1998, the leader Floyd "Ray" Looker was convicted and sentenced to 18 years in a federal prison. Looker (57), was among the first to be charged under a 1994 antiterrorism law that makes it a crime to provide material resources to terrorists activities. While Looker pleaded guilty to the conspiracy charges, on several occasions he mentioned that the plans and materials he had couldn't have made the attack successful. James R. Rogers, was sentenced to 10 years.
