= Law Enforcement National Data Exchange =

The Law Enforcement National Data Exchange (N-DEx) brings together data from criminal justice agencies throughout the United States, including incident and case reports, booking and incarceration data, and parole/probation information. N-DEx detects relationships between people, vehicles/property, location, and/or crime characteristics. N-DEx is housed at the FBI's Criminal Justice Information Services Division in West Virginia.

== Awards ==
- GCN Awards 2009 Government Computer News Agency Award
- Christopher Columbus Fellowship Foundation 2010 Award for Information Sharing
