= Tyler poison gas plot =

2003 American domestic terrorism plan in Tyler, Texas

The Tyler poison gas plot was an American domestic terrorism plan in Tyler, Texas, thwarted in April 2003 with the arrest of three individuals and the seizure of a cyanide gas bomb along with a large arsenal. Authorities had been investigating the white supremacist conspirators for several years and the case received little media coverage and limited attention in public from the government.

== Conspirators ==
The three individuals were linked to white supremacist and anti-government groups. They were:

- William Joseph Krar, born 1940, originally from Connecticut then Goffstown New Hampshire
- Judith L. Bruey, Krar's common-law wife
- Edward S. Feltus of Old Bridge, New Jersey, an employee of Monmouth County Department of Human Services Feltus was a member of the New Jersey Militia.

Krar was alleged to have made his living travelling across the country selling bomb components and other weapons to violent underground anti-government groups. After leaving community college, he moved to New Hampshire and first opened a restaurant and then in 1984 began selling weapons without a license under the name International Development Corporation (IDC). His father was a gunsmith. He was convicted and fined for impersonating a police officer in 1985. He worked for a building supply company and often traveled to Central America - though not on company business - until the company closed in 1988, when he stopped filing tax returns for IDC. He met Bruey in 1989.

== Investigation ==
Federal authorities had been observing Krar since at least 1995, when ATF agents investigated a possible plot to bomb government buildings, but Krar was not charged. In June 2001, police investigating a fire at Krar's Goffstown storage facility found guns and ammunition, but were persuaded this was legitimate as part of his business.

"Hope this package gets to you O.K. We would hate to have this fall into the wrong hands."

— Note from Krar to Feltus

Since the September 11 attacks, their attention was focused on Middle Eastern terrorist activities. They were only alerted to Krar's recent activities by accident when he mailed Feltus a package of counterfeit birth certificates from North Dakota, Vermont, and West Virginia, and United Nations Multinational Force and Observers and Defense Intelligence Agency IDs in January 2002. The package was mistakenly delivered to a Staten Island man who alerted police. In August 2002, FBI investigators spoke to Feltus, who admitted to being in a militia and to be storing weapons.

In January 2003, a Nashville state trooper stopped Krar in a routine traffic stop and found drugs, chemicals, false IDs and weapons in the car. Krar was arrested and the FBI were alerted. Krar was bailed and one month later an FBI lab reported that white powder found in the car was sodium cyanide; an arrest warrant was issued for Krar.

In April 2003, investigators found weapons, pure sodium cyanide and white supremacist material in a storage facility in Noonday, Texas rented by Krar and Bruey. More weapons were found at their Tyler, Texas home. The weapons included at least 100 other conventional bombs (including briefcase bombs and pipe bombs), machine guns, an assault rifle, an unregistered silencer, and 500,000 rounds of ammunition. The chemical stockpile seized included sodium cyanide, hydrochloric acid, nitric acid and acetic acid. The cyanide was in a device with acid that would trigger its release as a gas bomb.

== Sentencing ==
On May 4, 2004, Krar was sentenced to 135 months in prison after he pleaded guilty to building and possessing chemical weapons. Bruey was sentenced to 57 months after pleading to "conspiracy to possess illegal weapons."

As per a lookup at the Bureau of Prisons prisoner database on September 18, 2012, Krar (09751-078) died in prison on May 7, 2009, Bruey (10601-078) was released on May 30, 2008, and no information is available for Edward Feltus.

== Reactions ==
Paul Krugman writing in the New York Times noted how John Ashcroft and the US Justice Department gave no comment or press release about the case, in contrast to other foiled plots of international terrorism. Krugman's piece was noted in Congress by John Conyers. The Christian Science Monitor noted in December 2003 "there have been two government press releases and a handful of local stories, but no press conference and no coverage in the national newspapers."
