= 2011 Spokane bombing attempt =

Failed bombing attempt

Coordinates: 47.6591°N 117.4181°W

Spokane bombing attempt
- Location: Spokane, Washington, United States
- Date: January 17, 2011
- Attack type: Failed bombing
- Weapon: Pipe bomb
- Deaths: 0
- Injuries: 0
- Perpetrator: Kevin William Harpham
- Motive: White supremacy

Map of Washington highlighting Spokane County (location of the bomb attempt)

The Spokane bombing attempt occurred on January 17, 2011, when a radio-controlled shaped-charge pipe bomb was found and defused in Spokane, Washington, along the route of that year's Martin Luther King Jr. memorial march.

On March 9, 2011, the Federal Bureau of Investigation (FBI) arrested Kevin William Harpham, 36, of Addy, Washington, a white supremacist who acted alone (a "lone wolf"). On December 20, 2011, he was sentenced to 32 years in prison for the attempted bombing.

== Bomb plot and discovery ==
The bomb had a "welded blast plate" and it also contained shrapnel, specifically 128 quarter-ounce fishing weights, laced with brodifacoum, an anticoagulant rat poison, which prevents bleeding wounds from coagulating; it also contained human feces which causes infections. The pipe bomb was viable and designed to be directional, which means that it was crafted to spray shrapnel into the street where the parade marchers would pass through; had it exploded, the bomb could have caused multiple casualties.

According to the FBI, the bombing may have been racially motivated, and its timing was likely not a coincidence. The New York Times said that the bomb had been reported to police at roughly 9:25 a.m. that morning.

The bomb was found in a Swiss Army brand backpack that also contained two T-shirts. One of the shirts mentioned a rally against cancer in Stevens County, Washington, while the other mentioned a 2009 play put on by students at Chewelah, Washington high school (also in Stevens County). The backpack with visible wires was noticed by three parade workers on a bench in downtown Spokane, about a half-hour before the parade was set to begin. Police sent bomb-sniffing dogs, a robot, and specially trained officers to the location where the bomb was found. After the bomb was defused by the local Spokane County sheriff's bomb squad, the backpack was sent to the FBI Laboratory in Quantico, Virginia, for further analysis. The parade was quickly rerouted.

== Arrest, conviction, and sentence of perpetrator ==
The FBI offered a $20,000 reward for any information leading to the capture of those responsible. On March 9, 2011, the FBI Hostage Rescue Team arrested white supremacist and separatist Kevin William Harpham, 36, of Addy, Washington, in connection with the bombing attempt. Harpham was a "lone wolf" who acted alone. Harpham was a fire support specialist in the U.S. Army from 1996 to 1999, and later he was a member of the racist National Alliance movement and a contributor to its website/magazine Vanguard News Network, where he posted more than a thousand articles which espoused racism and antisemitism. Harpham was identified as the perpetrator based on evidence which was primarily collected during a forensic examination of the bomb and backpack, which contained body hair and several individuals' DNA, including DNA which was matched to the DNA sample that Harpham had given to the Armed Forces Repository of Specimen Samples for the Identification of Remains when he was in the U.S. Army. Investigators were then able to match the purchase of bomb components to Harpham's purchases in the Colville, Washington, area.

On May 3, 2011, Harpham's lawyers requested a four-month delay in his federal trial for attempted use of a weapon of mass destruction, contending that Harpham faced life in prison if he were convicted of the charge and they also stated that they would need more time to prepare for the trial. Harpham pleaded not guilty, and he remained in jail without bail since the time of his arrest. On May 20, 2011, U.S. District Judge Justin Quackenbush agreed to delay Harpham's trial until August 22, 2011.

On September 14, 2011, Harpham pleaded guilty to setting the device, admitted to attempted use of a weapon of mass destruction and hate crimes. On December 20, 2011, hours before he was due to be sentenced, Harpham tried to withdraw his guilty plea, claiming that the device in his backpack didn't meet the legal definition of a bomb. After rejecting the request and expressing disbelief at Harpham's claim that the device was not intended to hit parade-goers, Quackenbush sentenced him to 32 years in prison, followed by supervised release for life. He will also be required to complete counselling. His appeals were rejected. Harpham is imprisoned at United States Penitentiary, Lompoc in Lompoc, California; he is scheduled for release in 2039.

== Legacy ==
The bombing attempt has become a case study for FBI investigations.

== See also ==
- Improvised explosive device
