= FBI Criminal Justice Information Services Division =

US Federal Bureau of Investigation division

The Criminal Justice Information Services Division (CJIS) is a division of the United States Federal Bureau of Investigation (FBI) located in Clarksburg, West Virginia. The CJIS was established in February 1992 and is the largest division of the FBI.

The CJIS provides services such as crime statistics and criminal background checks to law enforcement, national security and intelligence partners, and the general public.

== CJIS Overview ==
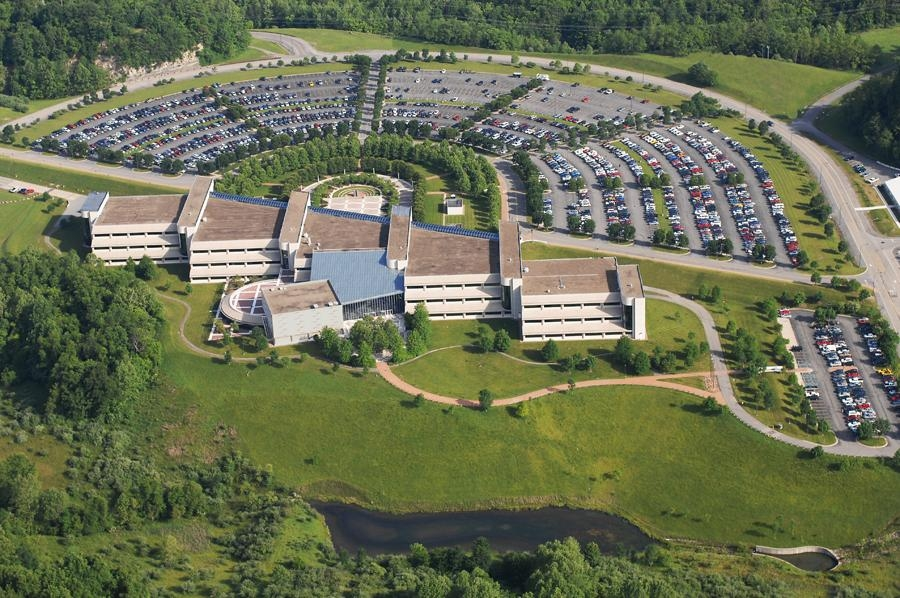
Aerial shot of the CJIS facility in Clarksburg, West Virginia in 2009

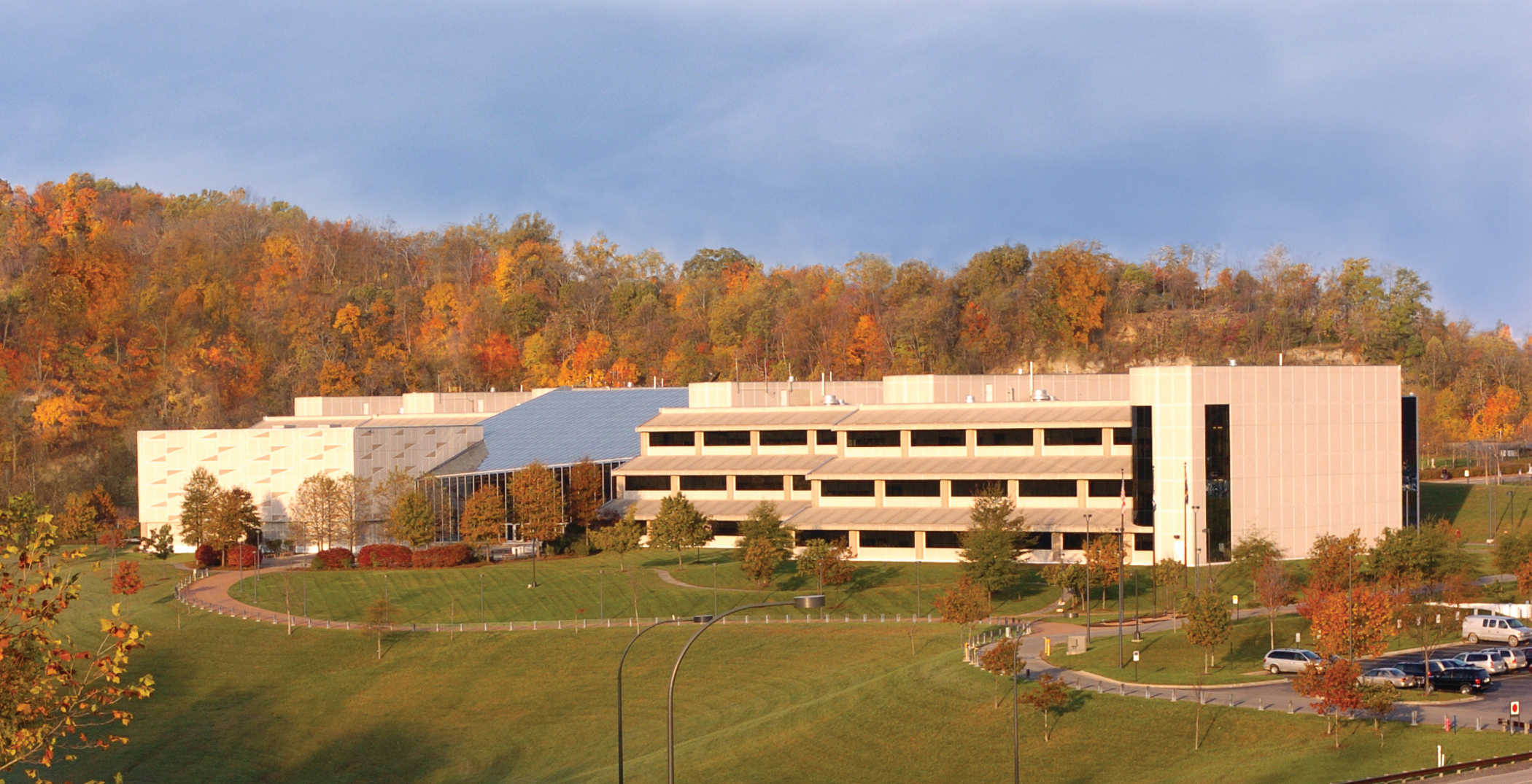
FBI Criminal Justice Information Services Division facility

The CJIS Division is the largest division of the FBI Science and Technology Branch and is located in a half million square foot main facility on a 986-acre (4.0 km^{2}) tract in Clarksburg, West Virginia. CJIS services located at this site include the National Crime Information Center (NCIC), Integrated Automated Fingerprint Identification System (IAFIS), Law Enforcement Enterprise Portal (LEEP), National Instant Criminal Background Check System (NICS), Uniform Crime Reporting (UCR), and the Law Enforcement National Data Exchange (N-DEx).

The mission of CJIS is to reduce terrorist and criminal activities by maximizing the ability to provide timely and relevant criminal justice information to the FBI and to qualified law enforcement, criminal justice, civilian, academic, employment, and licensing agencies concerning individuals, stolen property, criminal organizations and activities, and other law enforcement-related data.

The agency employs statisticians who compile data from law enforcement into a series of regular reports detailing the state of crime across the country.

== See also ==
- Integrated Automated Fingerprint Identification System (IAFIS)
- National Incident-Based Reporting System (NIBRS)
