= Negg =

Negg may refer to

- NEGG, the trading symbol of Newegg
- Negg minute, a meme
- Negging, a backhanded compliment used by pickup artists

== See also ==
- NEG (disambiguation)
