= Keys to the VIP =

- Keys to the VIP - title screen
- Starring: Chris Greidanus
- Country of origin: Canada
- No. of episodes: 39

Production
- Running time: 30 min (13 Episodes)

Original release
- Network: Comedy Network
- Release: October 31, 2006 – 2008

Keys to the VIP (A Professional League for Players) is a Canadian reality television comedy game show that aired on the Comedy Network and Fuse TV. The game involved two self-proclaimed players competing against each other to pick up women in a real bar. The two contestants went against each other in rounds to complete different objectives all related to seducing women. Hidden cameras recorded all the action that occurred, with four "expert" pickup artists judging to decide which of the two contestants did better picking up women during a round. The winner was the contestant that wins at least two out of the three rounds, and went on to win a party in a private VIP room with a select group of friends.

== Hosts and judges ==
The four hosts who oversaw the progress of the contestants across the town in Kai Lounge. Their personalities descend from the four corners of the male psyche.

- Alen (Alen Bubich) - The cold, calculated master of pick-up analysis
- Peachez (Emeka Bronson) - An ex-all-star jock inspired seduction specialist
- Sheldon - Mysteriously coy and unorthodox philosopher
- Chris (Chris Greidanus) - A hopelessly romantic man of integrity

The roles are based on the real-life personalities of the hosts, but are exaggerated to help them come up with specific judging criteria.

== Production team ==
- Executive producer - Sean Buckley
- Executive producer - Alen Bubich
- Co-executive producer - Justin Killion
- Senior producer - Jim Kiriakakis
- Director - Justin Harding

== History ==
Alen, Peachez, Sheldon, Chris, and director Justin Harding are the creators of the show. The concept was based on the real-life challenges that Alen, Peachez, and Sheldon would come up with and try out in clubs in Guelph, Canada. Most of the challenges from the show are challenges that the guys had attempted in real life; in fact, the three men came up with many more challenges that the network did not integrate into the show. The pilot was developed and directed by filmmaker Justin Harding a few years before the show aired. Justin Harding remained as the director for all episodes of the three-season run.

Chris was originally in an editing role, and expected to continue this role for the network show. However, the executive producer steered him towards the role of the 'nice guy' on the judging panel. Chris describes being the only "genuine guy" to audition, and he won the role.

== Filming location ==
Episodes of Keys to the VIP were primarily filmed at well-known nightclubs and bars in the Greater Toronto Area. Some of the clubs included Mink (Toronto), Zu Bar (Burlington), and Wetbar (Toronto).

== Reception ==
The show was generally positively received among the PUA community around the world. Users pointed out the fact that real-life situations were being shown and contestants were real, sometimes without enough social skills to pick up women. In-depth analyses of the episodes had been conducted, gathering insights and judging the reactions of women. People pointed out the fact that contestants used mostly their own techniques and charisma instead of canned material taught by the PUA teachers. Also, pieces of information from behind the scenes of the show indicated that the show was real, without paid actors or scenarios. Contestants, identified at the end of each episode, were easy to find on social media, which also added credibility to their performance. The comparisons between this show (KTTV) and another one – The Pickup Artist (TPUA, starring Mystery) – were being made. Both shows were aired roughly the same time. While TPUA was more focused on learning process, the KTTV presented much more real-life interactions with women and was more humorous. The number of episodes (39) and contestants (76) were in favour of KTTV, when comparing to TPUA (respectively: 16 and 17). After the show aired, the judges became a local celebrities in Toronto Area.

== Episode list ==
Ep. Nr	Contestant 1	Contestant 2	Games Played	Winner
1x01	Marc "The Baron"	Kyle "The Terminator"	The Laugh Factor; Recovery; Starving Artist	Kyle "The Terminator"
1x02	"Hurricane" Patrick	Brandon "The Wizard"	Three Approaches; The Digits; Sexy Talent	Brandon "The Wizard"
1x03	Eyal "The Egyptian Prince"	Vida aka "Drego"	The Narcissist; Reverse Golddigger; Angry Girlfriend	Eyal "The Egyptian Prince"
1x04	"Cocoa Butter" Chris	Yakov "The Trapper"	Freestyle; The Dancer; The Hyena	That Guy*
1x05	Mark Sparks	Kyle "The Diesel"	Speed Dial; Call Your Shot; Seduction School	Kyle "The Diesel"
1x06	Dennis aka Hodge	"So Hot Right Now" Josh	Line Off; Questions; Divide and Conquer	"So Hot Right Now" Josh
1x07	"Pretty Boy" Ford	Eryk "The Great"	The Laugh Factor; Recovery; Freestyle	"Pretty Boy" Ford
1x08	"Dainty" Danny	Simon aka Screech	The Dancer; Foot Fetish; The Breakup	"Dainty" Danny
1x09	Mark "The Karaoke Kid"	Dennis "The Lion"	The Palm Reader; Why You Suck; The Dance Off	Mark "The Karaoke Kid"
1x10	John aka Wilk	"Cobra Commander" Phil	Love At First Sight; Seduction School; Quiet On The Set	"Cobra Commander" Phil
1x11	Donny "Danger"	Leo "The Carpenter"	Nip/Tuck; Talented Mr. Ripley; Freestyle	Donny "Danger"
1x12	Captain Karim	Ryan aka Weezer	Fake accent The Box Out; Friend Destroyer	Ryan aka Weezer
1x13	Duane "The Damager"	"Cocky" Kevin	Speed Dial; She's So Silly; Freestyle	"Cocky" Kevin
2x01	Josh "The Matador" Maltin	"Maximum Max" Boateng	Line off Recovery; Divide and conquer	Josh "The Matador" Maltin
2x02	Eyal "The Closer"	Illya "The Ill Kid" Konstantin	Seduction School; Talented Mr. Ripley; Call your Shot	Illya "The Ill Kid" Konstantin
2x03	Justin "Rated R" Rego	Rob "Fromeo" Cavaliere	The Introduction; Sabotage; Angry Girlfriend	Rob "Fromeo"
2x04	Frank "The Tank" Marques	Kyle "Smiles" Gentle	The Opener; Freestyle; The Dancer	Frank "The Tank" Marques
2x05	"Hot Body" Jason	Mike "The Magician"	Reverse Gold Digger; Freestyle; Kiss Close	Mike "The Magician"
2x06	"Party Boy" Jay	Dustin aka "Xerxes"	The Palm Reader; Momma's Boy; Body Shots	Tie - Both Players won
2x07	Kevin "the Hammer"	Alex "Da Vinci"	Love at First Sight; Freestyle; Shaken not Stirred	Alex "Da Vinci"
2x08	"Down" Pat	Steven "New York"	The Opener; Recovery; Divide and Conquer	"Down" Pat
2x09	Keegan "The Playboy"	Jonathan "The Stylist"	Plastic Surgery; Recovery; Mighty Wingman	Keegan "The Playboy"
2x10	Jordan "The Joker"	Christian "The Keeper"	Speed Dial; Freestyle; Recovery	Jordan "The Joker"
2x11	Mitch "The Protege"	Derek "Cajun"	Freestyle; Speed Dial; Recovery	Derek "Cajun"
2x12	58891050}: Wonder"	Nick "Dundee"	The Introduction; Stink Mouth; Shaken Not Stirred	Nick "Dundee"
2x13	Matt "Meatus"	Todd "The Natural"	Sabotage; The Narcissist; Talented Mr. Ripley / Angry Girlfriend	Todd "The Natural"
3x01	Bruno "Casanova"	Andrew "The Dungeon Master"	Reverse Gold digger Speed Dial; Freestyle Kiss	Tie - Both Players won
3x02	Ajay "The Arabian Knight"	Julian "The Bait"	Mr. Icebreaker; Freestyle; Divide and Conquer	Ajay "The Arabian Knight"
3x03	"CraZy" Joe Luca	Malcolm "the Ex"	The Laugh Factor; The Photographer; The Ex-Lover	Malcolm "the Ex"
3x04	Steve "Sphinx"	Pierre "Biscuit"	The Opinion Opener; The Routine; Freestyle	Steve "Sphinx"
3x05	"Will French"	"Soft Top" Thomas	Mr. Photographer; Recovery; Freestyle	"Soft Top" Thomas
3x06	Mike "The Bailiff"	Isaac "The Mama's Boy"	Speed Dial; The Date; The Introduction	That Guy*
3x07	Matt "Punch Line"	Mike "The Spanish Fly"	Ice Breaker; Freestyle; The Crutch	Matt "Punch Line"
3x08	Evan "The Broski"	"Little" Jon	The Opener; Recovery; Divide and Conquer	"Big" Jon
3x09	"Claymax"	Alexander "The Great"	The Jealous Angle; Mr. Icebreaker; Freestyle	"Claymax"
3x10	"Poolboy" Peter	Blake "The Chef"	Mr. Icebreaker; Freestyle; Recovery	Blake "The Chef"
3x11	Marko "The Slavic Thunder"	Thomas "The Heff"	Line Off; Talented Mr. Ripley; Freestyle	Marko "The Slavic Thunder"
3x12	"Rodeo" Ryan	"B-Boy Caution" Jones	Talented Mr. Ripley; Freestyle; Line Off	"B-Boy Caution" Jones
3x13	Eyal; Anthony	Sparks; Justin	Seduction School & The Introduction; Sabotage; The MacGyver	Anthony "The Boy Wonder"

- Season 1 Episode 4 had no declared winner. "That Guy" was randomly selected from the studio.
- Season 2 of Keys to the VIP Premiered November 1, 2007 on The Comedy Network.
- Season 3 of Keys to the VIP Premiered Thursday October 23, 2008 on The Comedy Network featuring the youngest contender on Keys to the VIP ever, 19-year-old Julian.
- "That Guy" appears once again in Season 3 Episode 6, as the judges refused to choose a winner.
- Season 3 Episode 1 had a resulting tie game - both players received the award.
- Season 3 finale, also known as Redemption, featured four of the best previous contenders who didn't win. This episode was structured as an elimination tournament.

== Games ==
Name	Objective
Angry Ex-Girlfriend	Pick-up a woman while a surprise actress pretends to be an angry ex-girlfriend.
The Breakup	Initiate conversation with a woman and get her number, but only after borrowing her cell phone to break up with the "girlfriend".
Body Shots	Initiate body shots at the bar
Call your Shot	Seduce the women your competitor has selected for you to approach
The Comedian	Pretend to be a working comedian and get a woman's opinion on "new material"
Come With Me	Separate a woman from her friends
The Dancer	Get a woman's number while dancing
The Dance Off	Initiate a pick-up by challenging a woman to a dance off
Divide and Conquer	Isolate a woman from her group of friends before attempting a pick-up
Fake Accent	Obtain a girl's number while using a fake accent
Foot Fetish	Initiate a pick-up by confessing to have an intense foot fetish
Freestyle	3 minutes to demonstrate your most impressive seduction technique
The Hyena	Each contestant must retrieve a woman's phone number while his opponent is sent in, determined to steal her away
The Introduction	Get one random woman to introduce you to another random woman
The Laugh Factor	Make a woman laugh
Line Off	Initiate a pick-up using the provided one-liner
Love at First Sight	Initiate a pick-up by admitting that he's fallen in love at first sight
Momma's Boy	Convince a woman she reminds you of your mother
The Narcissist	Get a woman's phone number while only talking about himself and never letting the woman speak
Plastic Surgery	Initiate a pick-up by fishing for a compliment about recent plastic surgery
Palm Reader	Pick-up a woman by performing a detailed palm reading and predicting a romantic outcome
Questions	Obtain a woman's phone number while only speaking in questions
Quiet on the Set	During the pick-up, each contestant must ask the woman to be quiet while he listens intensely to the music playing for 30 seconds because it reminds him of his grandmother
Recovery	Get a woman's phone number after insulting her hair and makeup
Redemption	Complete the challenge that caused your original loss. This game was given to contestants who had previously appeared on the show and lost.
Reverse Gold Digger	Convince a woman to buy you a drink
Seduction School	5 minutes to demonstrate your most impressive seduction techniques
Sexy Talent	Each player must get a woman to reveal and demonstrate a sexy secret talent
Shaken Not Stirred	Turn a drinking game into a kiss
Speed Dial	Obtain a woman's phone number in less than a minute
Starving Artist	Convince a girl that you're an unemployed artist living at home with your parents
Talented Mr. Ripley	Convince a woman that you have the same occupation as her.
Three Approaches	Each player has 5 min to approach three different women
Why You Suck	Initiate conversation with a woman by telling her why she sucks.

== See also ==
- The Pickup Artist
- Blind Date
- Pickup artist
