= Bernard Chang =

Canadian American comic book artist

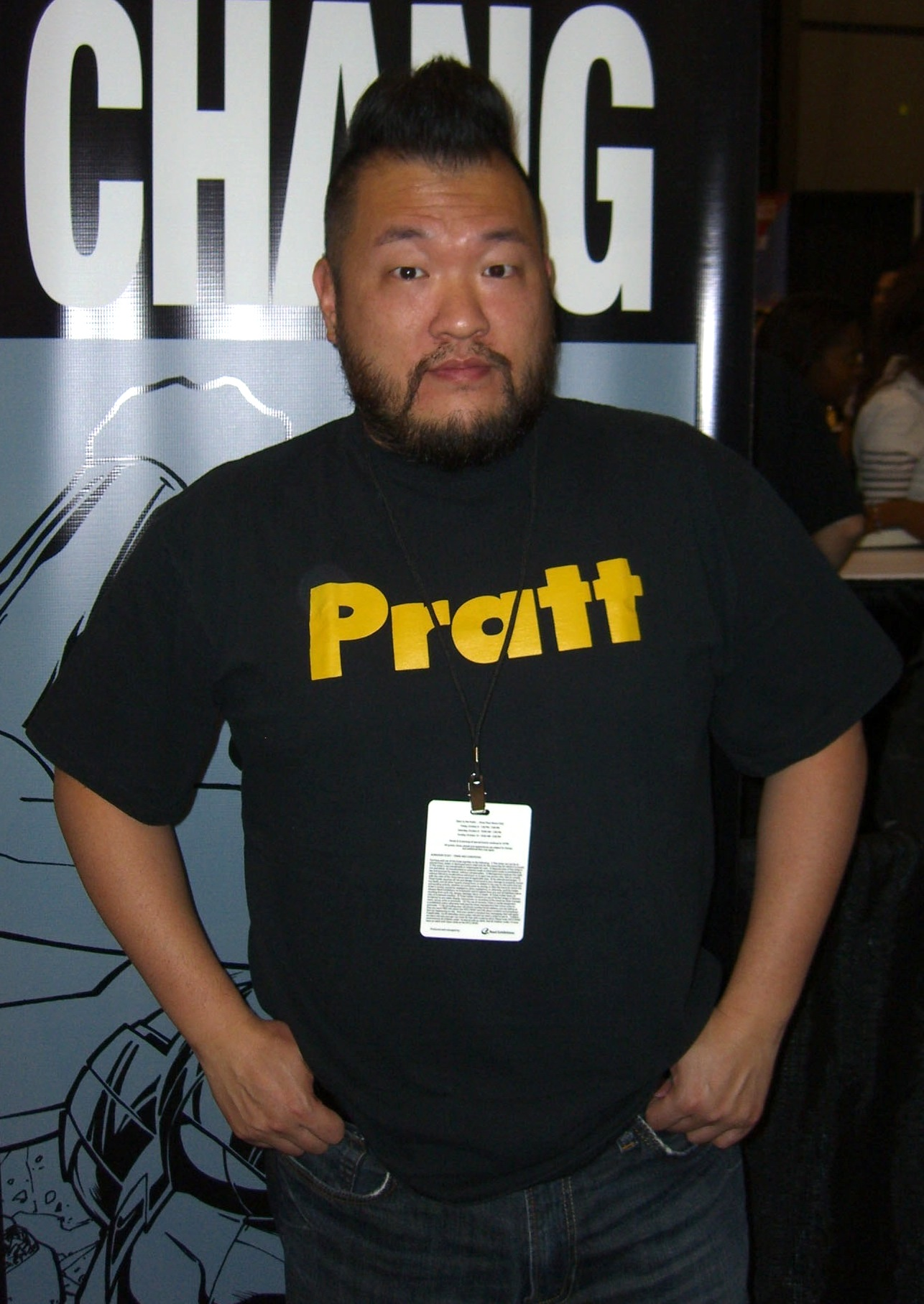
- Chang at the New York Comic Con; October 9, 2010
- Born: 1972 (age 53–54) Montreal, Quebec, Canada
- Area: Penciller

Bernard Chang (born 1972) is a Canadian-American artist and designer known for his work in the comic book industry and entertainment design.

== Career ==
Born in Montreal, Quebec, Chang started drawing comics professionally in 1992 while attending Pratt Institute in Brooklyn, New York on a full scholarship for architecture. Within his first year, he was voted onto the Wizard magazine Top Ten Artists list for his work on The Second Life of Dr. Mirage for Valiant Comics, and was nominated for the Russ Manning Award for Best Newcomer. After four years at Valiant, Bernard would go on to illustrate books for Marvel Comics and DC Comics, including X-Men, New Mutants, Cable, Deadpool, Superman, Supergirl, and Wonder Woman. Chang also drew DC Universe Presents: Deadman, part of the new DC 52 relaunch.

The Second Life of Doctor Mirage #1 by Valiant Comics (1993)

From 1997 to 2001, Chang was a "blue sky" concept designer for Walt Disney Imagineering. His projects included: Pirates of the Caribbean: Battle for Buccaneer Gold (DisneyQuest); 100 Years of Magic Celebration (Disney-MGM Studios); Animation Pavilion (Disney California Adventure Park); and the Millennium Village (Epcot) - all of which won the Themed Entertainment Association's THEA Award for Best New Attractions. Since, he has continued to work on many projects, including creative charettes for the Valley Forge Museum, the Fort Worth Museum of Science and History, and the San Pedro Waterfront Redevelopment Project.

In March 2005, Scholastic Press and Blue Sky Press published The Black Belt Club #1: Seven Wheels of Power, with text by Dawn Barnes and illustrations by Chang. There have been two additional books under the series: The Black Belt Club #2: Nightmare on the Mountain of Fear (2006); and The Black Belt Club #3: Beware of the Haunted Eye (2007).

Chang also has a long collaboration with New York Times best-selling author, Neil Strauss, providing illustrations for most of his books: The Game: Penetrating the Secret Society of Pickup Artists' (2005); The Rules of the Game (2007); Emergency: This Book Will Save Your Life (2009); Jenna Jameson's autobiography, How to Make Love Like a Porn Star: A Cautionary Tale (2004); Everyone Loves You When You're Dead: Journeys Into Fame and Madness (2011); and, most recently, The Truth: An Uncomfortable Book About Relationships (2015). Strauss and Chang also collaborated on ReganBooks/HarperCollins' first graphic novel How to Make Money Like a Porn Star, which was released in 2006.

Chang designed and illustrated the album cover and cd booklet for Fantasy Ride (2009), the third studio album of musician, Ciara, 2008's Billboard Woman of the Year. The comic book featured the singer's alter ego, Super C.

== Selected works ==
=== DC Comics ===
- Batman Beyond vol. 5 #1-6, 8-11, 13-15 (2015-2016)
- Batman Beyond vol. 6 #1-3, 5-11 (artist), #13 (writer/artist) (2016-2017)
- DC Festival of Heroes: The Asian Superhero Celebration #1 ("The Monkey Prince Hates Superheroes") (2021)
- DC Universe Presents #1-5 (Deadman), #9-11 (Vandal Savage) (2011-2012)
- Demon Knights #0, 8, 13-19 (2012-2013)
- Green Lantern Corps vol. 3 #21-24, 26-29, 31-40 (2013-2015)
- Green Lantern: Emerald Warriors #11 (2011)
- Monkey Prince #0-12 (2021-2023)
- Nightwing vol. 4 #35-36, 38, 40-41 (2018)
- Supergirl vol. 5 #57, 60-64 (2010-2011)
- Superman #695-700 (2010)
- Superman Plus the Legion of Super Heroes #1 (1997)
- Teen Titans vol. 6 #20-24, 26-32, 34-38 (2018-2020)
- Wonder Woman vol. 3 #18-19, 24-25, 31, 37 (2008-2009)

=== Marvel Comics ===
- Cable #36, 74, 76-77 (1996-2000)
- Daredevil/Deadpool Annual 1997 (1997)
- Iron Man: The End #1 (2009)
- New Mutants: Truth or Death #1-3 (1997-1998)
- X-Men vol. 2 #58 (1996)

=== Valiant Comics ===
- Archer and Armstrong #9 (1993)
- The Chaos Effect: Alpha and Omega (1994)
- Deathmate: Green and Yellow (1993)
- H.A.R.D. Corps #5 (1993)
- The Second Life of Doctor Mirage #1-7, 9-13 (1993-1994)
- Sliders: Ultimatum #1-2 (1996)
- Turok, Dinosaur Hunter #2-3 (1993)
- The Visitor #1-5, 8, 13 (1995)
- X-O Manowar #60-61 (1996)
