= Manosphere =

Collection of masculist and misogynistic websites and forums

The manosphere is a varied collection of websites, blogs, and online forums promoting masculinity, misogyny, and opposition to feminism. Communities within the manosphere include men's rights activists (MRAs), incels (involuntary celibates), Men Going Their Own Way (MGTOW), pick-up artists (PUA), and fathers' rights groups. While the specifics of each group's beliefs sometimes conflict, they are generally united in the belief that society is biased against men due to the influence of feminism, and that feminists promote misandry. Acceptance of these ideas is described as "taking the red pill", a metaphor borrowed from the film The Matrix.

The manosphere overlaps with the far-right and alt-right communities. It has also been associated with online harassment and has been implicated in radicalizing men into misogynist beliefs and the glorification of violence against women. Some sources have associated manosphere-based radicalization with mass shootings motivated by misogyny. The manosphere received significant media coverage following the 2014 Isla Vista killings in California, the 2015 Umpqua Community College shooting in Oregon, and the 2018 Toronto van attack, as well as the online harassment campaign against women in the video game industry known as GamerGate.

Notable figures within the manosphere are authors Neil Strauss and Rollo Tomassi; Tomassi in particular is frequently characterized as the "godfather of the Manosphere". Strauss's 2005 book The Game and Tomassi's 2013 The Rational Male are considered keystone works of the manosphere space. Other prominent figures within the manosphere include various social media influencers such as Andrew Tate, Hamza Ahmed, Wheat Waffles, Clavicular, Myron Gaines and Jordan Peterson.

== History ==
The roots of the manosphere lie in the men's liberation movement of the 1970s and 1980s, which began as a critique of the limiting nature of traditional male gender roles. However, in the 1970s, the nascent men's rights movement began to attribute men's problems to feminism and female empowerment. Media scholar Debbie Ging posits that the growth of the World Wide Web has enabled the spread of "virulent" anti-feminism, misogyny, and associated violent rhetoric.

Recent research traces the manosphere's modern incarnation to early online men's-rights discussion forums and pick-up-artist communities that emerged in the late 1990s and early 2000s. Its ideological roots reach further back to twentieth-century activist organizations that claimed men were disadvantaged in divorce and custody proceedings. Over time, these loosely connected spaces coalesced into a cohesive ecosystem united by shared frustration over perceived injustices against men, a development amplified by social networks and online forums. Scholars note that high-profile figures—through blogs, YouTube channels, and other web platforms—popularized these ideas, engaged followers, and helped establish the ideological framework that now shapes the broader community.

Building upon these early foundations, the manosphere gained momentum in the early 2010s as online influencers and content creators promoted "red pill" philosophies—ideas that claim society is systematically biased against men—through viral videos, podcasts, and debates. Media reports and academic studies have observed that many of these influencers intentionally use controversy and confrontational language to expand their audiences and generate revenue. A January 2020 study found that such tactics have spread misogynistic speech beyond fringe websites, fueling widespread online hate campaigns and, in some cases, contributing to violence against women.

The term "manosphere", a play on the word "blogosphere", is believed to have first appeared on Blogspot in 2009. It was subsequently popularized by Ian Ironwood, a pornography marketer who collected a variety of blogs and forums in book form as The Manosphere: A New Hope For Masculinity. The term entered the popular lexicon when news media began to use it in stories about men who had committed acts of misogynist violence, sexual assault, and online harassment.

Journalist Emma A. Jane identifies the late 2000s–early 2010s as a "tipping point" when manosphere communities moved from the fringes of the Internet towards the mainstream. She hypothesizes this was related to the advent of Web 2.0 and the rise of social media, in combination with ongoing systemic misogyny within a patriarchal culture. Jane writes that the manosphere was well established by the time of the GamerGate controversy in 2014, and misogynistic language such as graphic rape threats against women had entered mainstream discourse, being deployed by men not necessarily identified with any specific manosphere group.

Following Donald Trump's victory in the 2024 United States presidential election, the Associated Press reported that an "emboldened" manosphere used Trump's win "to justify and amplify misogynistic derision and threats online" and that it was no longer an online-only phenomenon. It highlighted the phrase "Your body, my choice" being used against women coined by Nick Fuentes, along with the phrases "Get back in the kitchen" and "Repeal the 19th" receiving millions of views on X. It also reported that the phrases had moved offline, "with boys chanting ['Your body, my choice'] in middle schools or men directing it at women on college campuses", and highlighted a man holding a sign that read "Women Are Property" at Texas State University.

== Themes and ideology ==
The manosphere is a varied group of online communities that includes men's-rights activists (MRAs), incels (involuntary celibates), Men Going Their Own Way (MGTOW), pick-up artists (PUAs), and fathers' rights groups. Some groups within the manosphere have adversarial relationships with one another. Groups such as MRAs and PUAs tend to exaggerate their differences with one another, despite their philosophies being almost identical.

While the specifics of each group's beliefs sometimes conflict, the general ideology of manosphere groups centers on the promotion of masculinity, antifeminism, and misogyny. In particular, feminists are portrayed as ignoring male victims of sexual assault and encouraging false rape accusations against men. Journalist Caitlin Dewey argues that the main tenets of the manosphere can be reduced to (1) the corruption of modern society by feminism, in violation of inherent sex differences between men and women; and (2) the ability of men to save society or achieve sexual prowess by adopting a hyper-masculine role and forcing women to submit to them.

A central theme permeating the manosphere is that of misandry (hatred of men). Disparate groups within the manosphere are united by the central belief that feminism dominates contemporary society, and that men are the victims of a culture that has been corrupted by feminine values and biased against men.

=== Jargon ===
The manosphere has its own distinct jargon. A central tenet of the manosphere is the concept of the red pill, a metaphor borrowed from the film The Matrix. It concerns awakening men to the supposed reality that men are the oppressed gender in a society dominated by feminism. Manospherians believe that feminists and political correctness obscure this reality, and that men are victims who must fight to protect themselves. Accepting the manosphere's ideology is equated with "taking the red pill" (sometimes abbreviated TRP), and those who do not are seen as "blue pilled" or as having "taken the blue pill". Such terminology originated on the antifeminist subreddit /r/TheRedPill and was later taken up by other groups within the manosphere, including pickup artists and men's rights activists. Author Donna Zuckerberg writes, "The Red Pill represents a new phase in online misogyny. Its members not only mock and belittle women; they also believe that in our society, men are oppressed by women."

Men are commonly divided into "alpha" and "beta" males within an evolutionary-psychology framework, where "alphas" are seen as sexually dominant and attractive to women, who are hardwired to want sex with alphas but will pair with "beta" males for financial benefits. Among MRAs and PUAs this argument is known as "alpha fux beta bux". On the Red Pill subreddit, "swallowing the red pill" means understanding that women's innate biological nature is "manipulative, attention-seeking, inconsistent, emotional, and hypergamous [i.e. seeking a high-status partner]"; participants seek to use this knowledge to manipulate and dominate women in the hope of obtaining sex with few emotional demands.

The idea of misandry (hatred of or prejudice against men) is commonly invoked, both as an equivalent to misogyny and a way to deny the existence of institutionalized sexism. However, there is little evidence to show that misandry is an issue affecting men's lives. For instance, both male and female homicide victims are more likely to have been killed by a man, rather than by a woman. Although feminism is described within the manosphere as a misandrist movement, there are no significant feminist groups dedicated to espousing hatred of men or encouraging female violence against men.

=== Associated movements ===
The manosphere overlaps with white-supremacist and far-right ideologies, including the neoreactionary, white-nationalist alt-right movement. Many alt-right members are either pick-up artists or MGTOW, and "the policing of white female sexuality is a major concern" of the alt-right, according to Zuckerberg. The severity of the antifeminism espoused within these communities varies, with some espousing fairly mild sexism and others glorifying extreme misogyny. Racism and xenophobia are also common among groups in the manosphere, and perceived threats against Western civilization are a popular topic. Tracie Farrell of Open University and colleagues write that in addition to the "angry white men" associated with the alt-right, the manosphere also contains "men of colour, struggling with systemic racism that extends to beauty ideals and status".

=== Radicalization and violence ===
The manosphere has been associated with online harassment, radicalizing men into misogynist beliefs and the glorification of violence against women. Some sources have associated manosphere-based radicalization with mass shootings motivated by misogyny. Robin Mamié of École Polytechnique Fédérale de Lausanne and colleagues associate radicalization into far-right ideologies via the manosphere with the idea of the alt-right pipeline.

== Websites and influencers ==
The manosphere comprises various websites, blogs, and online forums. Noted sites include /r/TheRedPill, Return of Kings, and A Voice for Men, as well as (the now-defunct) PUAHate and SlutHate.

Reddit has been a popular gathering place for manosphere supporters, and several forums on the site are geared toward its ideas. However, in the late 2010s and 2020s Reddit began to take steps to discourage more extreme manosphere subreddits. Some were banned, such as /r/incels (banned in 2017), its successor /r/braincels (banned in 2018), and /r/MGTOW (banned in August 2021); other subreddits such as /r/TheRedPill have been "quarantined", meaning that a warning is displayed to users about the content of the subreddit and users must sign in before they're allowed to enter. As a result, some of these communities have found new homes on websites that are more welcoming of extreme content, such as Gab.

Mainstay figures within the manosphere include author Neil Strauss of the book The Game, and author Rollo Tomassi of book The Rational Male. These books are considered keystone works in the manosphere space, laying ideological groundwork. Rollo Tomassi has been characterized as the "godfather of the Manosphere". Influencer Andrew Tate is one of the most popular figures in the manosphere, considered a poster boy of the space.

Prominent influencers of the black pill ideology include YouTuber FaceandLMS, influencer Wheat Waffles, and influencer Clavicular. Wheat Waffles authored The Blackpill Bible.

Other popular figures within the manosphere include various social media influencers such as Myron Gaines, Hamza Ahmed, Jordan Peterson, and Adin Ross. By 2026, Andrew Kibe and El Temach have been described as the most influential manosphere figures in Africa and Latin America respectively.

There are also female influencers adjacent to the manosphere space. An example is prominent anti-feminist influencer Hannah Pearl Davis, who has drawn comparisons to Andrew Tate.

== Public perception ==
The manosphere has received significant coverage in the media from its association with high-profile violent attacks including the 2014 Isla Vista killings in California, the 2015 Umpqua Community College shooting in Oregon, and the 2018 Toronto van attack, as well as the online harassment campaign against women in the video game industry that came to be known as GamerGate. Following the Isla Vista shooting, the killer Elliot Rodger was found to have been an active participant on the PUAHate forum.

Arthur Goldwag described the manosphere in the Spring 2012 edition of the Southern Poverty Law Center's Intelligence Report as an "underworld of misogynists, woman-haters whose fury goes well beyond criticism of the family court system, domestic violence laws, and false rape accusations... [who are] devoted to attacking virtually all women (or, at least, Westernized ones)." In 2018, the SPLC added male supremacy as a category they track on their list of hate groups.

The British anti-extremism group Hope not Hate included the manosphere in its 2019 State of Hate report.

Following the British television show Adolescence, the Women and Equalities Committee launched an inquiry into Misogyny: the Manosphere and online content, examining the manosphere's impact and what can be done to address it. The 2025 BBC documentary Men of the Manosphere follows James Blake as he enters the virtual world of the manosphere.

== See also ==
- Bro culture – Subculture of young men
- Femosphere – Collection of feminist online communities
- Femicide – Murder of women or girls because of their gender
- Hegemonic masculinity – Concept in gender studies
- Hannah Pearl Davis – American social media personality (born 1996)
- Identity politics – Politics based on one's identity
- Jesse Lee Peterson – American radio and TV host and political commentator (born 1949)
- Kevin Samuels – American internet personality (1965–2022)
- Lad culture – British and Irish subculture
- Louis Theroux: Inside the Manosphere – 2026 documentary film by Adrian Choa
- Masculism – Advocacy for the rights and interests of males
- Nick Adams – Australian-American political commentator and author (born 1984)
- Petro-masculinity – Variety of masculinity related to fossil fuels
- The Red Pill – 2016 film by Cassie Jaye
- Simping – Slang for sycophancy
- Toxic masculinity – Social sciences concept
