= Fresh and Fit Podcast =

American manosphere podcast

Fresh and Fit
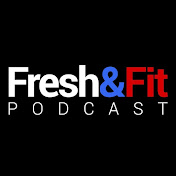
- Genre: Talk; dating; finances; current events
- Format: Audio; video
- Country of origin: United States
- Language: English

Cast and voices
- Hosted by: Amrou Fudl; Walter Weekes

Production
- Production: Aaron Chris Pogson
- Length: 2–5 hours

Publication
- Original release: October 26, 2020
- Provider: YouTube (2020–present); Twitch (2021–2024); Spotify (2022–present); Rumble (2022–present); Kick (2025–present)

Related
- Website: freshandfitmiami.com (archived)

YouTube information
- Channel: Fresh and Fit Podcast
- Years active: 2020–present
- Subscribers: 1.59 million
- Views: 296 million
- Last updated: March 7, 2026

The Fresh and Fit Podcast is a show hosted by Sudanese-American blogger Amrou Fudl (Arabic: عمرو فضل; born February 1, 1990), known online by the pseudonym Myron Gaines, and Barbadian-American Walter Weekes (born October 2, 1992), who goes by the moniker "FreshPrinceCEO". Launched on October 26, 2020, the podcast discusses topics such as personal finance, fitness, relationships, politics, and gender dynamics.

Originally positioned within the manosphere as a dating and self-improvement podcast, Fresh and Fit has been the subject of sustained and escalating criticism from journalists, civil rights organisations, and platform enforcement bodies. Researchers and watchdog groups have documented a trajectory from male chauvinist content toward explicit antisemitism, Holocaust denial, and Nazi apologetics, arguing that the podcast has functioned as a bridge between mainstream manosphere audiences and openly white nationalist and far-right spaces. The hosts' views on women and relationships have been described as misogynistic.

The hosts and guests have repeatedly expressed antisemitic views, engaged in Holocaust denial and Nazi apologetics — including on-air statements describing Adolf Hitler as a "revolutionary leader" and justifying the Holocaust — and made disparaging remarks about black women. The Southern Poverty Law Center, Media Matters for America, the Anti-Defamation League, and the Global Project Against Hate and Extremism have all documented the podcast's antisemitic content and its role in normalizing extremist rhetoric to large mainstream audiences.

In 2023, Fresh and Fit was demonetized on YouTube for "repeated violations of [its] policies, including [its] Advertiser-Friendly Guidelines and Community Guidelines".

== Format ==
The podcast streams multiple times weekly with recurring themed episodes. "Money Monday" episodes focus on finance, investing and real estate, while "Fitness/Call-In Friday" episodes feature viewer interaction through calls and live chat.

== Background and history ==
The Fresh and Fit Podcast began on October 26, 2020, as part of the manosphere and the men's rights movement. It was founded by Myron Gaines, author of Why Women Deserve Less, and Walter Weekes. Gaines left his job of six years as a special tactical unit agent with the Department of Homeland Security on December 5, 2020, to work full time on the podcast.

Lisa Sugiura, author of The Incel Rebellion: The Rise of the Manosphere and the Virtual War Against Women, has suggested that the hosts of Fresh and Fit, along with other manosphere figures such as Andrew Tate, are compelling to viewers because they are seen as "anti-mainstream": "But . . . the contradiction is that [they are] very much part of the mainstream and validating the usual tropes about gender and violence against women." According to Aavad Hashmi, a Harvard University scholar of Islamic studies, Myron Gaines belongs to a group of Muslim male influencers known as akh right bros, who position themselves against Western values and promote a version of Islam characterized by misogyny.

=== Escalation and ideological trajectory ===
Researchers and journalists have described Fresh and Fit as shifting over time from content focused primarily on dating advice, personal finance, and gender dynamics toward increasingly controversial political and antisemitic commentary. Critics and watchdog organisations have argued that from approximately 2022 onward, the podcast increasingly featured antisemitic rhetoric, Holocaust denial, and collaborations with far-right figures including Nick Fuentes.

The Southern Poverty Law Center characterised this shift as part of a broader trend involving some manosphere influencers moving toward far-right political content. Media Matters for America identified the podcast's 2023 appearances featuring Fuentes as a significant development in the show's evolution, noting that Fuentes had previously been banned from major platforms for Holocaust denial and white nationalist advocacy.

In March 2022, the podcast received a weeklong ban on YouTube for hate speech. The hosts stated that the suspension resulted from coordinated reporting campaigns targeting the channel.

On August 18, 2023, Fresh and Fit was demonetized on YouTube and removed from the YouTube Partner Program for repeated policy violations, according to a YouTube spokesperson. Gaines stated that the podcast hosted "uncomfortable conversations about uncomfortable topics" and attributed the demonetization to the nature of the show's content. Following the demonetization, the podcast expanded its presence on Rumble.

== Opinions ==
=== Relation to women ===
In a 2020 TikTok video, Gaines stated that "when a girl tells you: 'Hey, let's raincheck or reschedule,' you [should] simply respond, 'Hey, that's cool, but I'm not really a fan of flaky girls", because, according to him, "if you take her on a date after she did some BS like that, she's gonna think it's OK. Don't reinforce bad behavior with positive treatment." The video sparked criticism and mild support from social media users. The podcast's TikTok account, which had over 50,000 followers at the time, was also deleted from the platform following the publication of Gaines' video.

Both men have stated that they do not date "ghetto black women and Shaniquas". In one instance, Gaines said that it is "just a preference [they] have to not date black women." Gaines was born in Brooklyn, New York City and is of Sudanese descent while Weekes was born in Barbados. Gaines identifies as a Muslim.

Fresh and Fit has hosted Andrew Tate on its livestreams multiple times. Following the criminal investigations of Tate, the hosts have argued for his innocence.

In his book Why Women Deserve Less (2023), Gaines writes: "The relationship between most men and women throughout all of history has been transactional. It has been prostitution. All men are Johns. All women are whores." During his speech at the University of South Carolina, Gaines argued women are manipulative, biologically inferior and not punished enough by society.

=== Antisemitism, Holocaust denial, and Nazi apologetics ===
==== Overview and documented pattern ====
Media Matters for America, the Southern Poverty Law Center, and the Global Project Against Hate and Extremism have each independently documented a sustained and escalating pattern of antisemitic content on Fresh and Fit, spanning from 2023 through at least late 2025. The content documented by these organisations includes: on-air Holocaust denial; explicit praise of Adolf Hitler by hosts and guests; jokes and skits premised on antisemitic ethnic stereotypes; the "Jewish Question" framing drawn from Nazi ideology; denial of atrocities committed during the October 7 attacks; and the production and sale of merchandise referencing the murder of Jewish people in Nazi concentration camps. Critics have argued that the significance of this content is not only its explicit character but its potential reach: at the time the most serious antisemitic content aired, the podcast retained an audience of over one million YouTube subscribers who had originally engaged with the channel through dating and self-improvement programming.

Gaines has listed Jews as among the groups he considers to have had the "most problematic influence" in the United States, alongside Indian Americans and Chinese Americans.

==== Nick Fuentes collaborations and the "Jewish Question" ====
Fresh and Fit has repeatedly collaborated with Nick Fuentes, a white nationalist commentator and leader of the America First or "groyper" movement, who had previously been banned from YouTube, Twitter, and other major platforms for Holocaust denial and white nationalist advocacy.

In July 2023, Fresh and Fit hosted Fuentes across multiple episodes. During one episode, Gaines stated: "we're the biggest platform that's talking about the JQ. No one else will do it." The term "JQ," shorthand for the "Jewish Question," has historical associations with antisemitic ideology and is used in contemporary far-right discourse.

In another episode featuring Fuentes, Gaines dressed as a Hasidic Jew on camera and said, "Anyone need a loan – high interest rates, I'll hook y'all up." Media Matters for America criticised the Fuentes collaborations as contributing to the spread of Holocaust denial content to broader online audiences.

Fuentes later appeared alongside Gaines and others in a discussion following the NELK Boys' interview with Israeli Prime Minister Benjamin Netanyahu in July 2025, which The Times of Israel characterised as involving influencers associated with antisemitic commentary.

==== Holocaust denial as debate content ====
Watchdog organisations including Media Matters for America and the Southern Poverty Law Center have criticised Fresh and Fit for hosting discussions featuring Holocaust denial and antisemitic rhetoric.

In July 2025, an episode of the podcast featured a guest who attempted to justify the Holocaust by claiming that Jews "were up to something, so the Germans wanted to take them out," and separately blamed Jews for societal decline in the United States. Another guest described Hitler as "a man trying to save the world," while other participants made statements calling for violence against Jewish people.

Rumble later removed the episode for violating its content standards.

During the same period, Gaines denied that mass rapes took place during the October 7 attacks and claimed that Hamas' primary objective in the invasion was to seize hostages for use in prisoner exchanges rather than to carry out mass killings.

==== Gaines' personal Hitler praise and Nazi imagery (2025) ====
In October 2025, Gaines publicly and personally defended a leaked GOP group chat containing antisemitic messages that praised Adolf Hitler, posting on social media: "Yeah, we like Hitler. No one gives a fuck what you woke jews think anymore." He subsequently described Hitler as "a revolutionary leader" who had saved Germany. Gaines also posted an image of himself digitally superimposed on a photograph of Hitler, writing "Hitler was a real nigga and no one gives a fuck what stupid outlets you fruit loops say." The Jewish Telegraphic Agency reported on the posts in the context of broader coverage of the leaked group chat, which had prompted public statements from Congressional leadership.

Gaines subsequently drew attention for selling and wearing merchandise based on an antisemitic Groyper meme mocking Holocaust victims, bearing the phrase "Let Em Cook" above a Cookie Monster figure with an oven filled with cookies — imagery widely understood as a reference to the Nazi gas chambers and crematoria used during the Holocaust. The GPHE cited the merchandise as part of a documented pattern of Gaines using commercial products to propagate antisemitic content across Instagram and other platforms.

== Platform actions and deplatforming ==
Fresh and Fit has been subject to a series of platform enforcement actions escalating in severity over its operational history.

In March 2022, YouTube issued a weeklong ban on the podcast for hate speech, which the hosts characterised as a politically motivated "targeted attack." In August 2023, YouTube permanently demonetized the channel and removed it from the YouTube Partner Program for repeated policy violations, citing both its Advertiser-Friendly Guidelines and Community Guidelines. Following demonetization, the hosts migrated significant operations to Rumble, which markets itself as a free-speech video platform and had become a common destination for creators demonetized or removed by YouTube. However, in July 2025, Rumble itself deleted at least one Fresh and Fit episode — the one in which guests justified the Holocaust and praised Hitler — for violating its own content standards, a decision noted by commentators given Rumble's generally permissive editorial stance.

== Critical reception and scholarly analysis ==
=== Manosphere-to-extremism pipeline ===
A central criticism advanced by researchers and journalists covering Fresh and Fit is that the podcast has served as a significant conduit between the mainstream manosphere — an online ecosystem centred on dating advice, masculinity, and anti-feminist rhetoric — and openly white nationalist and antisemitic far-right spaces. This function is documented most clearly in the Fuentes collaborations of 2023, which brought a deplatformed white nationalist to an audience exceeding one million people who had engaged with the channel through lifestyle content, without critical framing or contextualisation of Fuentes' documented views and history.

The SPLC argued in its 2025 report that Gaines and Fresh and Fit represent a case study in how manosphere content ecosystems can function as entry points into more extreme ideological territory, describing a pathway in which audiences drawn to relationship and financial advice content are progressively introduced to racially charged framings of social problems, then to antisemitic conspiracy theories, and eventually to Holocaust denial and explicit Nazi apologetics. The SPLC specifically highlighted Gaines' appearances at college campuses as an extension of this dynamic into physical spaces, describing his campus programming as bringing "racism, antisemitism and misogyny" to student audiences.

Researchers have noted that manosphere audiences, particularly young men seeking dating, fitness, and self-improvement content, overlap significantly with the recruitment demographics targeted by far-right online movements and extremist communities. The Global Project Against Hate and Extremism identified Gaines as a prominent node in what it described as an "antisemitism economy" operating across Instagram and other major social platforms, in which antisemitic content is packaged for mainstream audiences and monetised through merchandise, subscriptions, and platform revenue.

=== Responses from advocacy groups and media ===
Multiple advocacy organisations and media outlets have published investigations or reports concerning antisemitic rhetoric and Holocaust denial associated with Fresh and Fit. Media Matters for America published reports on the podcast's collaborations with Nick Fuentes and episodes featuring Holocaust denial rhetoric. The Southern Poverty Law Center published a 2025 Hatewatch report concerning Gaines' campus appearances and online activity. The Jewish Telegraphic Agency and The Times of Israel reported on Gaines' public praise of Adolf Hitler and related controversies involving antisemitic commentary. The Global Project Against Hate and Extremism included Gaines in a report examining what it described as an "antisemitism economy" operating across social media platforms. The July 2025 episode featuring Holocaust justification and praise of Hitler was also covered by The Jewish Chronicle and Jewish News (UK).

== See also ==
- Men's rights movement
- Pickup artist
- Red pill movement
- Nick Fuentes
- Groyper movement
- Manosphere
- Holocaust denial
