= Langkap (state constituency) =

Political subdivision in Malaysia

Langkap (N07)
Terengganu constituency

State constituency
- Legislature: Terengganu State Legislative Assembly
MLA
Azmi Maarof
PN
- Constituency created: 1959
- First contested: 1959
- Last contested: 2023

Demographics
- Electors (2023): 22,439

N07 Langkap within Terengganu, as used for the 2023 state election

Langkap is a state constituency in Terengganu, Malaysia, that has been represented in the Terengganu State Legislative Assembly.

The state constituency was first contested in 1959 and is mandated to return a single Assemblyman to the Terengganu State Legislative Assembly under the first-past-the-post voting system.

== Demographics ==
Ethnic breakdown of Langkap's electorate as of 2018
1. Malay (99.7%)
2. Other ethnicities (0.22%)
3. Chinese (0.05%)
4. Indian (0.03%)

== History ==
=== Polling districts ===
According to the gazette issued on 30 March 2018, the Langkap constituency has a total of 13 polling districts.

State Constituency	Polling Districts	Code	Location
Langkap (N07)	Kampung Rahmat	034/07/01	SK Kampung Rahmat
Langkap (N07)	Gong Terap	034/07/02	SK Chalok
Langkap (N07)	Bukit Putera	034/07/03	SK Bukit Putera
Langkap (N07)	Chalok Barat	034/07/04	SK (FELDA) Chalok Barat
Langkap (N07)	Langkap	034/07/05	SK Langkap
Langkap (N07)	Pengkalan Merbau	034/07/06	SK Sungai Tong
Langkap (N07)	Sungai Bari	034/07/07	SK Batu 29
Langkap (N07)	Jelapang	034/07/08	SK Jelapang
Langkap (N07)	Sungai Tong	034/07/09	SMK Sungai Tong
Langkap (N07)	Pelung	034/07/10	SK Pelong
Langkap (N07)	Kampung Bukit	034/07/11	SK Kampung Bukit
Langkap (N07)	Bukit Munduk	034/07/12	SK Bukit Mundok
Langkap (N07)	Chalok Kedai	034/07/13	SMK Chalok

=== Representation history ===
Members of the Legislative Assembly for Langkap
Assembly	No	Years	Member	Party
Constituency created
1st	N09	1959–1964	Ismail Abbas	Negara
2nd	N09	1964–1969	Abdul Rahman Long	Alliance (UMNO)
		1969–1971	Assembly dissolved	
3rd	N09	1971–1973	Abdul Rahman Long	Alliance (UMNO)
3rd	N09	1973-1974	Abdul Rahman Long	BN (UMNO)
4th	N06	1974–1978	Salleh Mohamed	BN (UMNO)
5th	N06	1978–1982	Salleh Mohamed	BN (UMNO)
6th	N06	1982–1986	Salleh Mohamed	BN (UMNO)
7th	N07	1986–1990	Mamat Ghazalee Abdul Rahman	BN (UMNO)
8th	N07	1990–1995	Mamat Ghazalee Abdul Rahman	BN (UMNO)
9th	N07	1995–1999	Mamat Ghazalee Abdul Rahman	BN (UMNO)
10th	N07	1999–2004	Mohamad Hitam	PAS
11th	N07	2004–2008	Asha'ari Idris	BN (UMNO)
12th	N07	2008–2013	Asha'ari Idris	BN (UMNO)
13th	N07	2013–2018	Sabri Mohd Noor	BN (UMNO)
14th	N07	2018–2023	Sabri Mohd Noor	BN (UMNO)
15th	N07	2023–present	Azmi Maarof	PN (PAS)

== Election results ==
Terengganu state election, 2023
Party	Candidate	Votes	%	∆%
PAS	Azmi Maarof	9,553	58.35	▲21.65
BN	Sabri Mohd Noor	6,819	41.65	▼17.80
Total valid votes		16,372	100.00	
Total rejected ballots		96		
Unreturned ballots		6		
Turnout		16,474	73.42	▼11.37
Registered electors		22,439		
Majority		2,734	16.70	▼6.05
PAS gain from BN		Swing		?

Terengganu state election, 2018
Party	Candidate	Votes	%	∆%
BN	Sabri Mohd Noor	9,007	59.45	▼1.48
PAS	Azmi Maarof	5,561	36.70	▼2.37
PKR	Mustaffa Abdullah	583	3.85	▲3.85
Total valid votes		15,151	100.00	
Total rejected ballots		243		
Unreturned ballots		119		
Turnout		15,513	84.79	▼2.34
Registered electors		18,296		
Majority		3,446	22.74	▲0.89
BN hold		Swing		

Terengganu state election, 2013
Party	Candidate	Votes	%	∆%
BN	Sabri Mohd Noor	8,425	60.93	▼0.87
PAS	Hassan Karim	5,403	39.07	▲0.87
Total valid votes		13,828	100.00	
Total rejected ballots		190		
Unreturned ballots		31		
Turnout		14,049	87.13	▲2.58
Registered electors		16,124		
Majority		3,022	21.85	▼1.74
BN hold		Swing		

Terengganu state election, 2008
Party	Candidate	Votes	%	∆%
BN	Asha'ari Idris	6,682	61.80	▲0.67
PAS	Tengku Ahmad Tengku Hussain	4,131	38.20	▼0.67
Total valid votes		10,813	100.00	
Total rejected ballots		219		
Unreturned ballots		16		
Turnout		11,048	84.56	▼3.46
Registered electors		13,066		
Majority		2,551	23.59	▲1.34
BN hold		Swing		

Terengganu state election, 2004
Party	Candidate	Votes	%	∆%
BN	Asha'ari Idris	6,021	61.13	▲12.15
PAS	Tengku Ahmad Tengku Hussain	3,829	38.87	▼12.15
Total valid votes		9,850	100.00	
Total rejected ballots		179		
Unreturned ballots		0		
Turnout		10,029	88.01	▲6.11
Registered electors		11,395		
Majority		2,192	22.25	▲20.21
BN gain from PAS		Swing		-

Terengganu state election, 1999
Party	Candidate	Votes	%	∆%
PAS	Mohamad Hitam	3,923	51.02	▲51.02
BN	Asha'ari Idris	3,766	48.98	▼17.87
Total valid votes		7,689	100.00	
Total rejected ballots		262		
Unreturned ballots		3		
Turnout		7,954	81.90	▼0.10
Registered electors		9,712		
Majority		157	2.04	▼31.66
PAS gain from BN		Swing		-

Terengganu state election, 1995
Party	Candidate	Votes	%	∆%
BN	Mamat Ghazalee Abdul Rahman	4,814	66.85	▲4.37
PAS	Alias Zainal	2,387	33.15	▲33.15
Total valid votes		7,201	100.00	
Total rejected ballots		286		
Unreturned ballots		10		
Turnout		7,497	82.00	▼2.81
Registered electors		9,143		
Majority		2,427	33.70	▲8.73
BN hold		Swing		

Terengganu state election, 1990
Party	Candidate	Votes	%	∆%
BN	Mamat Ghazalee Abdul Rahman	3,811	62.49	▼0.94
PAS	Mahmood Sulaiman	2,288	37.51	▲0.94
Total valid votes		6,099	100.00	
Total rejected ballots		191		
Unreturned ballots		0		
Turnout		6,290	84.81	▲4.63
Registered electors		7,417		
Majority		1,523	24.97	▼1.88
BN hold		Swing		

Terengganu state election, 1986
Party	Candidate	Votes	%	∆%
BN	Mamat Ghazalee Abdul Rahman	3,205	63.43	▼0.50
PAS	Tengku Ahmad Tengku Hussain	1,848	36.57	▲1.72
Total valid votes		5,053	100.00	
Total rejected ballots		199		
Unreturned ballots		0		
Turnout		5,252	80.17	▼0.52
Registered electors		6,551		
Majority		1,357	26.86	▼2.22
BN hold		Swing		

Terengganu state election, 1982
Party	Candidate	Votes	%	∆%
BN	Salleh Mohamed	4,380	63.93	▲4.03
PAS	Mahmood Sulaiman	2,388	34.86	▲17.23
Parti Sosialis Rakyat Malaysia	Daud Awang	83	1.21	▼21.26
Total valid votes		6,851	100.00	
Total rejected ballots		220		
Unreturned ballots		0		
Turnout		7,071	80.69	▲2.47
Registered electors		8,763		
Majority		1,992	29.08	▼8.36
BN hold		Swing		

Terengganu state election, 1978
Party	Candidate	Votes	%	∆%
BN	Salleh Mohamed	3,303	59.90	▼2.13
Parti Sosialis Rakyat Malaysia	Tengku Ahmad Tengku Hussain	1,239	22.47	▼15.50
PAS	Mohamad Hitam	972	17.63	▲17.63
Total valid votes		5,514	100.00	
Total rejected ballots		399		
Unreturned ballots		0		
Turnout		5,913	78.22	▲1.26
Registered electors		7,559		
Majority		2,064	37.43	▲13.37
BN hold		Swing		

Terengganu state election, 1974
Party	Candidate	Votes	%	∆%
BN	Salleh Mohamed	2,671	62.03	▲9.90
Parti Sosialis Rakyat Malaysia	Tengku Ahmad Tengku Hussain	1,635	37.97	▲37.97
Total valid votes		4,306	100.00	
Total rejected ballots		255		
Unreturned ballots		0		
Turnout		4,561	76.97	▼0.61
Registered electors		5,926		
Majority		1,036	24.06	▲19.79
BN gain from Alliance		Swing		-

Terengganu state election, 1969
Party	Candidate	Votes	%	∆%
Alliance	Abdul Rahman Long	2,651	52.13	▲0.03
PMIP	Ismail Abas	2,434	47.87	▲9.28
Total valid votes		5,085	100.00	
Total rejected ballots		436		
Unreturned ballots		0		
Turnout		5,521	77.57	▼0.97
Registered electors		7,117		
Majority		217	4.27	▼9.26
Alliance hold		Swing		

Terengganu state election, 1964
Party	Candidate	Votes	%	∆%
Alliance	Abdul Rahman Long	2,200	52.11	▲24.84
PMIP	Ismail Abas	1,629	38.58	▲14.46
National Party	Abdul Rashid Hussin	393	9.31	▼22.75
Total valid votes		4,222	100.00	
Total rejected ballots		247		
Unreturned ballots		0		
Turnout		4,469	78.54	▲9.98
Registered electors		5,690		
Majority		571	13.52	▲8.73
Alliance gain from NEG		Swing		-

Terengganu state election, 1959
Party	Candidate	Votes	%
National Party	Ismail Abas	910	32.05
Alliance	Abdul Rahman Long	774	27.26
PMIP	Ngah Awang	685	24.13
Alliance	Abdul Rashid Hussin	470	16.56
Total valid votes		2,839	100.00
Total rejected ballots		217	
Unreturned ballots		0	
Turnout		3,056	68.57
Registered electors		4,457	
Majority		136	4.79
This was a new constituency created.
