= The Truth: An Uncomfortable Book About Relationships =

2015 non-fiction book by Neil Strauss

The Truth
- Author: Neil Strauss
- Illustrator: Bernard Chang, Neil Strauss
- Cover artist: Laurie Griffin
- Language: English
- Publisher: Dey Street Books
- Publication date: October 2015
- Publication place: United States
- Media type: Print, imitation leather binding
- Pages: 448 pp.
- ISBN: 978-0-06-089876-2
- Preceded by: The Game: Penetrating the Secret Society of Pickup Artists

The Truth: An Uncomfortable Book About Relationships is an autobiographical book written by investigative reporter Neil Strauss, covering his attempts to form and maintain a long-term relationship following his years in the seduction community.

The Truth is a follow-up to Strauss's earlier The Game (2005), which chronicled his years in the seduction community. The Truth was published in a similar format to The Game, and features a contrasting white faux leather cover; it was provisionally titled Game Over.

In August 2017, Deadline reported that Stone Village Television had acquired the rights to Neil Strauss's book The Truth: An Uncomfortable Book About Relationships to develop it as a television series.The project was being developed by Scott Steindorff and Dylan Russell of Stone Village Television.

== Reception ==
Reviews were published in Grantland and The Chicago Tribune.
