= Negging =

Compliment to undermine the receiver's confidence

Negging ("to neg", meaning "negative feedback") is an act of emotional manipulation whereby a person makes a deliberate backhanded compliment or otherwise flirtatious remark to another person to undermine their confidence and attempt to engender in them a need for the manipulator's approval. The term was coined and prescribed by pickup artists.

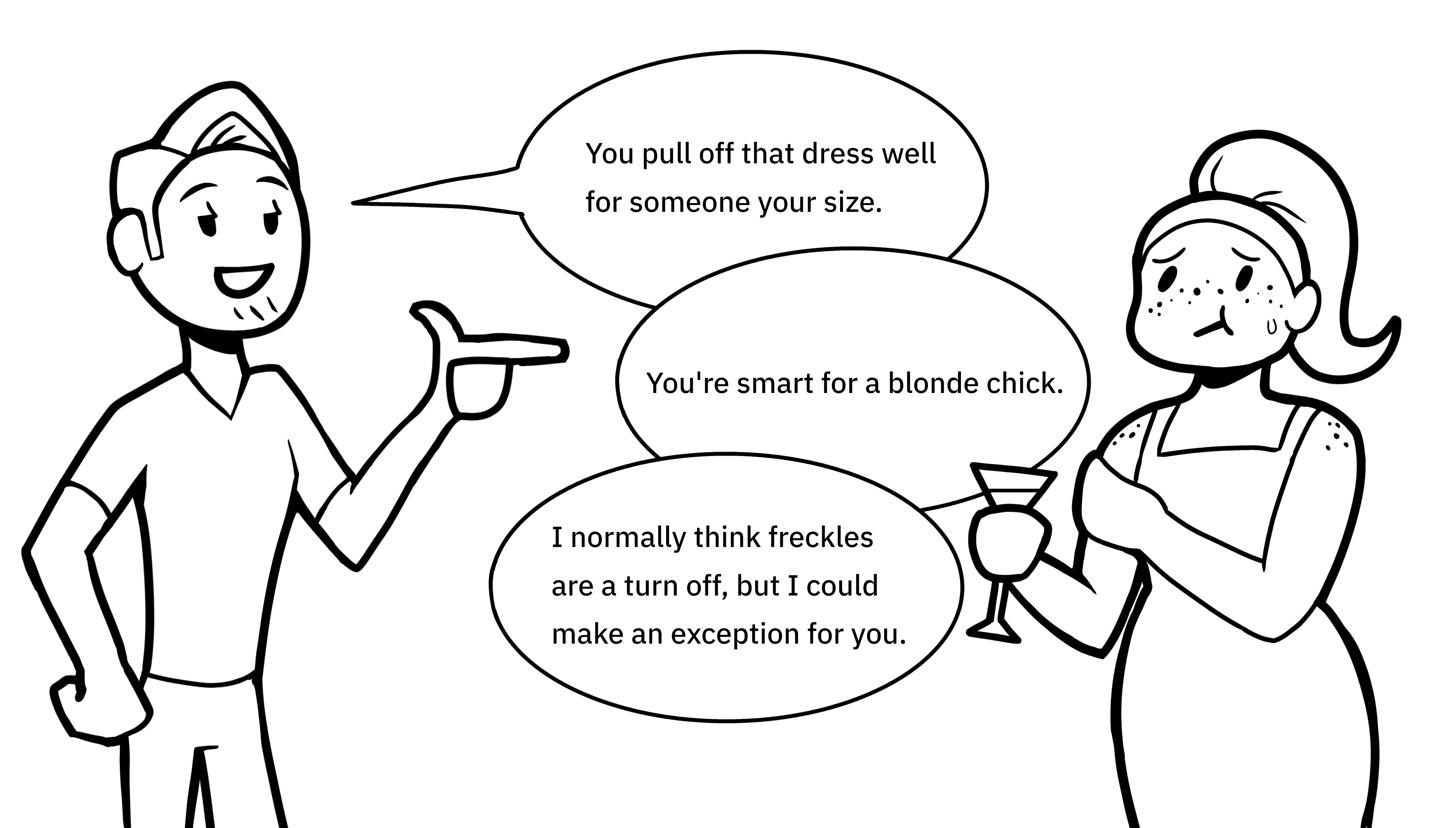
Example of negging

Negging is often viewed as a straightforward insult rather than as a pick-up line, in spite of the fact that proponents of the technique traditionally stress it is not an insult. Erik von Markovik, who is usually credited with popularising the term negs, explains the difference thus: "A neg is not an insult but a negative social value judgment that is telegraphed. It's the same as if you pulled out a tissue and blew your nose. There's nothing insulting about blowing your nose. You haven't explicitly rejected her. But at the same time, she will feel that you aren't even trying to impress her. This makes her curious as to why and makes you a challenge."

Neil Strauss, in his book Rules of the Game, also stresses that the primary point of the technique is not to put women down but for a man to disqualify himself as a potential suitor. On this account he refers to negs as "disqualifiers", although the technique described in the book is recognisably the same as von Markovik's. Strauss is equally clear that negs should not be used as insults: "a disqualifier should never be hostile, critical, judgmental, or condescending. There's a line between flirting and hurting. And disqualification is never intended to be mean and insulting."

The term has been popularized in social media and mainstream media. The opposite of negging is pozzing, whereby one pays a person a compliment in order to gain their affection. However, pozzing can also refer to the intentional transmission of HIV.
