= How to Make Money Like a Porn Star =

2006 graphic novel

- Author: Neil Strauss with Bernard Chang
- Publisher: ReganBooks / HarperCollins
- Publication date: September 26, 2006
- Media type: Print (Paperback/Graphic Novel)
- Pages: 128
- ISBN: 0-06-088405-3
- OCLC: 70046019
- Dewey Decimal: 741.5 22
- LC Class: PN6727.S765 H68 2006

How to Make Money Like a Porn Star is the first graphic novel published by ReganBooks/HarperCollins, written by New York Times bestselling author Neil Strauss and illustrated by artist Bernard Chang. Strauss and Chang have collaborated on two previous books, How to Make Love Like a Porn Star (the autobiography of porn queen Jenna Jameson), and The Game: Penetrating the Secret Society of Pickup Artists.

The book also features magazine articles, faux ads, and an activity book, and includes additional art contributions from illustrators Sean Chen, John Paul Leon, Gregg Schigiel, and Mark Moretti.

The book has been reprinted in Italy and the Czech Republic. It is banned in Singapore.
