= Ross Jeffries =

American writer and television personality

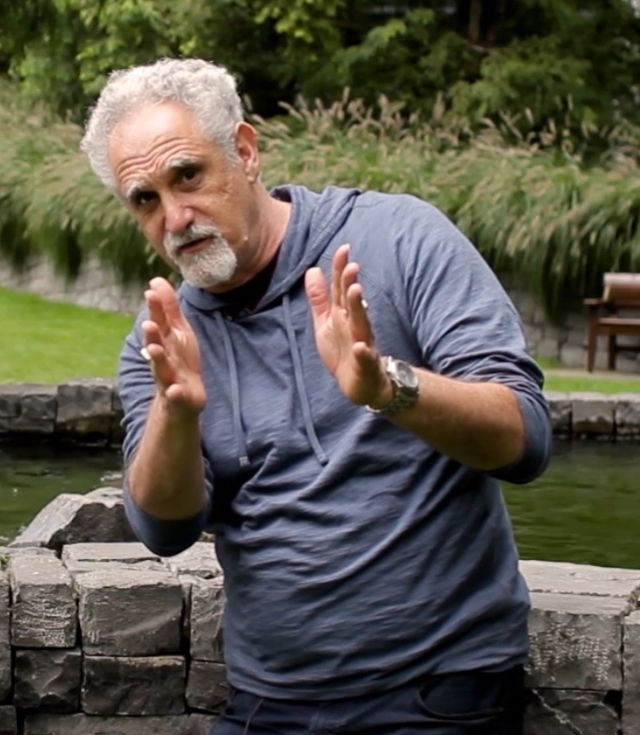
- Jeffries in 2018
- Born: Paul Jeffrey Ross; 1958 or 1959 (age 67–68)
- Occupations: Writer, author, life coach, seduction guru

Paul Jeffrey Ross (born 1958 or 1959 (age 67–68), known by the pseudonym Ross Jeffries, is an American author and pickup artist.

Neil Strauss, in his 2005 book The Game, describes Jeffries as the "godfather" of the modern pick-up artist community.

== Career ==
In 1988, Jeffries started to study seduction. He taught workshops and promoted a collection of neuro-linguistic programming (NLP)-based techniques called "speed seduction". His teachings claim to show men how to create the desired emotional state in a woman by leading her imagination for the purpose of seduction, rather than to focus on a specific behavior or action of hers, as the desired outcome.

In 1992, he was on a segment of NBC's Faith Daniels Show, appearing with men's rights activist Mel Feit and feminist and ethicist Bruce Weinstein. Jeffries has also been featured on The Dr. Phil Show, The Montel Williams Show, The Jane Whitney Show and The Daily Show, and is a self-described "speed seduction expert." In 2000, Jeffries was featured on Louis Theroux's Weird Weekends.

In 2000, Jeffries sued John White (also known as Don Steele) alleging invasion of privacy, business interference, slander and libel.

In his book The Game, published in 2005, author Neil Strauss describes his experience shadowing Jeffries during Strauss' investigation of the seduction community. He writes that Jeffries acted as the mentor to Mystery and himself. Jeffries is Jewish.

Tom Cruise's character Frank T.J. Mackey in the film Magnolia was inspired by Jeffries, according to the film's writer-director Paul Thomas Anderson.

== Books ==
- Jeffries, Ross (September 1992). How to Get the Women You Desire into Bed. Smart Corporation. ISBN 9780963037909.
- Jeffries, Ross (May 11, 2010). Secrets of Speed Seduction Mastery. Lulu.com. ISBN 9780557388493.
- Jeffries, Ross (February 22, 2018). Subtle Words That Sell: How to Get Your Prospects to Convince Themselves to Buy Without Pushing, Pressuring Or Pitching. Amazon Digital Services LLC - Kdp Print Us. ISBN 978-0-692-07689-7.
