= How to Make Love Like a Porn Star =

Autobiography of Jenna Jameson

How to Make Love Like a Porn Star: A Cautionary Tale
- Author: Jenna Jameson with Neil Strauss
- Publisher: ReganBooks
- Publication date: September 1, 2004
- Media type: Print (Hardcover)
- Pages: 592
- ISBN: 0-06-053909-7
- OCLC: 54966226
- Dewey Decimal: 791.4302/8/092 B 22
- LC Class: PN2287.J295 A3 2004

How to Make Love Like a Porn Star: A Cautionary Tale is the autobiography of adult film star Jenna Jameson, published August 17, 2004. It was mainly written by co-writer Neil Strauss, later famous for writing The Game, and published by ReganBooks, a division of HarperCollins. It was an instant best-seller, spending six weeks on the New York Times Best Seller list. The autobiography also won the 2004 "Mainstream's Adult Media Favorite" XRCO award in a tie with Seymore Butts's Family Business TV series.

== Overview ==
The nearly 600 page book is divided into Books numbered with Roman numerals, each preceded by an epigraph from a Shakespearean sonnet. The narrative is told through a series of first person accounts, interviews with her family, diary entries in a font resembling handwriting, personal photos, movie scripts, and comic book panels. It covers her life from her childhood to her beginning in show business as a stripper, living with her tattoo artist biker boyfriend, and ends with her receiving the Hot D'Or award at Cannes and her second wedding. Jameson tells of multiple rapes, drug addictions, an unhappy first marriage, and numerous affairs with men and women.

== Film ==
Jameson has expressed interest in having actress Scarlett Johansson play her in a feature film version of the book. A representative for Johansson, however, has stated that Johansson has no interest in such a role.

== Related book ==
Strauss has written a similarly titled and themed book, How to Make Money Like a Porn Star, mainly in graphic novel format, and without Jameson's participation. Strauss wrote it from stories he learned of while researching Jameson's book. Like How to Make Love..., How to Make Money... also features different formats, including magazine articles, fake advertisements, and an activity book.

== Reception ==
A review by Jane and Michael Stern in The New York Times describes it as a memoir and self-help book filled with exhaustive accounts of filmed sex scenes, advice on becoming a porn star, and anecdotes about her life. The book covers her journey from a "17-year-old biker chick" in Las Vegas to becoming "the most downloaded person online". The review praises Jameson's writing stamina and her attempts to elevate the book's content by referencing Shakespeare and literature, but also notes the book's excessive data and irrelevant information. Noting that the book is unlikely to offer much useful information for those who prefer having sex in private, the review acknowledges it as a gold mine for aspiring performers.

A review in Publishers Weekly praises Jameson's autobiography as a witty and frank portrayal of her life in the porn industry, calling it "a remarkably appealing and honest mess" and predicting that it was destined to become a "lowbrow classic" that would help earn Jameson some mainstream acceptance.
