= Petro-masculinity =

Variety of masculinity related to fossil fuels

Petro-masculinity is an analytical label to describe a variety of masculinity associated with car dependency and the fossil fuel industry, including both the workers in the industry and promoters of the industry in the large social and civic space. Though petro-masculinities have existed as part of different fossil fuel industries, the analysis of them became important in the late 2010s as the connection of masculinity cultures with climate change denial.

The widespread use of the term in scholarship and public discourse started with Cara Daggett's in her 2018 paper "Petro-masculinity: Fossil Fuels and Authoritarian Desire" argues that petromasculinity connects male identity with various issues of power such as colonialism and extractivism.

Petromasculinity tends to emphasize several different types of cultural performances of masculinity, including:

- The importance of the "breadwinner" role of men in families
- Images of muscular male bodies.
- Symbols of economic power of men and nostalgia for fossil fuel technologies, such as cars that consume lots of fossil fuels as opposed to greener alternatives. Often these fossil fuel vehicles are depicted as loud and belching large amounts of black smoke.
- War, military action and other violence
- Environmental protection as being "feminine" behaviors
- Denial of the severity of climate change. or other kinds of environmental destruction.

Together, these narratives have become aligned with far-right and authoritarian politics in much of Europe and North America, and is advanced by influencers in masculinity culture, such as Manosphere influencers Andrew Tate, Joe Rogan and Jordan Peterson. Legal researcher, Monica Iyer argued that the use of these kinds of narratives in public discourse has changed the legal possibility space around climate action.

Some scholars have begun evaluating how femininity has been used for similar rhetorical effect in the communications of the fossil fuel industry.
