= The Dirt =

Autobiography of Mötley Crüe, with Neil Strauss

The Dirt: Confessions of the World's Most Notorious Rock Band
- Author: Tommy Lee, Mick Mars, Vince Neil, Nikki Sixx, Neil Strauss
- Language: English
- Genre: Autobiography
- Publisher: HarperEntertainment (hardback), ReganBooks (paperback)
- Publication date: May 22, 2001 (first edition)
- Publication place: United States
- Media type: print (hardback & paperback)
- Pages: 431 (hardback), 448 (paperback)
- ISBN: 0-06-098915-7
- OCLC: 50170658
- Followed by: The Heroin Diaries (2007)

The Dirt: Confessions of the World's Most Notorious Rock Band (ISBN 0-06-098915-7) is a collaborative autobiography of Mötley Crüe by the band – Tommy Lee, Mick Mars, Vince Neil, and Nikki Sixx – and New York Times writer Neil Strauss. First published in 2001, it chronicles the formation of the band, their rise to fame and their highs and lows. The book contains over 100 photographs. The first hardback edition was on the New York Times Bestseller list for four weeks and sold 13,000 copies in the UK.

The Crüe's 2008 album Saints of Los Angeles was inspired by the book.

== Film adaptation ==
A film based on the book has long been mooted. "Anybody can make a shitty rock movie," observed Sixx. "We don't want to do that. A lot of people don't understand rock music and the rock 'n' roll lifestyle. It's not just sex, drugs and car crashes. Those things happen – and, in our case, more than usual. But what's at the core of it all is the creativity and the personal relationships between each band member. We don't just want to slap together the thrill moments. Any of the great movies, whether it's Walk the Line or Ray, they got the music right and the personalities right."

After years in development ("Bringing the story of our lives to screen in just the right way isn't easy," remarked Mars), the adaptation was filmed in 2018 with Jeff Tremaine as director. It was released on Netflix on March 22, 2019. The band members of Mötley Crüe are co-producers on the film.

== Soundtrack ==
The Dirt Soundtrack was released by Mötley Records and Eleven Seven Records on March 22, 2019, on CD, LP, and digital formats.

== Reception ==
The AV Club described the book as a tell-all about the rock star life that had "soul-crushing moments" and moments where the protagonists reach "moments of clarity." They compared it to Marilyn Manson’s The Long Hard Road Out of Hell.

NPR called it a "gritty homage" and a "good dirty rock read."

"You could take both the Led Zeppelin and Aerosmith books [Hammer of the Gods and Walk This Way, respectively], mash them together with contaminated blood and as much bullshit as it takes to stick the pages," wrote Mick Wall, "and you still wouldn't have something as brilliantly conceived or vividly told as The Dirt. Far more than any of their mostly patchy albums, The Dirt stands as Mötley Crüe's most convincing monument to four lives lived the hard and fast way."

"They may be one of the worst bands to scale the platinum peaks of success," remarked Uncut, "but Mötley Crüe, in cahoots with Marilyn Manson biographer Neil Strauss, have a hell of a story to tell… A book to make the mighty Tap themselves shiver with fear."
