= Julien Blanc =

Swiss-born motivational speaker (born 1988)

- Born: October 24, 1988 (age 38); Lausanne, Vaud, Switzerland
- Occupation: Motivational speaker⁣

Julien Blanc, also known as "JulienHimself", is a motivational speaker on YouTube, Instagram, TikTok, Facebook and Twitter. He is a former executive coach for the Los Angeles–based company Real Social Dynamics (RSD). In 2015, Julien started his own YouTube channel and is touring the world with self-help seminars.

== Real Social Dynamics (RSD) ==
Blanc used to be an instructor employed by Real Social Dynamics, a U.S.-based company which offered seminars throughout the world to men seeking advice on how to find their ideal partner.

A seminar led by Blanc in Miami was featured in a TV documentary, The Hunt for Real Men, by the British documentary maker Tim Samuels broadcast on the Bio channel on June 27, 2014. In a later interview with BBC, Samuels described the seminar as being "in a classroom, in a hotel, with a hundred, two hundred guys who start making notes, with Blanc at the front as the kind of rock star guru, people hanging on every word, and generally getting fairly practical tips on how to approach women with a sense of self confidence."

== Controversy ==
In November 2014, Blanc became the subject of a social media campaign alleging that his old dating advice could encourage sexual violence, involving multiple petitions on those grounds to deny him entry to several nations. On November 17, Blanc made an appearance on CNN denying these accusations, stating that his comments were "a horrible attempt at humour" taken out of context.

Sarah Green from the End Violence Against Women Coalition, however, said that there was a strong legal case for denying Blanc a temporary work visa for the United Kingdom. She stated that, "Some of the behaviour Blanc demonstrates in his videos amounts to sexual harassment and sexual assault."

=== YouTube videos and social media campaign ===
On September 8, 2014, Blanc posted a video titled "White Aldiyar fucks Asian women in Tokyo (and the beautiful methods to it)" to his YouTube channel. The video, which has since been removed, shows Blanc presenting a seminar to a roomful of men. In the seminar, Blanc describes his opinion that "sub-communication," not the use of words or methods, is all that matters. He justifies this with his past experience in approaching women in Tokyo. Blanc comments that "in Tokyo, if you're a white male, you can do what you want" and "all you have to say to kinda like take the pressure off is just yell 'Pikachu' or 'Pokémon' or 'Tamagotchi' or something," as he describes himself in Tokyo "romping through the streets" and "grabbing women" whilst shoving their faces in his crotch, saying "Pikachu".

In response to the video, Jennifer Li, an Asian-American woman living in Washington, D.C., initiated a campaign aimed at preventing Blanc from hosting further similar seminars, using the hashtag "#TakeDownJulienBlanc" on social media in early November 2014. Li initiated a petition on Change.org calling upon hotels and other venues to cancel his bookings and for webhosts to stop hosting Blanc's and Real Social Dynamics' websites. In an article in the British newspaper, The Independent, Li asserted that Blanc's video and other content he had posted online taught men how to assault women and that his video taught that "Asian women are a 'free for all' for predatory men," thereby encouraging men to abuse Asian women. Li also reported Blanc's video to the Japanese embassy.

Li's campaign spread quickly and led to wider criticism of Blanc's teachings. Besides the Tokyo video, Blanc's critics have noted other issues which they allege prove that Blanc promotes and teaches domestic violence and emotional abuse as a form of "seduction". On one occasion Blanc posted a "Power and Control Wheel" graphic associated with the Duluth model intended to illustrate ways in which women in abusive relationships are controlled and abused by their male partners. Blanc's posting of the graphic was accompanied by the description and hashtag "May as well be a checklist.... #HowToMakeHerStay". Critics of Blanc have claimed that Blanc promotes rape and teaches men how to engage in sex with women by violating their consent and using psychological abuse and sexual violence, that he promotes the view that he and his followers are "intellectual superiors" to whom it is the role of women to subordinate themselves, and that his teachings encourage potential abusers to believe that abusive behavior towards women will not be taken seriously.

By November 6, 2014, Li's social media campaign had led to Blanc's and Real Social Dynamics events in Melbourne, Brisbane, Austin, and Seattle being shut down and in online ticketing service Eventbrite removing all Real Social Dynamics events from its site. Blanc's Instagram account was also closed, many of his YouTube videos were set to private, and some of the content from his Twitter account was removed. Scheduled "boot camps" in Japan and also in Canada were canceled by Real Social Dynamics until further notice around November 13 out of a fear that their instructor's safety could not be guaranteed.

=== Response by Blanc and Real Social Dynamics ===
In a November 17, 2014, interview on CNN, Blanc made a public apology and repudiated the accusations against him. He said that the videos were a "horrible, horrible attempt at humor" and taken out of context, denying accusations of promoting rape or of coaching clients to use domestic violence or abuse to seduce women.

Critics denounced Blanc's photos published on the internet with the "#ChokingGirlsAroundTheWorld" hashtag showing him approaching women and clasping their throats as legitimizing violence and physical abuse as part of seducing women. Blanc's response was that he did place his hand around their necks but "did not physically choke them", and that his intent in posting the photos in that way was merely to "provoke a shock", and was a "horrible attempt at humor."

In response to criticism of Blanc's post of a graphic of ways in which women can be abused, Blanc denied that he used the graphic in his course or that he teaches it, instead saying "this is so far in the opposite direction of what I teach, that I stupidly thought, you know mocking it would be funny." Blanc teaches when to "back off". Blanc stated that he was overwhelmed by the criticisms and that he was "reevaluating everything" that he publishes on the Internet.

Real Social Dynamics co-founder Owen Cook, using the online nickname Tyler Durden, wrote on the RSD website, "I think Julien's video was absolutely stupid," saying that the video was out of context and that Blanc had posted it for shock value, not realizing the full outcome the situation would lead to.

Responding to Blanc's interview, Jennifer Li's impression of the apology was that "he is sorry he got caught, not for what he has done."

Julien Blanc shared more details in a later interview with Ryan Holiday, which was published in the Observer:

=== Visas revoked or denied in Australia, the United Kingdom, and Singapore ===
Blanc's Australian tour, which had begun in Sydney on October 29, 2014, was cut short by cancellations prompted by petitions and protests, including a protest of a seminar led by Blanc's assistant Maximilian Berger on a Melbourne River Cruises boat moored on the Yarra River in Southbank, Melbourne. The boat company cancelled the seminar booking mid-event, and local police were called in to restore order. Protesters also petitioned to have Blanc deported from Australia. Blanc's Australian visa was revoked on November 6, 2014, and the following day Victoria police confirmed that he had left Australia overnight, with his assistant scheduled to follow. Australia's Immigration minister Scott Morrison told Sky News: "This guy wasn't putting forward political ideas, he was putting forward abuse that was derogatory to women ... those are values abhorred in this country."

An online petition to deny Blanc entry to the UK was also initiated in November. Blanc had reportedly already given a series of seminars in London during September 2014, and was scheduled for two return visits to London in late 2014 and early 2015. Alleging that permitting Blanc into the country "legitimises sexual assault and predation" and that his pick-up techniques "directly exploit vulnerable men who buy into rape culture and end up believing that this is an appropriate way to behave," shadow home secretary (Labour) Yvette Cooper called upon Home Secretary Theresa May to deny Blanc entry to the country. Under paragraph 320 of the Immigration Rules, the Home Secretary can refuse any visa "on general grounds because of a person's background, behaviour, character, conduct or associations." The UK denied Blanc a visa on November 19, 2014. Following the visa denial, the BBC interviewed documentary maker Tim Samuels about his perceptions of the seminar taught by Blanc featured in Samuels' documentary The Hunt for Real Men broadcast the previous June. Samuels said he and his team had seen nothing that "crossed the line," but that the videos and photos which later came to light had "cast a shadow" over what had seemed an essentially harmless enterprise.

An online petition campaign in Singapore resulted in a joint statement on November 26 by the Singapore's Immigration & Checkpoints Authority and its Ministry of Social and Family Development that Blanc would not be allowed into Singapore, which he had been scheduled to visit during a tour in late 2014.

=== Other nations ===
Online petitions seeking to cancel seminars conducted by Blanc or other RSD coaches, or to deny entry into specific nations or cities have been launched in several other countries, including Japan, Canada, the city of Amsterdam (Netherlands), Argentina, Iceland, Ireland, Germany, Denmark, Sweden and New Zealand. In Japan, customs officials raised the concern that Blanc had not had a proper work permit on his earlier visit to Tokyo. They stated that the crime kyōsei waisetsu, translated literally as "forcible indecency", appeared to be committed in the video but that such charges require a victim's testimony. In Germany, a press spokesman with the Green Party expressed doubt that Blanc could be prevented from entering the country, but believed that Blanc's scheduled December 2014 seminar in Munich would probably take place at a secret location. Blanc will not be blocked from entering Denmark, according to Socialdemokraterne justice spokesperson Trine Bramsen, who said that to be denied entry he "must have committed a crime or have no legal business in Denmark."

In some cases, immigration authorities have indicated an intent to deny Blanc entry into their countries apparently without having been petitioned. The Brazilian Foreign Ministry indicated that Brazil would deny him a visa if he applied for one, in spite of planned seminars in January 2015. Though Blanc was reportedly scheduled for a visit to South Korea in December 2014, the Border Control Division of the Korea Immigration Service said that Blanc would be unlikely to gain entry to the country, with an anonymous official telling South Korean journalist Lee Tae-hoon that Blanc's activities ran against the "morals and customs" of the country.

=== Supporters ===
Blanc's supporters tried to rally around him by claiming that petitions calling for Blanc to be refused entry to various countries amounts to censorship and violation of free speech.

Critics of the social media campaigns against Blanc have initiated a counterpetition in his support urging nations not to deny his freedom of speech and asserting that "Denying him a visa would be an incredible injustice to a man who has committed no crimes". However, these counter campaigns defending Blanc only garnered 3,535 supporters, compared to the multiple petitions lodged against him that garnered 330,979 signatures.

One of Blanc's personal assistants spoke to Newsbeat (a BBC Radio 1 programme) on November 20, 2014, asserting that Blanc's content had been misinterpreted by the media, supporting Blanc's earlier claims that his coaching content had been taken out of context. Jennifer Li was censored off the radio for repeating some of the racist and misogynist language that Blanc's followers had used on her.

There were also counterarguments to the "free speech" claims; and counter-counter supporters asserted that freedom of speech does not include freedom to incite violence against women.

== Own channel and self-help seminars ==
After the media scandals, Blanc started his own YouTube channel called JulienHimself in May 2015. He tours the world holding self-help seminars.
