= Femosphere =

Collection of feminist online communities

The femosphere (also called the womanosphere) is an umbrella term for a diverse ecology of online communities, content creators, and spaces centred on women's experiences of gender, dating, and relationships. The term was coined by feminist media researcher Jilly Boyce Kay, who defined it as a loose network of female-centric online spaces that emerged primarily from 2018 onward, partly in reaction to the manosphere. While some scholars characterise the femosphere as broadly misandrist and a gender-flipped mirror of the manosphere, others have emphasised its internal variation, noting that communities within it differ considerably in size, ideology, and intent.

== History and ideology ==
The term "femosphere" was coined by Jilly Boyce Kay, a feminist media researcher at Loughborough University, in a 2024 paper published in Feminist Media Studies. Kay traced the emergence of these communities to 2018, situating their growth in the context of the global visibility of #MeToo and the concurrent rise of what scholar Sarah Banet-Weiser has described as the co-development of "popular feminism" and "popular misogyny" in digital networks.

Kay characterises the femosphere as sharing key logics with the manosphere — including bio-essentialism, political fatalism, and a rejection of collective feminist politics in favour of individualised strategy. Brittany Melton, a media studies researcher at Western University, situates the femosphere as encompassing online communities predominantly occupied by women that serve as platforms for gender discourse and challenges to traditional dating norms, noting that communities within it vary significantly in ideology.

Communities identified within the femosphere include female dating strategists, femcels (women who identify as involuntarily celibate), Women Going Their Own Way (WGTOW), and gender-critical feminist communities. Researchers have noted that these groups vary considerably in their orientations toward men, with some advocating strategic engagement, others financial selectivity, and others varying degrees of withdrawal from heterosexual relationships altogether.

Femosphere narratives frequently involve a rejection of liberal feminism, asserting that it has failed to deliver meaningful change in women's lived experiences of relationships and dating. Some scholars have described this as part of a broader reactionary turn in popular feminism, in which the affective energies of movements like #MeToo have been redirected toward individualised rather than collective responses to gender inequality. Others have argued that the movement's appeal is better understood as a response to specific structural conditions in contemporary dating culture — including the normalisation of relational ambiguity, the psychological costs of dating app culture, and rising rates of female burnout — rather than as a straightforwardly ideological phenomenon.

== Reception ==
Academic reception of the femosphere has been mixed. Kay and collaborators have consistently emphasised the movement's ideological similarities to the manosphere, arguing that despite its ostensibly pro-woman framing, the femosphere replicates the manosphere's bio-essentialist and fatalistic logics. From this perspective, femosphere communities represent a reactionary rather than progressive response to gender inequality.

Other commentators have argued for a more nuanced assessment. Press coverage of the movement has noted that many women who engage with femosphere content do not identify with its most extreme expressions, and that the movement encompasses a wide range of positions on relationships, strategy, and gender.

The question of whether the femosphere is primarily a toxic mirror of the manosphere or a legitimate, if imperfect, response to real structural conditions in modern dating remains actively debated among researchers and cultural commentators.
