= Roosh V =

American writer and men's rights activist

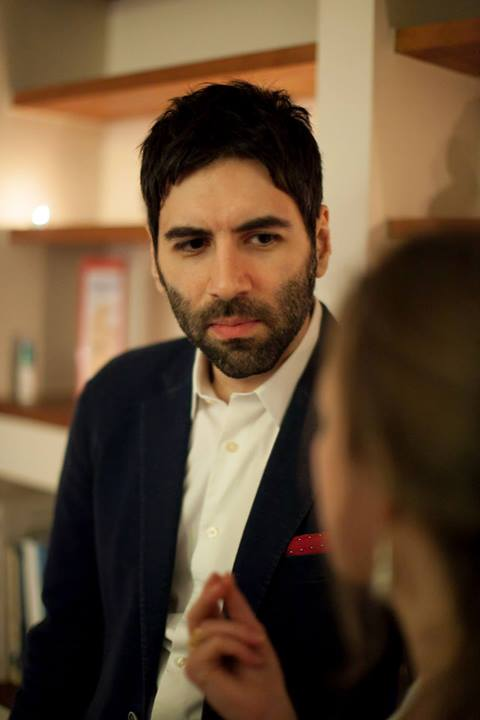
- Roosh V in 2014
- Born: Daryush Valizadeh; June 14, 1979 (age 47); Washington, D.C., U.S.
- Education: University of Maryland

Daryush Valizadeh (born June 14, 1979), also known as Roosh Valizadeh, Roosh V and Roosh Vorek (or Vörek), is an American former alt-right blogger and pickup artist. Valizadeh wrote on his personal blog and also owned the Return of Kings website and Roosh V Forum, where he published articles by himself and others on related subjects. Valizadeh has self-published more than a dozen dating and travel guides, most of which discuss picking up and having relations with women in specific countries. His advice, his videos and his writings have received widespread criticism, including accusations of misogyny, antisemitism, homophobia, and having ties to the alt-right.

Many of Valizadeh's publications have been taken down. On May 30, 2018, DreamHost took down Kings Wiki. On September 10, 2018, several of Valizadeh's books were removed from Amazon.com's self-publishing platform. He was also sanctioned by YouTube, another source of revenue for him, for violating their rules. On October 1, 2018, citing a loss of revenue and traffic due to PayPal's and Disqus's terminating their partnerships with him, Valizadeh announced Return of Kings would no longer be publishing new articles.

In March 2019, Valizadeh converted to the Armenian Apostolic Church and condemned extramarital and casual sex as sinful, also stating that he was embarrassed about the books he wrote in the past, unpublishing some of them. On May 1, 2021, Valizadeh was received into the Russian Orthodox Church Outside of Russia (ROCOR) at Jordanville Seminary in Jordanville, New York.

On Sunday, October 29, 2023, Valizadeh closed his online forum and decided to move on from public internet life: "I have a regular job now and want to live a normal Orthodox life. This forum is a hinderance [sic] to that end."

== Background ==
=== Early life ===
Valizadeh was born June 14, 1979, in Washington DC, to an Iranian father and an Armenian mother. Valizadeh graduated from the University of Maryland, College Park in 2001 with a degree in microbiology. He began blogging about his attempts to meet women, but once his internet anonymity was broken, he turned to blogging and writing full-time as a means to supporting himself, first with the publication of Bang: The Pickup Bible That Helps You Get More Lays (2007), and then with dating-themed travel guides on the countries he had visited.

=== Personal views ===
==== 2007–2018 ====
Valizadeh began his writing career with advice based on pickup artist culture, although by 2016 no longer identified with the term.

Valizadeh calls his system of beliefs "Neomasculinity", which he describes as a combination of biology and traditional beliefs on masculinity, and as a rejection of "Western degeneracy". Valizadeh advocates adherence to traditional heteronormative roles for men and women, and believes that feminism has harmed women, men, and society in general. In addition, he states that men and women are physically and mentally very different and that much of women's value comes from their fertility and beauty. Valizadeh describes himself as "pro-woman" in that he wants women "to live a life that is according to their biological genetics."

In a 2013 Washington Times Communities interview, he alleges that feminism has left a legacy of weaker men who are more androgynous. He went on to say that women abstain from having sex with them in preference for "bad boys".

Valizadeh has been described as a men's rights activist by The Daily Beast, Salon, S. E. Smith, and others.

He has expressed qualified support for Donald Trump. He said that Trump's election as President of the United States would lead to the "death of political correctness". He has also said The Daily Beast is run by the CIA.

By 2016, Valizadeh had changed his focus from pickup advice to political commentary. His book Free Speech Isn't Free discusses ways in which, he says, straight men are denied freedom of speech.

==== 2019–present ====
On March 29, 2019, Valizadeh announced that after years of backsliding, he had committed himself to God and the Armenian Apostolic Church, an Oriental Orthodox Christian denomination, but he shortly left the Oriental Orthodox Churches for the Eastern Orthodox Church, being baptized by the Russian Orthodox Church Outside of Russia (ROCOR). In light of his conversion to Christianity, Valizadeh instituted a set of new rules on his forum in which he banned discussion of extramarital sex; he also removed many of his books from print as he felt they would lead other men into committing sin. Valizadeh has stated that the "red pill" was a transitory stage in his life before he came to the realization of and taking "the final 'pill': God." Valizadeh has stated that "The God pill does feel like the final destination, where life becomes about asking Him for help and performing His will in a way that embraces good."

On October 9, 2023, Valizadeh announced that he would be closing the Roosh V Forum down after 15 years of operation, citing his desire to put his Internet presence behind him and the fact he had obtained employment. Return of Kings had been closed down a year prior, on December 21, 2022, citing Valizadeh's religious views. The forum closed down on October 29, and remained online as an archive until December 1, when it and his blog were taken down.

== Controversy ==
=== United States ===
In a March 2012 report on "The Year in Hate and Extremism", the Southern Poverty Law Center included Valizadeh in a list of manosphere sites which it described as hateful and misogynistic. His inclusion on the list was reported by several publications, some of which mocked the inclusion for being extreme. In response to criticism, the SPLC later clarified that it was not labeling the sites as members of a hate movement, but wished to draw attention to "specific examples of misogyny and the threat, overt or implicit, of violence".

In 2014, The Washington Post columnist Caitlin Dewey stated that Valizadeh was one of a number of internet writers considered misogynist, writing: "Valizadeh owns the website ReturnofKings.com, which bans 'women and homosexuals' from commenting." Dewey commented that recent articles on ReturnofKings.com included titles such as "5 Reasons to Date a Girl With an Eating Disorder", "Don't Work for a Female Boss" and "Biology Says People on Welfare Should Die".

In February 2014, The Daily Dot magazine named Valizadeh "The Web's most infamous misogynist" and observed "his extraordinarily vitriolic and misogynistic views about women and society as a whole".

In May 2014, Valizadeh commented on the 2014 Isla Vista killings, in which Elliot Rodger shot several people after writing a manifesto attributing his actions to frustration over his inceldom. Valizadeh said that his community "is the solution to this sort of murder rampage" and that "exposing him to game may have saved lives". Valizadeh argued, "Until you give men like Rodger a way to have sex, either by encouraging them to learn game, seek out a Thai wife, or engage in legalized prostitution ... it's inevitable for another massacre to occur." He also stated that "if Rodger came to me, he would have received actionable and effective advice".

In February 2015, Valizadeh was criticized for a blog post that he wrote titled "How to Stop Rape" in which he proposed legalizing rape on private property. In the post, he wrote: "If rape becomes legal under my proposal, a girl will protect her body in the same manner that she protects her purse and smartphone. If rape becomes legal, a girl will not enter an impaired state of mind where she can't resist being dragged off to a bedroom with a man who she is unsure of—she'll scream, yell, or kick at his attempt while bystanders are still around. If rape becomes legal, she will never be unchaperoned with a man she doesn't want to sleep with. After several months of advertising this law throughout the land, rape would be virtually eliminated on the first day it is applied." Valizadeh has said that the post was meant as satire, arguing that its very title indicates that it was not intended as rape advocacy.

=== Canada ===
In 2015, Valizadeh scheduled speeches to take place in Montreal on August 8 and Toronto on August 15. In July 2015, Vancouver resident Sara Parker-Toulson launched a petition on Change.org that called for Valizadeh to be barred from entering Canada, accusing him of violating Canadian hate speech laws. It gathered over 38,000 signatures. Concordia University student Fannie Gadouas publicized the petition and was interviewed by the media following her efforts, with Montreal resident Aurelie Nix, to organize a protest event in Montreal. Nix also lodged a complaint against Valizadeh with the police, saying that he had incited his followers to make rape and death threats against her.

The petition and protest were in response to plans by Valizadeh to give speeches in Toronto and Montreal.

Quebec Member of the National Assembly Carole Poirier called on Stéphanie Vallée, Quebec Minister of Justice for Conditions for Women, to ban Valizadeh and his rhetoric from the province. Vallée responded by condemning Roosh's statements, but declined to make further comments regarding whether he should be denied entry to Canada. Reportedly in response to the negative publicity and threat of protest, the Hotel Omni Montreal, where the speech had been scheduled to be held, cancelled the event. Valizadeh asked that his followers assist him in a "counter-attack" against the demonstrators by collecting personal information about them. A café owner, who surreptitiously took a photograph of Valizadeh sitting in his establishment and published it to Instagram with an invitation to others to come confront Valizadeh, later said he felt threatened by the ensuing response from Valizadeh's followers.

Valizadeh stated that the event location was changed to a different venue and took place on August 8 as scheduled with about 34 people in attendance. Afterwards, a crowd of protestors confronted Valizadeh at a local bar and threw drinks at him, prompting him and his companions to leave the bar as the group followed while continuing to scream at Valizadeh and curse him. Valizadeh filed a complaint with police over the incident, and police said they were investigating a person known as "Jennifer" who was alleged to be one of the assailants.

Before Valizadeh's scheduled speech in Toronto on August 15, city councillor Norm Kelly and mayor John Tory denounced Valizadeh and encouraged city venues to turn him away, declaring publicly that he was not welcome in Toronto. On August 15, a protest against Valizadeh, attended by Member of Parliament Cheri DiNovo, was held at Queen's Park. Later that day, Valizadeh tweeted a photograph of himself at what he said was the event venue in Mississauga and said he delivered his speech to 56 people. Both Valizadeh and the protestors declared victory in their dispute over his appearances in Canada.

=== Nordic countries ===
The Icelandic publication DV published a number of stories about Valizadeh's release of his book Bang Iceland, calling it "derogatory". Icelandic feminist organization Femínistafélag Íslands condemned the book as a "rape guide." Another publication labelled it "slander." Icelandic writer and media personality Egill Einarsson said the book was "as wrong as possible".

Danish Ekstra Bladet published five articles on the release of Valizadeh's book Don't Bang Denmark, and Danish TV aired several discussions sparked by the book.

Norwegian Dagbladet newspaper questioned the morality of Valizadeh's seduction tactics in an article warning about the rise of the "manosphere".

In Finland, Valizadeh's mention of the Helsinki nightclub Milliklubi in his article "The 5 Easiest Clubs In The World To Get Laid" had a negative impact on the club several days after it went out, according to the door man. The increased number of male visitors inspired by the article raised security concerns.

=== Baltic states ===
Valizadeh's books Bang Estonia, Don't Bang Latvia, and Bang Lithuania were met with a generally negative reaction from media outlets of those countries, where he was described as a "sex tourist". During an interview with Delfi in response to a question about whether he was a sex tourist, Valizadeh responded that he was a love tourist, not a sex tourist.

== Bibliography ==
- Bang: How to Get Laid in 60 days (2007) (2nd edition in 2010 subtitled Bang: The Pickup Bible That Helps You Get More Lays in 60 Days and Bang: The Most Infamous Pickup Book In The World)
- A Dead Bat in Paraguay: One Man’s Peculiar Journey Through South America (2009)
- Bang Colombia: Textbook On How To Sleep With Colombian Women (2010)
- Roosh’s Brazil Compendium: Pickup Tips, City Guides, And Stories (2011)
- Roosh’s Argentina Compendium: Pickup Tips, City Guides, And Stories (2011)
- Compliment & Cuddle: The Beta Male Method To Getting Laid (2011)
- Bang Iceland: How To Sleep With Icelandic Women In Iceland (2011)
- Day Bang: How to Casually Pick up Girls During the Day (2011)
- Don’t Bang Denmark: How To Sleep With Danish Women In Denmark (If You Must) (2011)
- 30 Bangs: The Shaping Of One Man’s Game From Patient Mouse To Rabid Wolf (2012)
- Gheridge (2012) (short story)
- The Brazilian Movie Actress (2012) (short story)
- The Medellin Diaries (2012) (short story)
- Sour DSLs (2012) (short story)
- Bang Poland: How To Make Love With Polish Girls In Poland (2012)
- Bang Lithuania: How To Sleep With Lithuanian Women In Lithuania (2012)
- Bang Estonia: How To Make Love With Estonian Girls In Estonia (2012)
- Don’t Bang Latvia: How To Sleep With Latvian Women In Latvia Without Getting Scammed (2012)
- Bang Ukraine: How To Sleep With Ukrainian Women In Ukraine (2012)
- Why Can’t I Use a Smiley-Face: Stories From One Month In America (2013)
- The Best of Roosh - Volume One: Deep into Game (2013) (2nd edition in 2019)
- Poosy Paradise (2014)
- Free Speech Isn’t Free: How 90 Men Stood Up Against The Globalist Establishment -- And Won (2016)
- Jake Ultra (2018) (short story)
- Game: How To Meet, Attract, And Date Attractive Women (2018)
- Lady: How To Meet And Keep A Good Man For Love And Marriage (2019)
- The Best Of Roosh - Volume 2 : Understanding Women (2019)
- American Pilgrim (2021)
