= The Pickup Artist (TV series) =

American reality television show

- Genre: Reality; Game show
- Created by: 3Ball Productions
- Starring: Mystery (Erik von Markovik); James Matador (Stan Tayi); J-Dog (Justin Marks); Tara Ferguson
- Country of origin: United States
- Original language: English
- No. of seasons: 2
- No. of episodes: 16

Production
- Executive producers: J. D. Roth; Todd A. Nelson; Adam Greener; Doug Wilson; Clair McCabe; Michael Hirschorn; Jeff Olde; Suzanne Murch
- Producer: Angela Malloy
- Editors: Taatshing Hui; Tim Preston
- Camera setup: Multi-camera
- Running time: 43 mins.
- Production company: 3Ball Productions

Original release
- Network: VH1
- Release: August 6, 2007 – November 30, 2008

The Pickup Artist is an American reality television dating themed game show that aired on VH1. The show was hosted by pickup artist Mystery (Erik von Markovik) and his wings J-Dog (Justin Marks) and James Matador, with Tara Ferguson replacing J-Dog in season 2. The first season featured eight male contestants that had previously been unsuccessful in love and relationships. Throughout the show the contestants are tutored in the art of the "pickup" as taught by Mystery and his wings. In each episode the men were given challenges that involved picking women up in different situations, such as on a bridge during the day or in a nightclub. As the show progressed the men were instructed to pick up women of varying levels of difficulty, such as in the second to last challenge of the first season where the men had to pick up a stripper, described by Mystery as "the ultimate challenge." The winner of the first season was Alvaro "Kosmo" Orlando.

The second season featured nine contestants and aired in October 2008, with the second season's winner being 27-year-old Simeon Moses.

== Seasons ==
Season	Premiere date	Finale date	Winner	Runner-up	Location
1	August 6, 2007	September 24, 2007	Alvaro "Kosmo" Orlando	Brady Sprunger	Austin, Texas
2	October 12, 2008	November 30, 2008	Simeon Moses	Matt Radmanovich	Phoenix, Arizona

=== Season One ===
==== Contestants ====
Season 1 Cast

Name	Age	Status/Reason on Show	Eliminated
Kosmo (Alvaro Orlando)	23	Freezes up around women	Winner
Brady	25	Lacking in self-confidence	7th
Joe D.	25	The "friend" to girls	6th
Pradeep	22	Overanalyzes and talks too much	5th
Joe W.	24	Starts off strong but often fails fast	4th
Scott	26	Gets very nervous and stutters around women	3rd
Fred	45	40-year-old virgin, plus 5	2nd
Spoon (Steven Poon)	27	Does not know how to approach women	1st

==== Episode progress ====
Call-out Order
#	Episode							
#	1	2	3	4	5	6	7	8
1	Kosmo	Joe D.	Joe W.	Kosmo	Pradeep	Kosmo	Brady	Kosmo
2	Brady	Brady	Kosmo	Joe D.	Kosmo	Brady	Kosmo	Brady
3	Fred	Kosmo	Pradeep	Joe W.	Joe D.	Joe D.	Joe D.	
4	Joe D.	Joe W.	Joe D.	Brady	Brady	Pradeep		
5	Joe W.	Scott	Scott	Pradeep	Joe W.			
6	Pradeep	Pradeep	Brady	Scott				
7	Scott	Fred	Fred					
8	Spoon	Spoon						

The contestant won immunity.
The contestant was chosen as a wingman and had immunity.
The contestant was eliminated.
The contestant quit the competition.
The contestant won the title of the Pickup Artist.

- Note 1: Episode 1 had no elimination.
- Note 2: Alvaro changed his name to Kosmo in Episode 2.
- Note 3: Contrary to statements made earlier in the episode, no wing men were allowed to be selected in Episode 5.
- Note 4: Episode 8 was a recap episode.

=== Season Two ===
==== Contestants ====
Season 2 Cast

Name	Age	Also Known As	Status/Reason for coming on the show	Episode Eliminated
Simeon Moses	27	The High-Pitched Hottie	Cried when his girlfriend dumped him	Winner
Matt Radmanovich	26	The guy with foot in his mouth	Flew across the country and his girlfriend dumped him upon arrival	Episode 8
Greg Fellows	26	The Loner	Has not had a date in 5 years	Episode 7
Rian Turner	28	Patron Saint of the Overlooked	A virgin who has not even had a girlfriend	Episode 6
Brian Ly	21	The guy who kissed a girl	Kissed a girl	Episode 5
Todd Pabst	26	The Girl's Best Friend	Has had sex	Episode 4
Karl Meyer	21	The Brokenhearted Kid	His only girlfriend broke up with him and broke his heart	Episode 3
Kevin Feng	21	Strike-out King	The only girlfriend he has ever had cheated on him	Episode 2
Alex William Shelley	22	Women think he's gay	Virgin, lives with his parents	Episode 1

==== Episode Progress ====
Call-out Order
#	Episode							
#	1	2	3	4	5	6	7	8
1	Brian	Brian	Greg	Rian	Simeon	Matt	Simeon	Simeon
2	Greg	Greg	Matt	Brian	Matt	Simeon	Matt	Matt
3	Karl	Todd	Brian	Matt	Greg	Greg	Greg	
4	Kevin	Rian	Todd	Simeon	Rian	Rian		
5	Matt	Matt	Simeon	Greg	Brian			
6	Rian	Simeon	Rian	Todd				
7	Simeon	Karl	Karl					
8	Todd	Kevin						
9	Alex							

The contestant won immunity.
The contestant was chosen as a wingman and had immunity.
The contestant was eliminated.
The contestant won the title of the Pickup Artist.

== Reception ==
The initial viewer ratings were disappointing, debuting with only 673,000 viewers. Viewer ratings picked up by the season's end, resulting in the series being picked up for a second season.

Critical reception for the series was mixed, with The A.V. Club panning the second season's opening episode.

== Controversy ==
Controversy began after revelations that some of the contestants' livelihoods were not as they were listed on the VH1 show profiles. Alvaro "Kosmo" Orlando had been referred to as a game programmer, but he actually had been an aspiring actor for the previous four years - working out of Miami, New York, and Los Angeles. Runner-up contestant Brady Sprunger was characterized as a shy photographer, but he had been working for a modeling agency, the Los Angeles-based Action Agency, for five full years prior to the show's taping.

== See also ==
- Keys to the VIP
