= Emergency: This Book Will Save Your Life =

Book by Neil Strauss

- Author: Neil Strauss
- Illustrator: Bernard Chang
- Cover artist: Todd Gallopo
- Language: English
- Subject: Survivalism
- Publisher: HarperCollins (US); Canongate (UK)
- Publication date: March 10, 2009 (US); April 2, 2009 (UK)
- Publication place: United States
- Media type: Print (Paperback)
- Pages: 418 p.
- ISBN: 0-06-089877-1 (US); ISBN 1-84767-527-1 (UK)
- LC Class: PN (US); HV (UK)

Emergency: This Book Will Save Your Life (published as Emergency : One Man's Story Of A Dangerous World And How To Stay Alive In It by Canongate) is a 2009 book on survivalist preparedness by Neil Strauss. In the book, the author gains citizenship of the island nation of St. Kitts, visits a ranch called Gunsite to learn to shoot, and learns techniques for tracking and surviving in the wilderness. Comics are used as illustrations throughout the book, detailing survival techniques.

The book culminates with author responding to the disaster site of 2008 Chatsworth train collision as an emergency search and rescue team member.

== See also ==
- Survival kit
- Survival skills
