= Everyone Loves You When You're Dead =

2011 book by Neil Strauss

Everyone Loves You When You're Dead: Journeys into Fame and Madness
- First edition
- Author: Neil Strauss
- Language: English
- Genre: Non-fiction
- Publisher: It Books
- Publication date: March 15, 2011
- Publication place: United States

Everyone Loves You When You're Dead: Journeys into Fame and Madness is a book by the American author Neil Strauss released on March 15, 2011. A New York Times bestseller, the book is a compilation of more than 200 interviews from the author's career as a pop culture journalist.

To construct the book, Strauss visited his original interview recordings, notes, and transcripts and selected the often unpublished moments from the three thousand-something interviews conducted for various periodicals.
