= Wingman (social) =

Role in social psychology defined as providing assistance in courtship

Wingman (or wingmate) is a role that a person may take when a friend needs support with approaching potential romantic partners. People who have a wingman can have more than one wingman. A wingman is someone who is on the "inside" and is used to help someone with intimate relationships. In general, one person's wingman will help them avoid attention from undesirable prospective partners or attract desirable ones, or both.

== Original military use ==
The term originated in combat aviation in various English-speaking military aviation communities, attested from 1946, shortly before the advent of fighter jets. Pilots flying in formation, especially when in combat training or in actual aerial combat, refer to the pilot immediately next to them (traditionally on their right, sometimes on either side) as their "wingman" (the man on their wing). In aerial combat pilots are often trained to attack and defend in pairs watching out for each other.

== In sociology ==
In 2007, sociologist David Grazian interviewed male students at the University of Pennsylvania on their dating habits, and postulated that the wingman role was part of collective "girl hunt" rituals that allow young men to collectively exhibit masculinity. Grazian writes:

"the wingman serves multiple purposes: he provides validation of a leading man's trustworthiness, eases the interaction between a single male friend and a larger group of women, serves as a source of distraction for the friend or friends of a more desirable target of affection, can be called on to confirm the wild (and frequently misleading) claims of his partner and, perhaps most important, helps motivate his friends by building up their confidence. Indeed, men describe the role of the wingman in terms of loyalty, personal responsibility and dependability, traits commonly associated with masculinity…"

== Popular usage ==
Popular media and informal discourse describe a situation in which a pair of friends are socialising together, approaching other pairs and groups while avoiding the awkwardness or perceived aggression of acting alone. The wingman strikes up conversation and proposes group social activities, providing their friend with a pleasant and unthreatening social pretext to chat or flirt with a particular attractive person. The wingman can also keep their friend safe by preventing them from behaving in a reckless or socially embarrassing way.

The wingman can occupy the attention of any less attractive people in the other group, allowing their friend to express an interest in the most attractive group member.

Despite the name, wingmen are not exclusively male; women can also act as wingmen. Wingmen also do not necessarily share their friend's sexual orientation; gay people can be wingmen for straight friends, and vice versa.

Certain sources describe the wingman role as a part of pickup artistry, with women referred to as "targets" and men as "pilots". Others highlight the ability of a wingman (of any gender) to step in and rescue their female friend from unwanted persistent sexual advances.

American entrepreneur Thomas Edwards founded a dating service called The Professional Wingman, in which he performs the wingman role for socially reticent clients, coaching them on the social skills needed to approach potential romantic partners in bar settings. Edwards emphasises that he is not a pick-up artist.

== In fiction and popular culture ==
The term wingman was popularised by its use in the 1986 romantic military action drama film Top Gun, in which US Navy pilots are shown in a bar pursuing women in pairs, similar to their in-flight tactics. Nick "Goose" Bradshaw (Anthony Edwards) is the best friend and wingman to Pete "Maverick" Mitchell (Tom Cruise) in a social context, but is the cockpit partner (Weapon Systems Officer) in flight and not a wingman. At the end of the film, Maverick's former archrival, Tom "Iceman" Kazansky (Val Kilmer), shows his respect to Maverick when he says, "You can be my wingman anytime." Other characters have been called wingmen in literature, film and popular culture.

== See also ==
- Bro Code
- Chaperone
- Sidekick
