= NEG =

NEG or neg is an abbreviation that may refer to:

- the IATA code for Negril Aerodrome in Jamaica
- Net energy gain
- Non-evaporable getter, in vacuum technology
- Negative (disambiguation)
- Negging, the giving of a backhanded compliment
- NEG Micon, now part of Vestas
- Nippon Electric Glass, a Japanese manufacturer
- National Energy Guarantee, Australia
- Neg Dupree, of Neg's Urban Sports
