= Rules of the Game (book) =

2007 book by Neil Strauss

- First UK edition
- Author: Neil Strauss
- Publisher: Canongate Books
- Publication date: 2007

Rules of the Game is a how-to book about dating and seduction published in 2007 by American writer Neil Strauss. A follow-up to his autobiographical work The Game: Penetrating the Secret Society of Pickup Artists, Rules of the Game was also a New York Times Best-Seller.

Rules of the Game was originally released as a two volume hardcover set. The first volume entitled "The Stylelife Challenge" consists of a 30-day instructional dating improvement program. The second section, "The Style Diaries" continues the tone of The Game and includes additional autobiographical stories from Strauss's involvement in the "pick-up" community. Later paperback printings incorporated a third section, "The Routines Collection," detailing scripts for successful interactions with women.
