= Neil Strauss =

American author and journalist (born 1969)

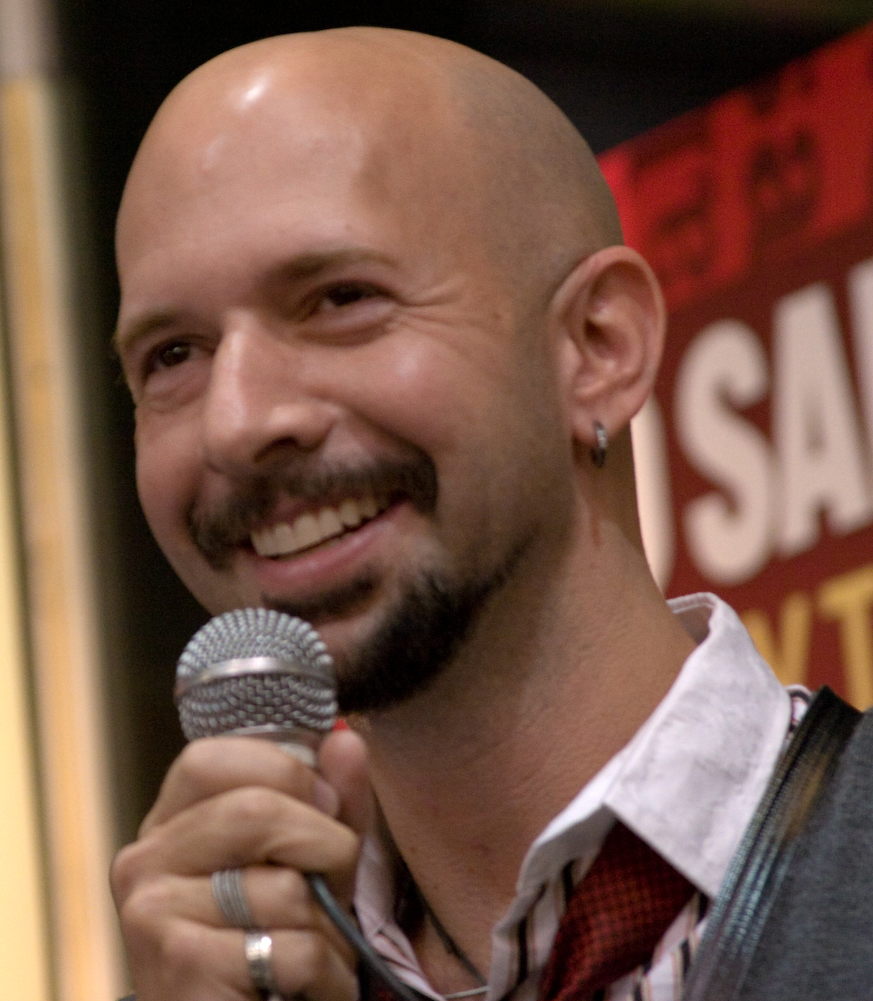
- Strauss in 2009
- Born: Neil Darrow Strauss; March 9, 1969 (age 57); Chicago, Illinois, U.S.
- Other names: Style; Chris Powles
- Education: Columbia University
- Occupations: Author; journalist
- Notable work: The Game: Penetrating the Secret Society of Pickup Artists
- Spouse: Ingrid De La O (m. 2013; div. 2018)
- Children: 1
- Website: neilstrauss.com

Neil Darrow Strauss (born March 9, 1969) also known by the pen names Style and Chris Powles, is an American author and journalist. His book The Game: Penetrating the Secret Society of Pickup Artists, describes his experiences in the seduction community in an effort to become a "pickup artist". He is a contributing editor at Rolling Stone and also wrote regularly for The New York Times.

== Early life ==
Strauss was born in Chicago, Illinois, on March 9, 1969. He is Jewish. Strauss graduated from the Latin School of Chicago in 1987, then briefly attended Vassar College before graduating from Columbia University in 1991 with a bachelor's degree in psychology.

== Career ==
=== Journalism ===
Strauss began writing for Ear, an avant-garde magazine, while still a student. He also edited his first book, Radiotext(e), an anthology of radio-related writings for the postmodern publisher Semiotext(e). He moved on to The Village Voice, working as a copyeditor and fact-checker before becoming a reporter and critic.

Strauss also wrote for The New York Times, Rolling Stone, Esquire, Maxim, Spin, Entertainment Weekly, Details, and The Source. He also contributed liner notes for Nirvana's With the Lights Out box set.

Strauss also co-authored two music memoirs: Marilyn Manson's The Long Hard Road Out of Hell (1998) and Mötley Crüe's The Dirt (2001).

=== The Game and the seduction community ===
In 2001, Strauss joined a subculture of pickup artists known as the seduction community. He published an article in The New York Times about his experiences in 2004 under the pseudonym Chris Powles. In 2005, he published The Game: Penetrating the Secret Society of Pickup Artists, a book about his transformation into "Style", an accomplished pickup artist under the tutelage of Mystery and Ross Jeffries, as well as his experiences with celebrities such as Courtney Love and Britney Spears.

The Game made a month-long appearance in The New York Times bestsellers list in September–October 2005, and reached the #1 position on Amazon.com immediately after its release in the United States, and Strauss appeared on television shows such as The View and ABC Primetime. It was optioned to be made into a film by Spyglass Entertainment, with Chris Weitz adapting and producing. After publishing the book, Strauss temporarily retired as a pickup artist to settle down with his girlfriend Lisa Leveridge.

In 2007, Strauss released a follow-up to The Game, Rules of the Game, a two-book boxed set. In 2012, he released a board game called Who's Got Game? The Game with Benefits.

Strauss is credited with popularizing the pick-up artist community and making its existence widely known. In 2015, he said the pickup community had "some really damaged people with hateful and distorted views of reality gathering other people who share those views", attracting people with "neurotic wounds" and with "character disorders", trying to find help and to change themselves. Strauss has continued to be involved with pickup artistry through his dating coaching company Stylelife Academy, founded in 2007. Most of the coaching is done by employed coaches, rather than Strauss himself, though he does make appearances at yearly conferences and in some video products sold by the company.

=== Later work ===
His follow-up book, the graphic novel How to Make Money Like a Porn Star, was published in 2006. The same year, Shoot, Strauss' short film about becoming a rock star, was released. Also in 2006, in collaboration with Dave Navarro and Entourage writer Cliff Dorfman, he created a one-hour TV drama The Product for FX. He also worked with James Gandolfini on a show, Roadies, for HBO.

On March 4, 2009, The New York Times wrote that Strauss (along with rock biographer Anthony Bozza) had started his own publishing company, Igniter, as an imprint of HarperCollins. Igniter's first title was The Man Behind the Nose, published in 2010. It was followed by Satan Is Real: The Ballad of the Louvin Brothers, published in 2012.

Strauss's 2009 book, Emergency: This Book Will Save Your Life (Harper), for which he spent three years among survivalists, tax-dodgers, billionaire businessmen, and the government itself. It entered The New York Times bestseller list at No. 3. He received the presidents Volunteer Service Award for his search-and-rescue work during the writing of Emergency. The rights to the movie were picked up by Columbia Pictures, with Robert Downey Jr. attached as a producer and probable lead actor.

Strauss's 2011 book Everyone Loves You When You're Dead: Journeys Into Fame and Madness was also a New York Times bestseller. Released on March 15, 2011, the book is a compilation of 228 celebrity vignettes conducted throughout Strauss's career as a pop culture journalist.

The Truth, the 2015 sequel to The Game, covers his struggles to build and maintain a relationship with Ingrid after his years of immersion in the seduction community. It was also a New York Times bestseller.

In June 2017, I Can't Make This Up: Life Lessons was published with co-author Kevin Hart and immediately was a #1 NY Times Bestseller.

In 2019, Strauss launched To Live and Die in LA., a true crime podcast following the death of Adea Shabani. It hit No. 1 on the iTunes podcasts, and was in the top 10 for four months.

On December 5, 2021, Strauss became the first mainstream author to mint a book on Ethereum titled Survive All Apocalypses: From Machine Uprisings to Bear Markets. On February 13, 2023, the Los Angeles County Museum of Art (LACMA) announced that it had acquired the book for its permanent collection.

In January 2023, The Creative Act: A Way of Being, a book that Strauss wrote with music producer Rick Rubin, was released and entered the New York Times Bestseller list at No. 1 on February 5.

== Personal life ==
In 2013, Strauss married model Ingrid De La O after a three year courtship, holding a funeral-themed bachelor party to lay his "Style" persona to rest. In 2015, De La O gave birth to their child, and the couple divorced in 2018.

== Bibliography ==
- The Long Hard Road Out of Hell with Marilyn Manson (1998) ISBN 0-06-098746-4
- The Dirt with Mötley Crüe (2001) ISBN 0-06-098915-7
- How to Make Love Like a Porn Star: A Cautionary Tale with Jenna Jameson (2004) ISBN 0-06-053909-7
- Don't Try This at Home: A Year in the Life of Dave Navarro – with Dave Navarro (2004)
- The Game: Penetrating the Secret Society of Pickup Artists (2005) ISBN 0-06-055473-8
- How to Make Money Like a Porn Star, illustrated by Bernard Chang (2006) ISBN 0-06-088405-3
- Rules of the Game (2007) ISBN 0-06-154045-5
- Emergency: This Book Will Save Your Life (2009) ISBN 0-06-089877-1
- Everyone Loves You When You're Dead: Journeys Into Fame and Madness (2011) ISBN 0-06-154367-5
- The Truth: An Uncomfortable Book About Relationships (2015) ISBN 978-0060898762
- I Can't Make This Up: Life Lessons with Kevin Hart (2017)
- Survive All Apocalypses: From Machine Uprisings to Bear Markets (2021) ISBN 979-8885260824
- The Creative Act: A Way of Being with Rick Rubin (2023)
