= The Game: Penetrating the Secret Society of Pickup Artists =

2005 non-fiction book by Neil Strauss

- Author: Neil Strauss
- Illustrator: Bernard Chang
- Language: English
- Publisher: ReganBooks
- Publication date: September 2005
- Publication place: United States
- Pages: 452 p.
- ISBN: 0-06-055473-8
- OCLC: 61464341
- Dewey Decimal: 973.7/447092 22
- LC Class: HV6584 .S77 2005
- Followed by: The Truth: An Uncomfortable Book About Relationships

The Game: Penetrating the Secret Society of Pickup Artists (also known as The Game: Undercover in the Secret Society of Pickup Artists) is a 2005 non-fiction book written by investigative reporter Neil Strauss as a chronicle of his journey and encounters in the seduction community.

The book was featured on The New York Times Bestseller List for two months after its release in September 2005, reaching prominence again in 2007 during the broadcast of the VH1 television series The Pickup Artist, which was hosted by Mystery, Strauss's mentor in the book. In its original published hardcover format, the book was covered in black leather and bookmarked with red satin, similar to some printings of the Bible. Despite the reputation that The Game has gained as an exposé on the seduction community, it was primarily written as an autobiographical work. The follow-up book, Rules of the Game, relies more on the how-to side of seduction and dating.

== Summary ==
Strauss stumbles across the community while working on an article. Intrigued by the subculture, he starts participating in the online discussion groups, mainly out of frustration with his own romantic life. As he becomes more and more involved in the romantic community, Strauss attends a bootcamp conducted by a man identified only as "Mystery". The bootcamp consists of Strauss and other participants approaching women, and then Mystery and his counterpart, Sin, giving them corrective advice on their behaviors, body language, and what to say. Strauss learns habits that, as he sees it, are often basic—and should have been taught to him by society in the first place.

The book then narrates the journey of how Strauss goes through the stages of becoming a pickup artist (a description of the members of the community) and gains the pseudonym "Style". He befriends many of the pickup artists, particularly Mystery. A good deal of the book focuses on how to obtain the elusive upper hand, or just hand, in a relationship. Strauss advocates various methods, mostly from the point of view of heterosexual men. He offers further guidelines for the process of seduction, which include preparing things to say before going out and telling groups of women surreptitiously impressive stories. He also uses "false time constraints" (a reason that the conversation could end very soon) to put the woman of interest in a situation where she must convince the man she is interesting, discusses how to very slowly increase the amount of physical contact, and more.

Strauss tells the story of his success, the spreading of the romantic community itself, and his life at "Project Hollywood", a high-end mansion and a lifestyle plan shared by Strauss, Mystery, Playboy, Papa, Tyler Durden, Herbal, and other members of the seduction community. He details how rivalries and animosity between members of the community lead to Project Hollywood's collapse and documents the start of "Real Social Dynamics" led by Tyler Durden and Papa. By the end of his story, Strauss concludes that a life of nothing but picking up women is "for losers", and he advocates incorporating pickup artist methods into a more balanced life.

Strauss mentions his experiments with sleeping habits, personal grooming tips, and encounters with celebrities such as Scott Baio, Tom Cruise, Andy Dick, Paris Hilton, Courtney Love, Dennis Rodman, and Britney Spears.

== Reception ==
Neil Strauss was quoted in a review by Steven Poole in The Guardian as saying, "A side effect of sarging (socializing with the intent of finding and seducing a woman) is that it can lower one's opinion of the opposite sex", though the reviewer noted, "And yet, as he has described it, the inverse is true: a low opinion of the opposite sex is a prerequisite for sarging." Strauss was also quoted as saying, "The point was women; the result was men. Instead of models in bikinis lounging by the Project Hollywood pool all day, we had pimply teenagers, bespectacled businessmen, tubby students, lonely millionaires, struggling actors, frustrated taxi drivers, and computer programmers—lots of computer programmers." The reviewer remarked that "The sell is that, with the special techniques they learn from Mystery and other gurus, the ubergeeky can often give a convincing simulation of being a regular human being, even if, like one sarger in this book, they are in fact near-sociopaths."

Rafael Behr in The Observer wrote, "Some of the recommended techniques are sinister. One involves discreetly undermining a woman's self-esteem by paying her a backhanded compliment in the hope that she will hang around to seek your approval. This maneuver has its own name: 'the Neg'."

Malcolm Knox wrote, "I doubt he has anything helpful for anyone except those men whose emotional maturity stalled at age 15." He also wrote, "If the reader is too far ahead of the author, a book has a problem. On page 406, Mystery's mother says his problems are caused by his low self-esteem. Strauss reflects: 'Only a mother could reduce a person's entire ambition and raison d'être to the one basic insecurity fueling it all.' No. It's taken 406 pages for Strauss to realize what most readers will have got by page 10." He notes the failure of Project Hollywood and the fact that the book does not recognize the role of women in selecting partners. He also writes, "The other false advertisement is that Strauss has 'penetrated' a 'secret society' of geeks-turned-gurus including Mystery, his rival Ross Jeffries and renegade PUA (pickup artist) teachers nicknamed Papa and Tyler Durden. Yet when Strauss writes about them in The New York Times, they're thrilled."

Alexandra Jacobs wrote in The New York Times that Strauss "switched awkwardly between misogynistic comments and feeble attempts at self-awareness." She also notes that "he does come to perceive one curious thing about the PUA's: They seem far more interested in spending time with fellow PUA's, amassing, refining and discussing the game, than actually getting to know women. Call them SLB's (scared little boys)."

== Film adaptation ==
In 2006, Sony optioned the film rights, with comedy director Chris Weitz reported to be signing on to helm the project for Columbia Pictures. The film rights eventually shifted to Spyglass Entertainment, and as of 2011 the film is under development by MGM, with Brian Koppelman and David Levien rewriting a previous script by Dan Weiss. In 2016 James Franco was attached to produce the movie, and to play the role of Mystery.

== Other works ==
A companion to The Game, called Rules of the Game, by Neil Strauss, containing two parts, "The Stylelife Challenge" and "The Style Diaries", was released on December 18, 2007.

Neil Strauss published a follow-up autobiographical work, The Truth: An Uncomfortable Book About Relationships, in 2015. The book was published in a similar format to The Game, and features a contrasting white imitation leather cover. Provisionally titled Game Over, it focuses on Strauss's difficulties with long-term relationships, following his immersion in pickup.
