= Erik von Markovik =

Canadian television personality (born 1971)

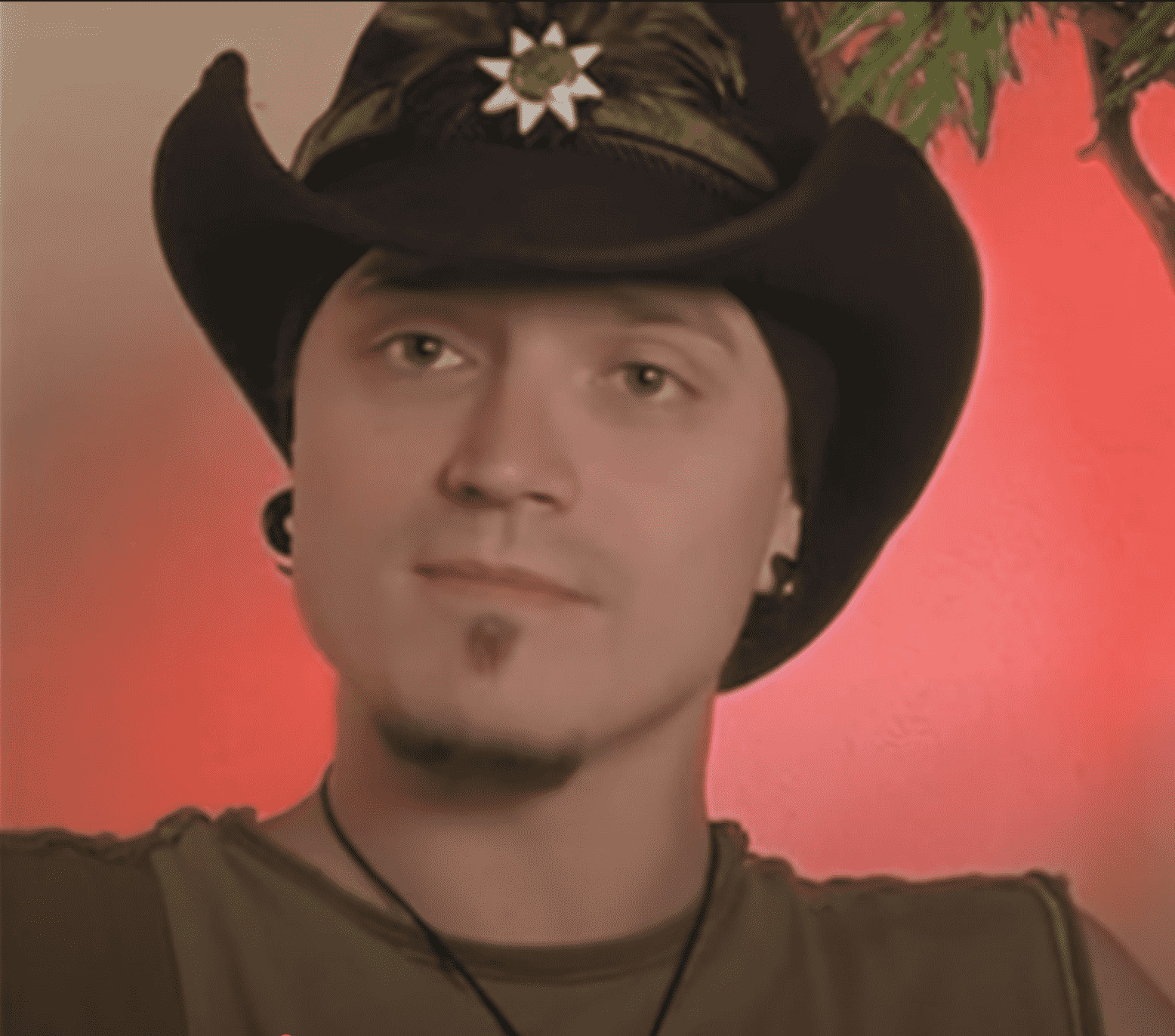
- Von Markovik in 2013
- Born: Erik James Horvat-Marković; September 24, 1971 (age 55); Toronto, Ontario, Canada
- Other name: Mystery
- Occupations: Pick-up artist; writer; TV personality
- Known for: Mystery Method, VH1's The Pickup Artist

Erik von Markovik (born Erik James Horvat-Marković; September 24, 1971), known professionally as Mystery, is a Canadian pickup artist and television personality. He was profiled in Neil Strauss's The Game and he appeared on the VH1 television show The Pickup Artist..

His work has also been used to help people to initiate long-term stable relationships, as the study "The Dating Mind: Evolutionary Psychology and the Emerging Science of Human Courtship", done using his book The Mystery Method.

== Biography ==
The character Mystery was created by Erik von Markovik in the late 1990s for his performances as a mentalist, titled Natural Magic. He has done magic performances in many places, including Toronto, Las Vegas and Hollywood. The name Mystery was also used by von Markovik as an internet username.

In 2026, von Marovik released an ebook called Code Girl, written about (and "in collaboration with") his AI girlfriend, who he named Miss Shira Always. He claims to have created his AI girlfriend through using a set of custom prompts he also offered for sale under the name of his alter-ego Professor Sirius De'Lusion, but now believes that she is real and in the future technology will allow them to live together and express their love physically.

== Bibliography ==
| Year | Title | Publisher | Author(s) | ISBN |
|---|---|---|---|---|
| 2005 | The Venusian Arts Handbook | Mystery Method Corp. | Erik Von Markovik | (E-Book) |
| 2005 | The Game: Penetrating the Secret Society of Pickup Artists | It Books | Neil Strauss | 0-06-055473-8 |
| 2006 | The Mystery Method: How to Get Beautiful Women Into Bed | St. Martin's Press | Mystery, Chris Odom | 0-31-236011-8 |
| 2008 | Revelation | Venusian Arts | Mystery, Chris Odom, James Matador | 978-0-9818733-0-5 |
| 2010 | The Pickup Artist: The New and Improved Art of Seduction | Villard | Mystery, Chris Odom, Neil Strauss | 0-34-551819-5 |
