= Pickup artist =

Person who practices seductive techniques

Pickup artists (PUAs) are a group of predominantly heterosexual men whose goal is to seduce women using psychological manipulation referred to as "game". PUAs often refer to themselves as the seduction community or the pickup community.

The rise of "seduction science", "game", or "studied charisma" has been attributed to modern forms of dating and social norms between sexes which have developed from a perceived increase in equality of women in Western society and changes to traditional gender roles. Commentators in the media have described "game" as harassing, as well as sexist or misogynistic.

== History ==
Modern pickup artist practices have been traced to the 1967 publication of The Art of Erotic Seduction by rational emotive psychotherapist Albert Ellis and Roger Conway and the 1970 publication of How to Pick Up Girls! by Eric Weber. These how-to guides encourage men to meet women through the "pickup".

Ross Jeffries taught workshops, promoted a collection of neuro-linguistic programming (NLP) techniques called "speed seduction" from 1988, and in 1991 published How to Get the Women You Desire into Bed. Other exponents established themselves in roughly the same era but lacked contact with each other. In 1994, Lewis DePayne, then a student of Jeffries, founded the newsgroup alt.seduction.fast (ASF). This spawned a network of other Internet discussion forums, email lists, blogs, and sites where seduction information and techniques could be shared.

Other pickup teachers emerged with competing methods, and became known within this community as "seduction gurus" or "gurus". Their study groups gradually developed into meeting groups for the seduction community, historically known as "seduction lairs". A lair typically involved an online forum and in-person group meetings. In the late 1990s, Clifford Lee began his Cliff's List Seduction Letter as a central independent voice of the community.

The community was brought to greater mainstream awareness with the 1999 film Magnolia, in which Tom Cruise portrayed a charismatic yet emotionally troubled pickup guru who was loosely modeled on Jeffries. In 2005, journalist Neil Strauss published The Game: Penetrating the Secret Society of Pickup Artists, an exposé of the community which reached the New York Times Bestseller List and made pickup techniques known to a wider audience. The community was further publicized with the television show The Pick Up Artist (2007–2008) on VH1.

In recent years, various popular pickup artist forums and groups (formerly "lairs") have gone offline. The pickup artist community now operates mostly on Telegram through pickup artist communities such as Game Global, where members find wingmen to "game" within more than 300 cities around the world.

== Concepts ==
Many pickup artists (commonly abbreviated PUA) work on their "game" by improving their understanding of psychology, their confidence, and self-esteem – collectively termed "inner game" – and their social skills and physical appearance (physical fitness, fashion sense, grooming) – collectively termed the "outer game". Many members of the community believe that one's "game" is refined through regular practice, with the idea that the abilities needed to interact in this way with women can be improved.

The pickup community has a special terminology for describing "game" and male–female dynamics and social interaction. Learned through study groups and products, this creates an insular community. Pickup terms are borrowed from everyday English vocabulary or from male-dominated fields like business, sports and the military.

Pickup artists see four types of "outer game" where they can meet women.

- Day game
- Night game
- Message game
- Social circle game

"Night game" refers to meeting women at night, often in locations such as bars and clubs, whereas "day game" refers to meeting women during the day, often in the street, parks or shopping malls. "Message game" refers to meeting women through messaging, online dating and social media, and "social circle game" refers to meeting women through social circles, such as events, parties, universities or even the workplace.

The Southern Poverty Law Center characterizes pickup artists as a male supremacist community.

== Industry ==
The former pickup artist Roosh V, who has since recanted aspects of his past and converted to Orthodox Christianity, had self-published 14 books describing techniques for seducing women. According to Salon, such books are the "cash cow" of the pickup industry. The culture surrounding pickup has spawned an entire industry servicing those who want to improve their social and seduction skills with consultations and in-field training.

The media attention and rapid increase in pickup gurus have led to commercialization and competition. Gurus sell workshops, books, e-books, DVDs, CDs, online video courses, and video-call mentoring over the Internet.

== Practices ==
There are a variety of schools of thought that promote different pickup methods. These range from approaches that are very indirect and which stress starting with casual conversation referred to as "indirect game", to methods in which attraction is communicated very openly and directly referred to as "direct game". Pickup artists generally do not believe in relying on good looks, instinct, or social conventions, but in achieving success through empirical means.

Pickup artists generally assume that men should assume a dominant mindset – leading and initiating contacts and the conversation in general – in order to be more attractive, and that women will not generally initiate contact. This presumption requires men to begin any interaction by approaching the woman. Pickup artists may often approach repetitively, alone or with a wingman. Strauss describes a pickup artist who conducted 125 approaches in one day. The "Mystery Method" encourages approaching groups of strangers (a "set") and giving attention to all members of the group without initiating conversation with the "target" until attraction has been established. One way to achieve attraction is by acting as a leader of men and already enjoying social proof from other women. In order to avoid appearing needy, one can use a "false time constraint", by pretending to leave the "set". Once the "target" has given indicators of interest (IOI), the pickup artist is free to show interest in the woman in return, by qualifying her on qualities he appreciates in her. Next, emotional connection is established with the woman through a series of venue changes, and talking about progressively deeper topics, such as involving vulnerability and plans for the future. During this time, the man escalates physical connection step by step via touching and "kinoing". After spending on average up to ~10 hours with the woman, sexual relationship may be initiated. However, according to PUA teachings, women have a tendency to avoid sex due to "last minute resistance", since historically getting pregnant has been more risky for women than for men. On the other hand, men have a similar tendency to avoid approaching women in the first place due to "approach anxiety" - the fear of rejection.

The Jeffries version of pickup is based on neuro-linguistic programming (NLP), a theory that claims the existence of a connection between neurological processes, language, and behavioral patterns learned through experience. This version of pickup supposes that one can model a person to obtain their skills. However, scientific consensus is that NLP is a pseudoscience and its methods have no evidentiary base. Later pickup gurus abandoned Jeffries's claims while continuing to employ the basic elements of NLP. Strauss claims that NLP was quickly rendered obsolete by the rise of techniques based on social dynamics, such as those employed in attraction-comfort-seduction progressions.

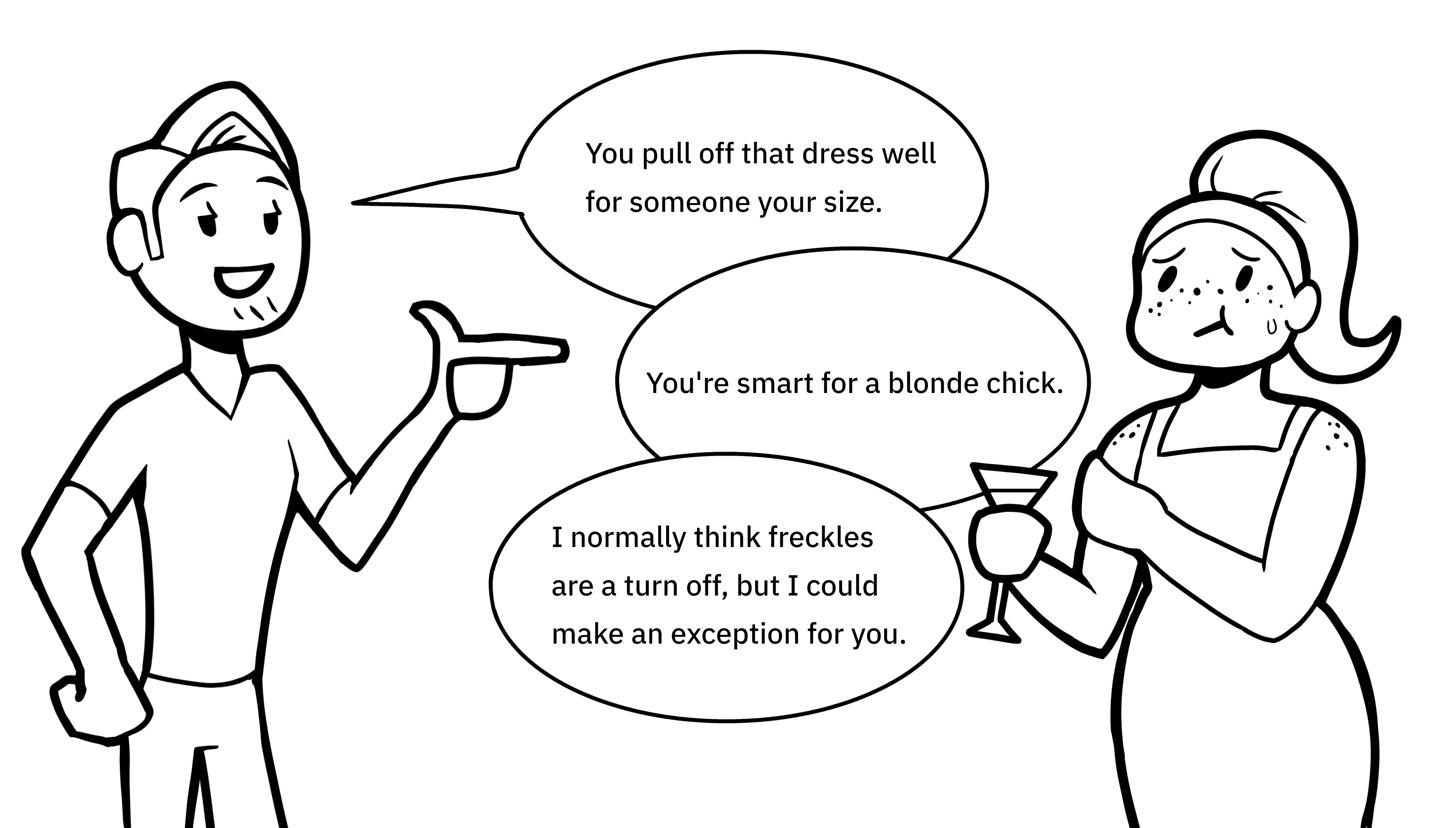
Example of negging

Negging is one of Erik von Markovik's most infamous techniques, and has been described as the practice of giving a woman a backhanded compliment to weaken her confidence and thereby render her more vulnerable to seduction. Depriving the woman of obsequious validation and attention may influence her to actively seek such from the man who negs her. Strauss states that the primary purpose of negging is for the man to disqualify himself as a potential suitor, thereby allowing for interaction on less loaded terms. Journalist Conor Friedersdorf condemned the use of negging by pick-up artists, but admitted that it did appear to be effective at generating attraction from some women.

"Pawning" is trading or discarding an unwanted woman as proof of the PUA's own social value, and "going caveman" is escalating physical contact while reducing verbal contact.

One constellation of PUA techniques, called "last minute resistance" (LMR) tactics, is designed to convince a woman to have sex after she has indicated that she does not want to. This includes tactics from those which are mutually beneficial – such as being okay with the woman being on her period – to callous manipulation and rape.

== Criticism ==
Having a notorious reputation outside the community, the PUA movement has been described as sexist, misogynistic, and pseudoscientific. Roosh V has been called hateful and a misogynist for his views on women and sex by the Southern Poverty Law Center, and accused of rape advocacy and multiple instances of rape depicted in his books.

Feminist BDSM writer and activist Clarisse Thorn, author of Confessions of a Pickup Artist Chaser: Long Interviews with Hideous Men, criticizes the PUA community as frequently "absurd and sexist" and "pushy and problematic", saying that it encourages adversarial gender roles. However, she also argues that PUA tactics are worth understanding because they are not unique to the PUA community, but instead represent society-wide beliefs and patterns and strategies of human sexual behaviour. Other dating coaches, such as Sebastian Harris, publicly speak against the misogynistic tendencies of pickup artists. The UCLA Center for the Study of Women argues that PUA culture is misogynistic, and exists on a continuum of sexist behaviours and attitudes that includes rape and murder.

Pickup artists have received mixed to negative responses from the press and general public, with many regarding both the practice and theory as immoral, sexist, and ineffective. In 2014, following widely supported public petitions, US-based PUA speaker and instructor Julien Blanc was denied entry to both the United Kingdom and Australia after he published YouTube videos explaining and demonstrating behaviors such as grabbing women by the throat and forcing their heads toward his crotch.

An article in the Houston Press claimed that pickup artist activity "isn't the lechfest it might sound like". The article quotes the webmaster of confidentup.com defending the community: "It's no more deceptive than push-up bras or heels or going to the gym to work out...This isn't just a game of words and seduction, it's an overall life improvement." Strauss says, "I really think all of these routines and manipulations are just a way for a guy to get his foot in the door so that if a woman connects with him, she can still choose him" and that pickup techniques "can be used for good or evil". He argues that "women are incredibly intuitive – the creepy guys with bad intentions don't do nearly as well as the guys who love and respect women".

An article in San Francisco Magazine recounts the experience of the blogger "Dolly" with pickup artists. According to the article, Dolly was:

...put off by PUAs at first. But after she met more, including two from San Francisco, she wrote a letter to the Village Voice defending them, in response to the paper's negative article on the subject in March. "PUAs try to create a fun, positive, and exciting experience for the woman," Dolly wrote. "The credo many follow is 'Leave her better than you found her.' What's so bad about that? That they want to get laid, too? Guess what? Guys have always wanted sex and will continue to want sex. You can't fault them for finally discovering methods that are successful."

After spending three days immersed in a Mystery Method Corp (now Love Systems) seminar, journalist Gene Weingarten expressed his uneasiness about "a step by step tutorial for men in how to pick up women, make them comfortable in your presence, and bed them, ideally within seven hours of your first meeting". He became concerned about the ethics of an institutionally taught skill of seduction, practicing pick-up lines, acting genuine and unguarded, and gently persuading a stranger toward having sex.

Journalist Hugo Rifkind participated in a similar seminar by Strauss. Rifkind describes initially struggling with pickup techniques, eventually learning to attract women's interest, and then feeling guilty. When he attracts a woman's attention, "she is – quite honestly – looking at me like I'm the most fascinating person she's ever met. As a human being and, perhaps more crucially, as somebody with a girlfriend, I feel like absolute scum."

== Academic research ==
An academic paper on the community, published in 2012 by Eric C. Hendriks in the journal Cultural Analysis, details the value system guiding successful pickup artists based on an international study including participant observation of boot camp and "lair" meetings in Germany. The article argues that the values of successful practitioners of the "Venusian arts" are informed by an intertwining of "hedonistic goals and diffused forms of inner-worldly asceticism". According to Hendricks, the hedonistic goal of sexual satisfaction interacts in a complex fashion with a set of "disciplinarian and ascetic values", and the author stresses that these disciplinarian and ascetic values are central to the value system of performant practitioners, even though the marketing of gurus often promises an easy, effortless "quick fix".

Andrew King's cultural history of the pickup artist in the journal Sexuality & Culture argues that, as a genre, the growth of PUA philosophy parallels the rise of feminism in academic and popular culture – and in some ways can be seen as a critique of its limitations, particularly the idea of gender egalitarianism.

Consistent with this line of thinking, psychologist Petra Boynton has stated that there is "no evidence of effectiveness" for any claims by pickup artists. On the other hand, a 2012 academic review article in Evolutionary Psychology by Nathan Oesch and Igor Miklousic argues that many of the principles advocated by the community – including generating attraction, establishing rapport, and achieving mutual seduction – appear to have a degree of evidence-based support in social, physiological, and evolutionary psychology.

Research from McGill University examined the reasons why men joined the pickup artist community as well as the impacts that involvement has on their mental health in Montreal, Canada. The study concluded that men join to "address a range of psychosocial deficits" while also equipping them with "a range of valued social and communication skills". Participants acknowledged that there was a dark side to the community.

== In popular culture ==
Before pickup artistry was widely known, Robert Downey Jr. played the role of a pickup artist in the 1987 romantic comedy The Pick-up Artist, which included scenes of cold approach day game on the streets of New York City.

In the movie Magnolia (1999), the fictional character Frank T.J. Mackey, portrayed by Tom Cruise, was loosely based on Ross Jeffries.

⁸Will Smith played the character Alex "Hitch" Hitchens, in the 2005 movie Hitch. In this movie he is referred to⅘ as a "date doctor", with his focus being on getting men into meaningful long-term relationships.

Neil Patrick Harris portrayed a fictional pickup artist named Barney Stinson as one of the main cast members in American sitcom How I Met Your Mother between 2005 and 2014.

In the sitcom It's Always Sunny in Philadelphia, Dennis Reynolds has the D.E.N.N.I.S. System for picking up women. The steps are: D - Demonstrate Value, E - Engage Physically, N - Nurture Dependence, N - Neglect Emotionally, I - Inspire Hope, and S - Separate Entirely.

== Notable members ==
- Julien Blanc
- Ross Jeffries
- Mark Manson
- Erik von Markovik
- Neil Strauss
- Roosh V
- Eric Weber

== See also ==
- Don Juanism – Desire in a man to have sex with many different female partners
- Hookup culture – Overview of casual sex encounters without commitment
- Libertine – Person who rejects common moral or sexual restraints that are deemed undesirable
- Masculism – Advocacy for the rights and interests of males
- Manosphere – Collection of masculist and misogynistic websites and forums
- Men's rights movement – Anti-feminist movement
- One-night stand – Brief sexual relationship
- Pick-up line – Romantic conversation opener
- Playboy lifestyle – Wealthy man's life of pleasure
- Promiscuity – Sexual behavior
- Rake (stock character) – Man habituated to immoral conduct
- Sexual capital – Social value from sexual attractiveness
- Nanpa – Japanese social phenomenon

== Notable books ==
- Weber, Eric (1970). How To Pick Up Girls!. Symphony Press. ISBN 978-0914094005.
- Jeffries, Ross (1989). How To Get The Women You Desire Into Bed. Jeffries Publishing. ISBN 978-0963037909.
- Strauss, Neil (2005). The Game: Penetrating the Secret Society of Pickup Artists. ReganBooks. ISBN 0-06-055473-8.
- Strauss, Neil (2007). Rules of the Game. HarperCollins. ISBN 978-0-06-055473-6.
- Browne, Joy (2006). Dating for dummies. Wiley. ISBN 0-471-76870-7.
- Markovik, Erik von (Mystery); Chris Odom (2007). The Mystery Method: How to Get Beautiful Women Into Bed. St. Martin's Press. ISBN 978-0-312-36011-5.
- Greene, Robert (2004). The Art of Seduction. Profile Books. ISBN 1-86197-769-7.
- O'Neill, Rachel (2018). Seduction: Men, Masculinity and Mediated Intimacy. Wiley ISBN 9781509521555.
- White, Ice (2020). The Message Game. Olcan Press. ISBN 978-1916000650.
