= Clipping (media) =

Practice of generating video clips

Clipping is the practice of generating specific short-form content from long-form content. Individuals who do clipping, known as clippers, can either do it as part of a fandom or as a profession. Originating in the 2010s, clipping became much more prominent in the 2020s as short-form content became the predominant form of social media consumption.

Clipping first emerged from livestreaming in the late 2010s, when creators such as Ninja would ask their fans to make highlight clips from their streams. As the rise of TikTok around the turn of the decade precipitated an explosion in the popularity of short-form content, clipped content became massively popular, often taken from not just streams, but podcasts, longer videos, and even movies and TV shows. By the mid-2020s, clipped content had become the predominant form of digital media consumption, accompanied by the rise of short-form platforms like YouTube Shorts and Meta's Reels. As a result, also by the mid-2020s, professional clipping had emerged as a burgeoning industry, with creators, brands, and celebrities using the practice as a means of self-promotion. Clipping's popularity as a promotional device has been attributed to it not being a form of traditional advertising, which provides benefits such as not having viewers skip over clipped media like they tend to do for content labeled as a paid advertisement, as well as being able to bypass certain restrictions on advertising for certain industries.

Coverage of clipping began to pick up in the mid 2020s, largely over its role in promoting controversial brands and individuals such as the cryptogambling site Stake and the American looksmaxxing influencer Clavicular. The term clip economy was termed by podcaster and analyst Ed Elson in April 2026 and describes the rise of clipping and clippers in digital media as a promotional device. Clipping's ability to disseminate info from longer media has made it a popular form of content for films, podcasts, and other long-form content. Clipped content has become particularly popular amongst younger generations who will often consume certain mass media IPs only through clips; several livestreamers such as Nick Fuentes, Clavicular, and Hasan Piker overwhelmingly draw most of their views from clips instead of their streams. Clipping has fallen under scrutiny for diverting attention away from original content, having unclear connections from original creators, and its association with controversial and legally-grey industries and individuals.

== Background and process ==
Since the rise of the internet around the turn of the 21st century and the subsequent mass proliferation of digital media, video clips have become a popular form of content online. The rise of social media sites such as YouTube helped mainstream them in the 2000s and 2010s, which was supplemented by other video-based apps such as Vine, Instagram, and TikTok. This occurred across a broader mainstreaming of short-form content starting in the late 2010s and early 2020s. Video clips online have often been defined by their amateurishness, with The Economist reporting in 2006 that over 90% of clips on YouTube were published by amateurs.

Clipping is practice of making short-form content from long-form content. This is often done via cutting clips from content such as podcasts, movies, interviews, livestreams, and TV shows. Although the practice of generating video clips was indistinguishable from video clips themselves, the term clipping largely entered into use in the late 2010s and 2020s to refer to the specific practice of generating clips from livestreams and other media and posting them online. Clipping in this context, although like earlier forms of clip generation still including amateur content creation, is often done by paid individuals who specialize in the art of clipping as a result of their popularity. They have also been adapted to fit the needs of short-form video platforms such as TikTok, Instagram Reels, or YouTube Shorts.

== Rise of clipping ==
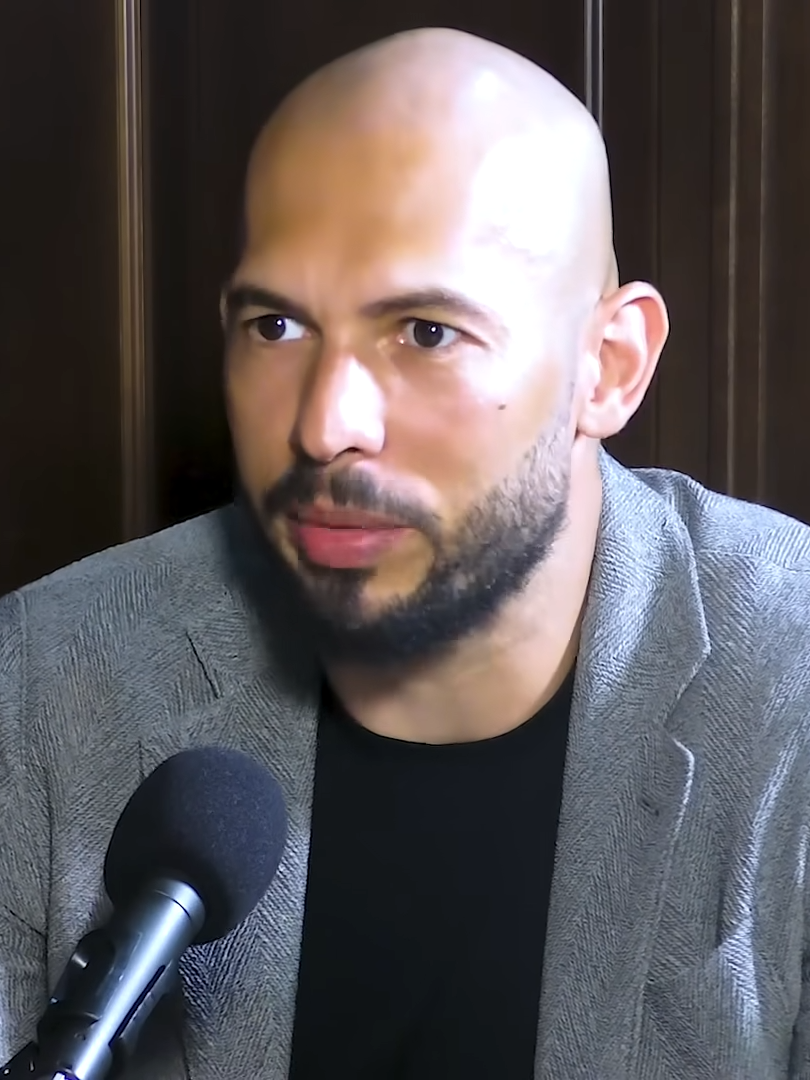
Andrew Tate, pictured in 2023, was an early adopter of contemporary clipping.

Clipping had already existed with livestreaming in the late 2010s, where excerpts from long streams would be made to illustrate key moments. Streamers such as the American Fortnite streamer Ninja would request their fans to make highlight clips from their streams so that they could share them with others. The emergence and popularity of TikTok in the late 2010s initiated the adoption of similar short-form content platforms by other social media sites such as Instagram, YouTube, X, and Facebook in the early 2020s. Such platforms, such as Shorts in the case of YouTube, and Reels in that of the first and last, compounded with TikTok, have enabled the proliferation of clips as the predominant form of digital media consumption by the mid 2020s.

The rise of short-form media saw clips naturally become prominent on these new platforms, with their short, often teaseresque manner making them a popular form of attracting attention to content creators, brands, or organizations. On short-form platforms, they fitted in with the other forms of content, and as such were effective at grabbing the attention of and conveying detailed and often complicated information to regular users scrolling on the apps. An early adopter of contemporary clipping was the British and American personality Andrew Tate, who used paid clippers to promote his Hustler's University and social views; following his mass-deplatforming in late 2022 due to his misogynistic remarks, his influence was able to remain in large part due to the attention generated by independent clippers of his content, who continued showcasing him afterwards.

Clipping in the context of short-form content involves making a video vertical if necessary, cutting up a larger piece of media, and putting captions. With the AI boom, artificial intelligence has become a bigger component of newer clipping, lowering the barrier of entry.

Many creators were able to garner popularity off clipping, with it often being the predominant reason for their relevance. For instance, many prominent livestreamers in fact have their media presence supported largely clips of their streams that have been posted on such streaming platforms like Twitch and Kick or other platforms. In an April 2026 interview with The Atlantic, Ed Elson noted that prominent streamers such as Hasan Piker, Nick Fuentes, and Clavicular typically held low concurrent viewership on their actual livestreams—often hovering in the low tens of thousands—but that their average clip viewership was around 700 thousand, 500 thousand, and 250 thousand respectively. Clavicular in particular, who experienced an explosion of prominence online in the preceding year, has had his rise been attributed to the effectiveness of clips of him posted online, with his clips on Kick garnering over 2 billion views, despite the fact this his streaming viewership was typically around 16 thousand. In the case of individuals such as Tate and Fuentes, who are often banned from these platforms, clipping enables their content to still be disseminated on them.

Aside from content creators online, clipping has also been used to benefit others seeking to draw attention to themselves. Films and TV shows such as Heated Rivalry, Sinners, One Battle After Another, Barbie, Project Hail Mary, Wuthering Heights, and Obsession have garnered virality and popularity in part to widely viewed clips online. Content from Amazon Prime and Netflix are often promoted via clips, with the former introducing a vertical feed of content known as "Clips" and the latter "Moments", where users could create clips from media as long as two minutes. Spotify also rolled out a clipping feature in May 2026, where segments of podcasts can be clipped and shared. In-built clipping mechanisms have even been extended to YouTube, which has planned to roll out clip suggestions targeting the most engaged parts of long-form videos.

== Promotional clipping ==
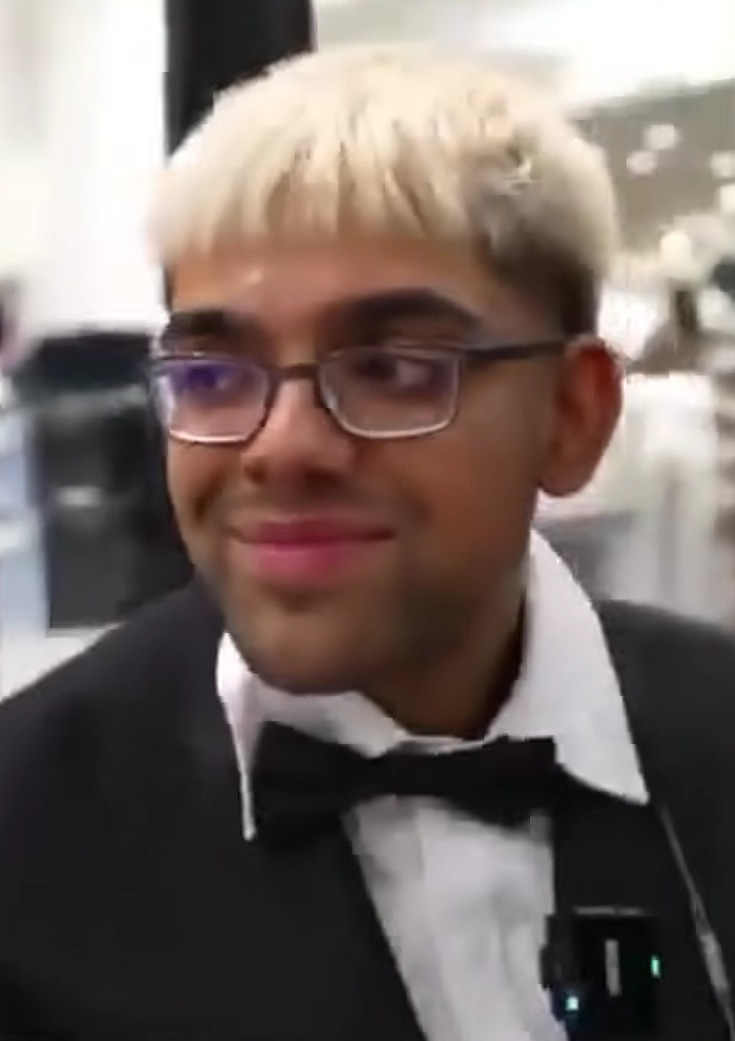
American streamer N3on claimed to pay his clippers $1 million monthly, with one in particularly receiving $100 thousand over that time period.

With clipping becoming a prominent form of media, clipping as a practice in of itself became a lucrative business by 2023, with creators often willing to pay hefty sums to clippers to help proliferate their content. Newer clipping are often professionalized, composing of individuals who often are not necessarily fans of the content creator and have a purely contractual relationship with them, often treating it as a side-hustle. Paid clipping has its advantages in being more cost-effective than traditional digital advertising; additionally, it can draw more effective engagement since viewers typically skip advertisements on social media apps. American livestreamer N3on has claimed to pay his clippers $1 million monthly altogether, with a particular clipper being paid $100 thousand. Individual payments on broad creator campaign sites will typically pay between $1 to $5 per thousand views, with some paying as little as $0.20. A clipping campaign as a whole could cost anywhere between $25,000 to $100,000 according to Shane Ginsberg, the CEO of a company that creates promotional content for brands such as Polymarket and MoonPay. In May 2026, The Star, a Malaysian English-language newspaper, reported that 93% of clippers on Kick were making clips for Clavicular; under a post highlighting this, he responded with "Viewmaxed". The rise of professional clipping had led to the development of clipping how-tos online, with the Indian Learn with Jaspal grew from thirty thousand subscribers in 2021 two million by the end of 2022, marketing himself as a clipper who had become successful and could educate others.

Various clipping agencies have emerged to capitalize on this rising industry. Such agencies are often founded by young adults, many of them in college, and connect advertisers and media creators to the clippers. Paid/agency clips often lean in more directly into the advertising side of clipping, featuring logos and watermarks. Paid clipping has often been used by crypto and fintech groups to promote their services, including crypto casinos, most notably Stake, which has engaged in what has been described as an unprecedented clip farming operation, paying aggregator accounts nearly $100 for uploading other peoples' memes and posts with their logo. The company swiftly amassed a large network of clippers via Discord, Whop, and various third-party clipping platforms; only accounts with 50 million or more monthly views could qualify so as to only contain established clip farmers. The network unraveled in December 2024 after a user on X infiltrated one of the Discord servers and exposed a coordinator who administered multiple accounts, including a purported anti-Stake parody account that in actuality was still on the company's payroll. The post on X garnered much attention, and the incident was followed by the dissolution of the network and Stake being barred form the British market in February 2025 by the country's Gambling Commission.

Fintech and crypto groups often use clipping since they are a way of getting around the bans most platforms have against financial and gambling advertising. This is the case for other legally-grey industries such as AI, gambling as a whole, and other black market industries. Clipping facilitated by paying individuals, organizations, or agencies also became more viable as YouTube and other platforms began reducing regular monetization from reused content.

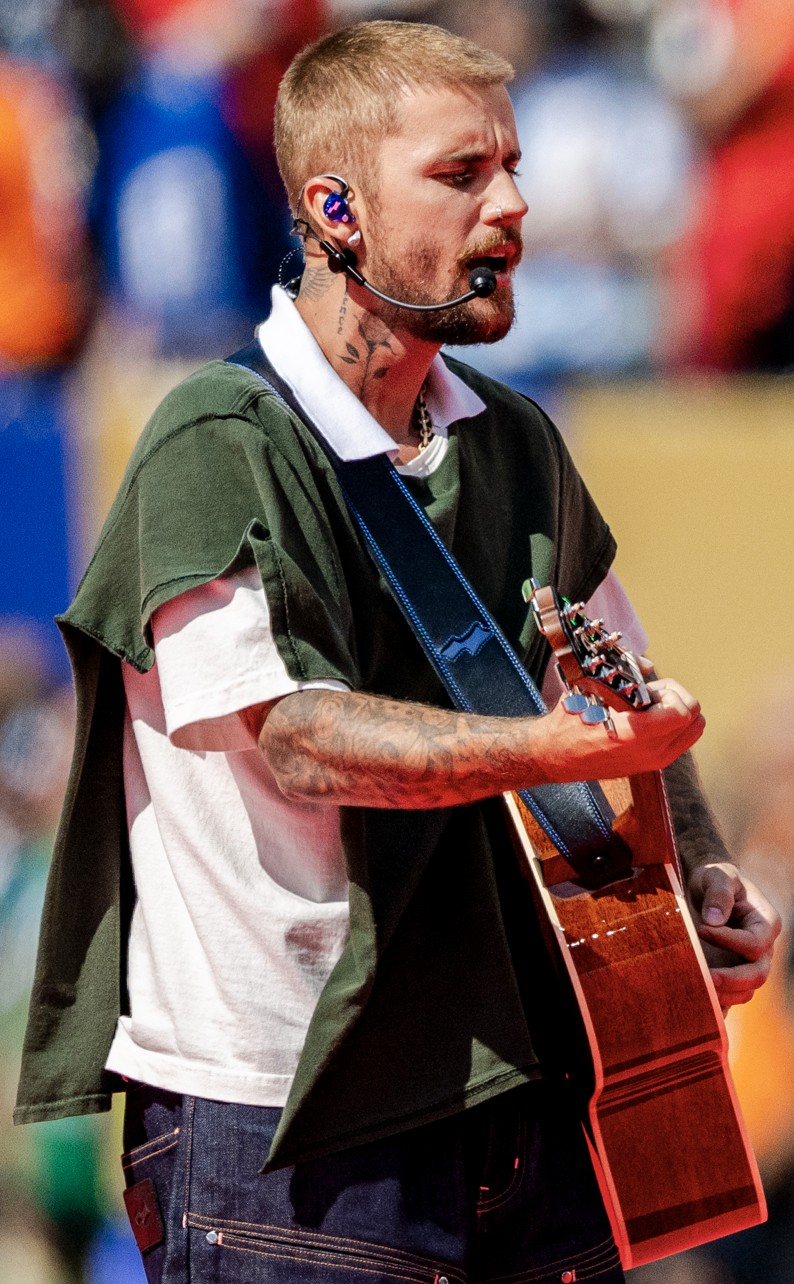
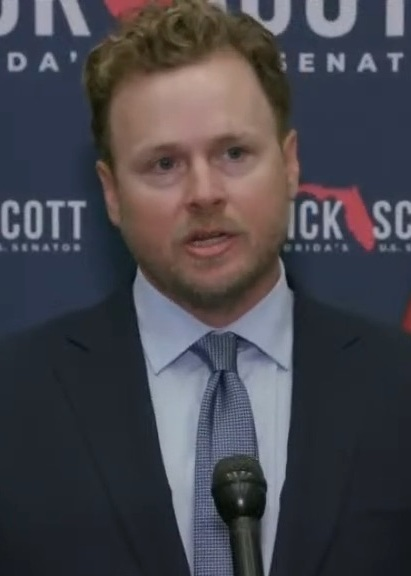
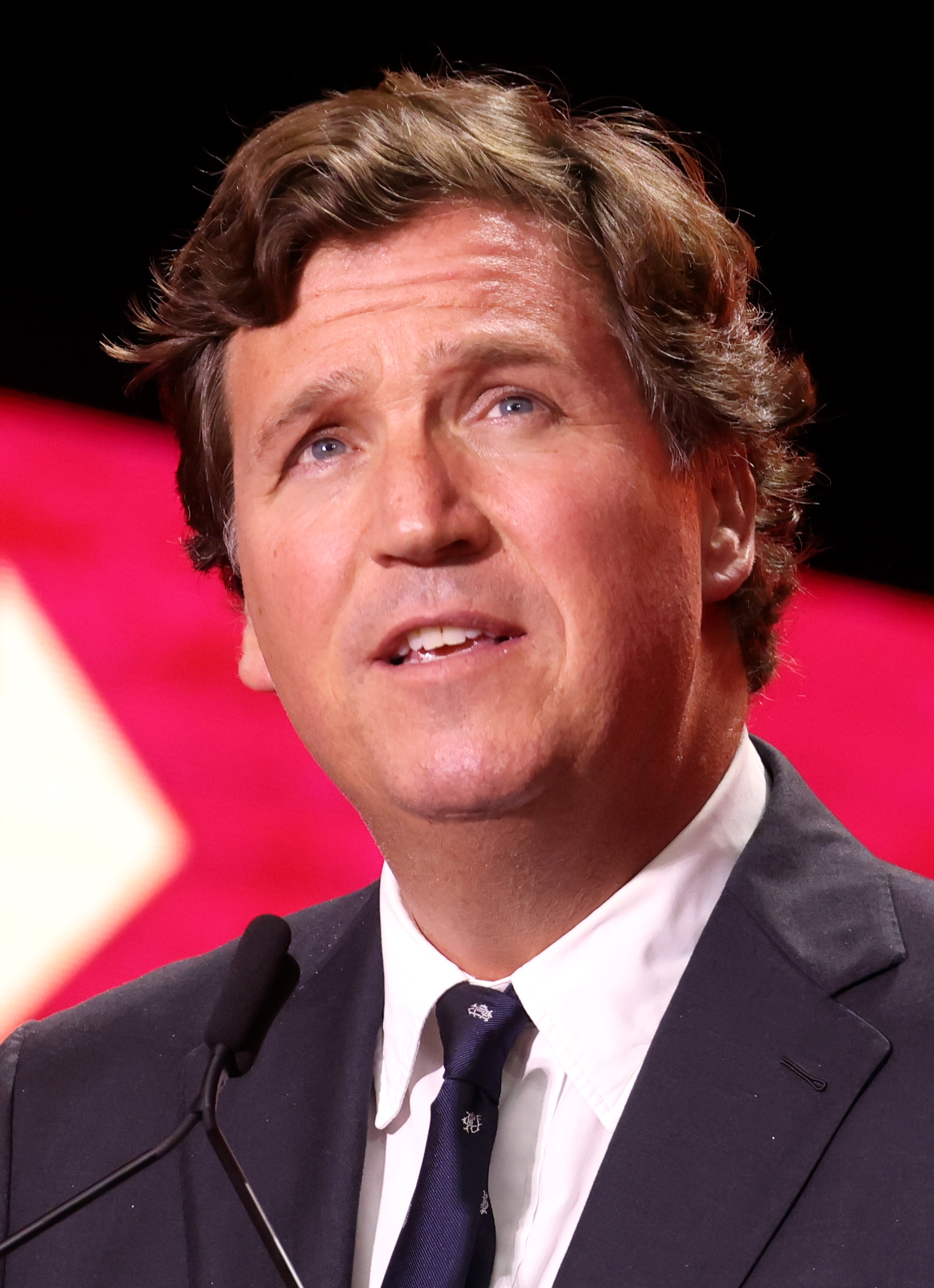
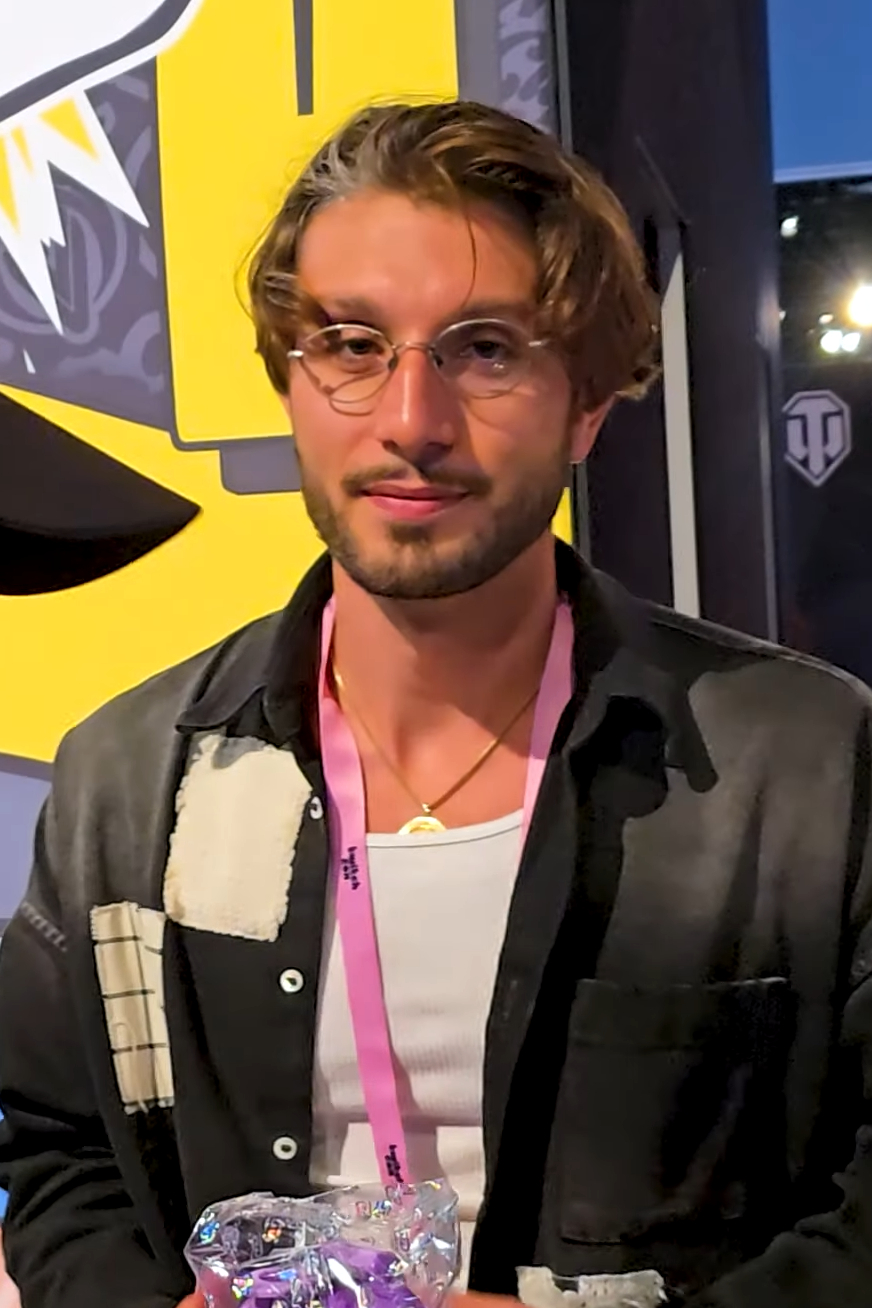
Canadian singer Justin Bieber, American mayoral candidate and reality TV star Spencer Pratt, Canadian rapper bbno$, and American political pundit Tucker Carlson (clockwise from top left) have all been boosted by clipping campaigns.

Celebrities in other media forms are also promoted via clips, often by groups such as United Talent Agency. In a June 2026 interview with NBC News, an executive at Capitol Records stated that record label uses it to promote artists such as Offset and Ice Spice. Other artists, such as Drake, John Summit, Black Sabbath, Yung Gravy, Ski Mask the Slump God, bbno$, the Rolling Stones, Bad Bunny, Zayn Malik, Fleetwood Mac, Shania Twain, Teddy Swims, Teyana Taylor, Luke Combs, Noah Kahan, Dominic Fike, Kane Brown, Russ, and PartyNextDoor, have also been boosted by clips. For musical artists, this can often be via playing their music on otherwise related videos; the American electronica artist John Summit saw his single "Lights go Out" garner success in part from a clipping campaign that had its top two clips being videos of the song playing over NBA games featuring Steph Curry and Michael Jordan. Clipping has proven to aid younger artists as well, with the American rapper Ian garnering mass virality through it. TV shows and movies have also been boosted by them, such as Logan and Jake Paul's HBO Max show Paul American, For All Mankind, Insidious: Out of the Further, the Michael Jackson biopic Michael, the Gen Z-centric sitcom Adults, RuPaul's Drag Race, The Sopranos, The Odyssey, Scary Movie and Anaconda. as well as brands and events such as Kalshi and the Met Gala.

Canadian artist Justin Bieber received an influx of attention and streams after he headlined two consecutive weekends at Coachella 2026, attributed in party by Lane Brown writing for New York magazine's Vulture to a large Discord clipping campaign. Irish media presenter Ryan Tubridy remarked that same month that people often knew his Bookshelf podcast exclusively via clips and recommended that the RTÉ's The Late Late Show, which he hosted until late 2023, adapt to the format. For TV shows and films, clipping has proved useful in an environment where 71% of Gen Z use short-form content to find media from both to watch. Political campaigns have also used clipping to great effect. Spencer Pratt, who launched a somewhat popular, but ultimately failed run for Mayor of Los Angeles in 2026, used clipping extensively throughout his campaign, forgoing any cable advertising, while the campaign for Michael Carbonara, a Florida Republican running for the 2026 GOP primary in the state's 22nd House district, outlined that clippers must not state anything "anti-Trump / anti-White House", but permitting AI-generated clips. Political clipping has also been done to promote The Tucker Carlson Show, The Megyn Kelly Show, and The Dan Bongino Show.

Some creators have formed their own clipping agencies. The most notable of them is Vyro, created by MrBeast, who paid out $100,000 to clippers in a particular campaign, often for content that was not even related to him or his brand. Vyro operates by using MrBeast's immense wealth and status as a method of legitimacy and crowdfunding. MrBeast had already used the agency Clipping, founded by Anthony Fujiwara, to generate clips of his own content, paying clippers $50 per 100 thousand views. American YouTuber Airrack also launched Clip Farm in August 2025, which claims Paul American as one of its clients. In addition to his Kick clippers, N3on claims that many of his 1,000 strong network of clippers as belonging to a group he and fellow streamer Adin Ross built.

In June 2026, The Wall Street Journal reported that backers including venture capital investors were moving to professionalize clipping in order to appeal to larger brands. Clouted, a clipping startup whose clients include Lionsgate Films, raised $7 million the previous month in a seed round led by Slow Ventures.

== Analysis ==
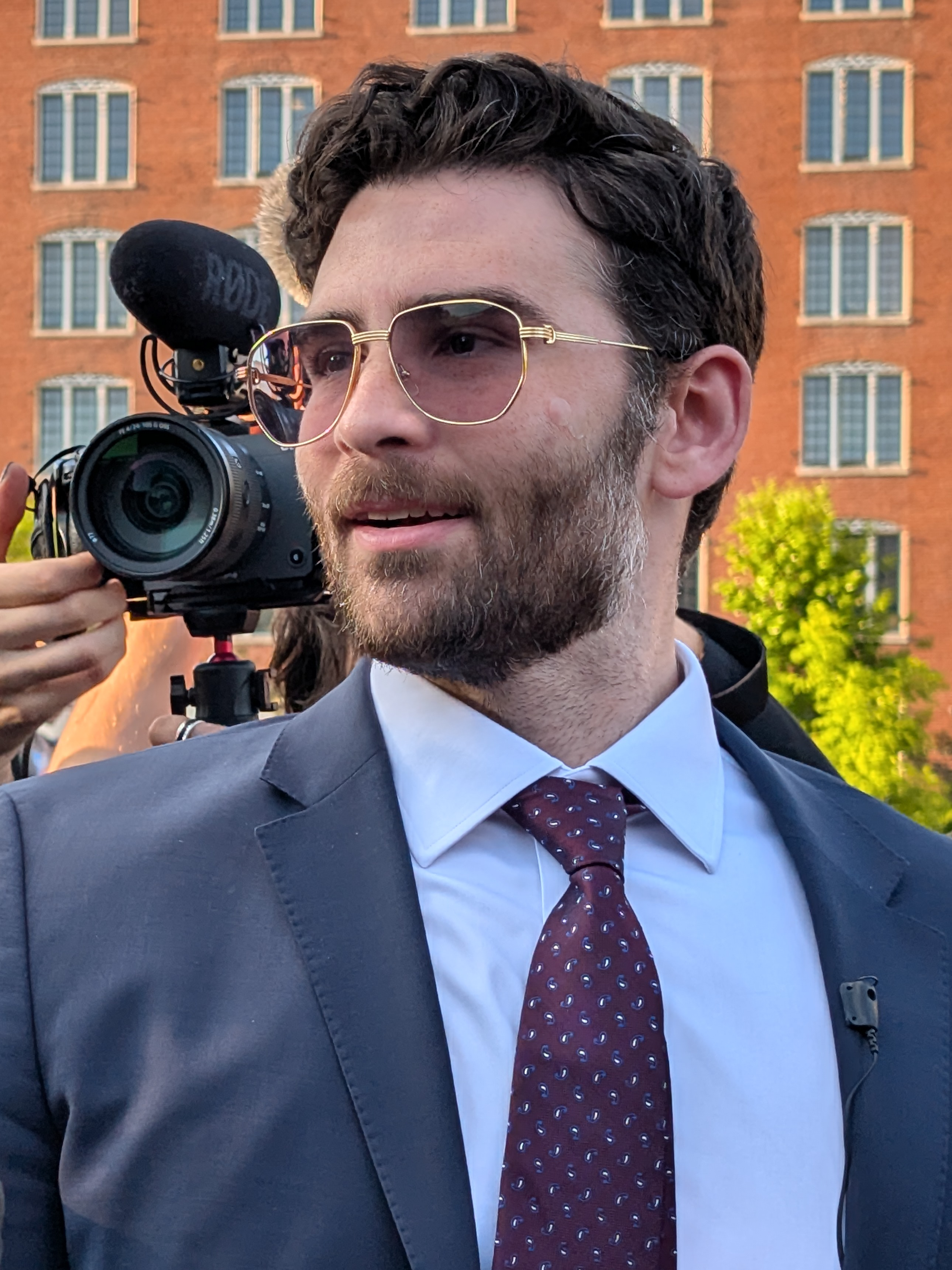
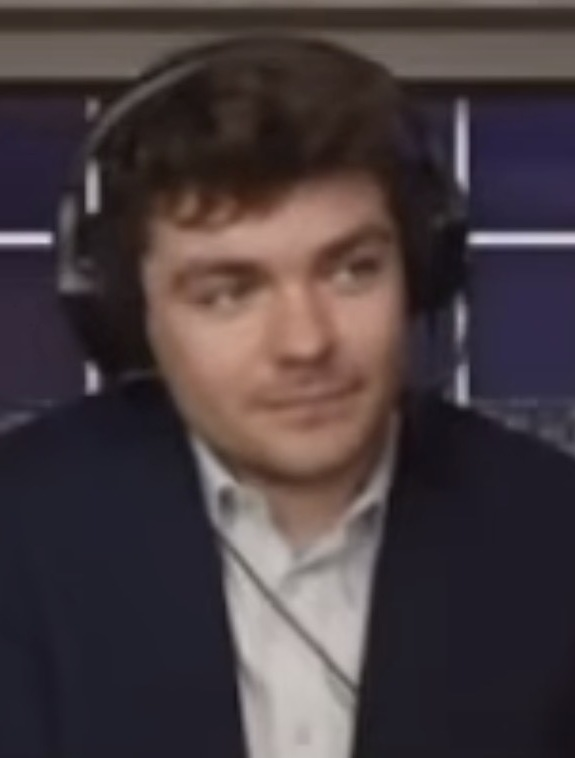
American political pundits Hasan Piker and Nick Fuentes (pictured respectively) have had their rise in prominence attributed to clipping.

Clipping has been interpreted as putting traditional advertising under threat. The success of clipping has drawn attention from larger brands, who are already putting more energy towards digital advertising in the age of the internet. Clippings increased effectiveness and lower cost compared to that of traditional advertising has made it appealing. Evan Stanfield, CEO of the clipping agency Clipping Culture and Grayson Peil, co-founder and COO of the company, have both been involved in the agency's growth as clipping has expanded into a larger advertising model. Stanfield stated in September 2025 that he predicts that clipping will replace traditional advertising soon, with brands willing to invest hundreds of millions into the burgeoning industry. Sam Alavi, bbno$'s manager and the CEO of a marketing and creativity agency who began running clipping campaigns for him in early 2024, remarked in a March 2026 Variety interview that he knew few people competitive in the marketplace that were not utilizing the practice. Bloomberg News, in an interview with Anthony Fujiwara, the CEO of Clipping, has stated that the practice is emblematic of the shift in social media since its beginning, with writer Cecilia D'Anastasio proclaiming in October 2025 that "videos that once seemed unusual or spontaneous and became instant topics of chitchat have given way to orchestrated marketing efforts". Floodify founder Joe Lim estimates that 90% of content folks see online is from clipping, while The Verge's Mia Sato described it as the "TL;DR-ification of the entire internet" in an interview with Vox's Sean Rameswaram.

Some institutions have attempted to clamp down on clipping. Following the Stake controversy, Elon Musk warned of the "annihilation" of manipulative accounts on X, and the site's head of product, Nikita Bier, also announced that they were looking into clipping in a later post. Stake's exit of the UK market in February 2025 by the UK Gambling Commission, compounded with the crackdown of its affiliates on X, mark the first major moves against the clip economy by both platforms and governments. However, its purposely decentralized means of operating have made it difficult to police, with the FTC not following the Gambling Commissions moves despite formally requiring the disclosure of paid content. Additionally, clipped content drives the engagement-based algorithms social media is built upon, meaning that platforms are also incentivized to not move against them. Despite this, undisclosed clipping has still been seen as being under threat from government agencies.

=== Effects on mass media ===
Clipping has also been seen as threatening media as a whole, specifically the actual mediums they are cut from. Ryan Tubridy remarked in June 2025 that clipping was threatening terrestrial television, proclaiming that "people are watching TV, not like it’s a meal, but like it’s a tapas dish, and the show has to be kind of carved up..." A 2025 poll showed that around 71% of Gen Z get their TV show and film recommendations from short-form content, while 68% of 13 to 17 year olds in a 2026 YPulse poll stated that fan edits on social media make them want to view a film or TV show more. Furthermore, 34% of sports fans aged 18 to 24 prefer highlights over full games, while 51% of American Gen Z state that highlights are replacing live games for them, compared to 38% overall. this has made clipping an important way to spread coverage of their products to the masses. Although Hollywood has had an uneasy relationship with clipping, its success in popularizing shows and films such as Obsession, Sinners, and Michael, has led to its increased usage by major companies such as HBO and Lionsgate, with films and TV shows such as Mean Girls and The Sopranos being clipped and uploaded to platforms such as TikTok. The same YPulse poll stated that 79% of individuals in that age group also consume shows and movies via clips online. This has also been seen in other mediums; the technology podcast TBPN averaged only 7 thousand views on their livestreams, but 257 thousand on clips of their show, mostly on X.

The proliferation of clipping of TV shows and films has led to some controversy. YPulse's Tori D’Amico, in a 2026 interview with Gold Derby, stated that clips have a sort of "microdrama" feel that can be engaging to audiences, though she compared this to fan edits which she described as making it "almost as if the movie was made for social media." Concern has also been raised in how having an environment where these mediums are disseminated primarily through chopped-up viral clips could undermine a broader piece of media as a whole. Reports from The Hollywood Reporter and Gold Derby have stated that some major studios and streaming platforms such as Disney+ have instructed filmmakers to film certain pivotal scenes in a manner that can make them easily clippable for vertical content, such as concentrating all the characters into a small frame. Clipping's effectiveness has also made some call for the Academy Awards to utilize them in their campaigns, especially in the context of declining viewership among young people. On a similar note, writing for the Jefferson City, Missouri newspaper News Tribune, John Combest analyzed the practice, and then stated that the newspaper and Missouri politicians should "steal" the idea.

=== Authenticity and content promoted ===
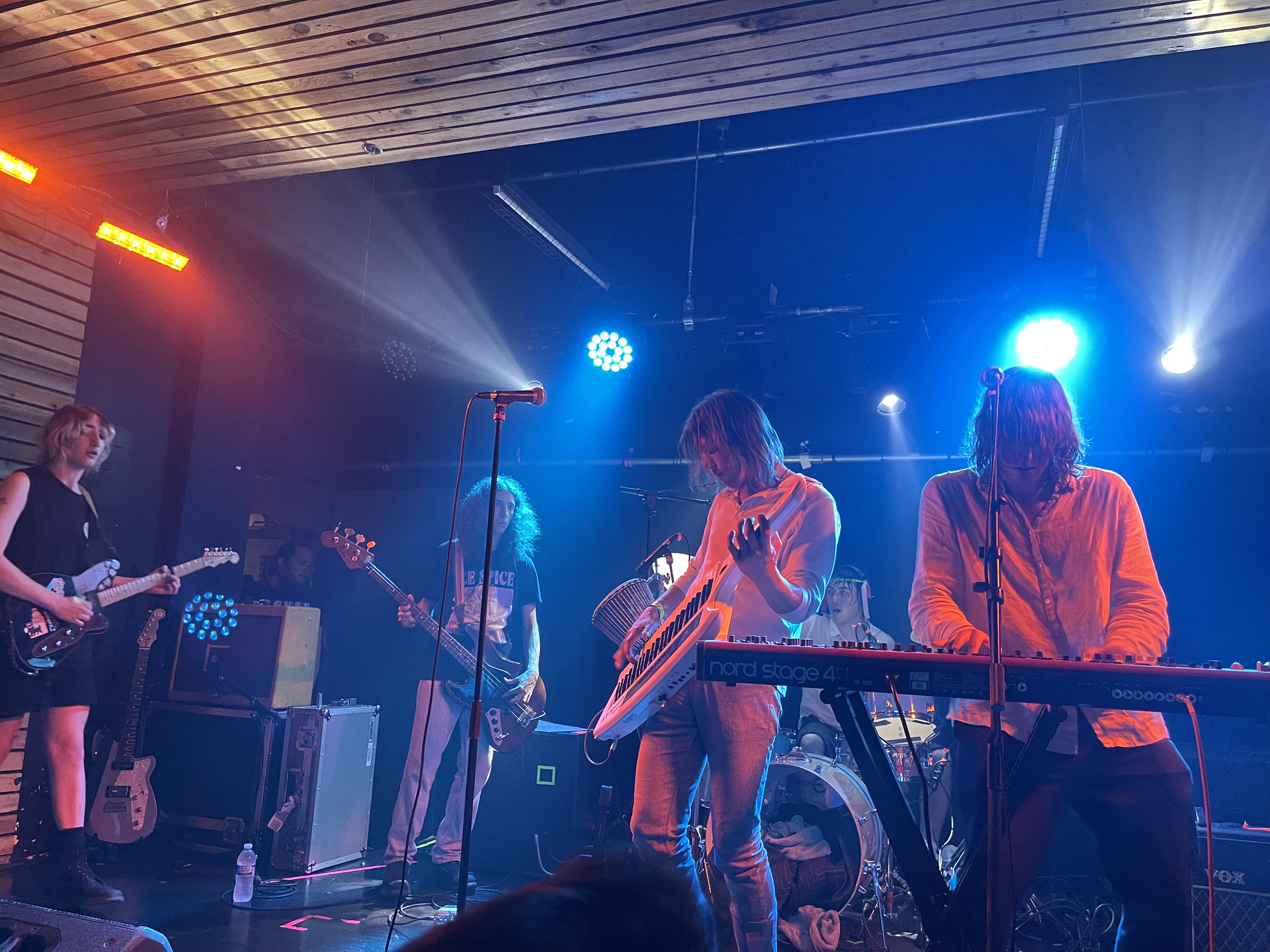
American rock band Geese (pictured here in 2024) were subject to allegations of being industry plants in 2026 after it was revealed that a marketing agency had artificially boosted their virality online via clipping.

The rise of clipping has generated scrutiny and accusations towards various groups and individuals accused of using it to generate attention. The American rock band Geese was subject to controversy in early 2026 after the founders of a marketing agency named Chaotic Good admitted on a podcast that they had used thousands of accounts on social media to artificially boost their perceived popularity via clips. Furthermore, the authenticity of some of the clips generated has also been questioned; Sato relays the story of a clip from Tucker Carlson's podcast circulating online where he renounces support for Donald Trump. The clip, which was picked up by TMZ, The View, and the former campaign X account of the Kamala Harris 2024 presidential campaign, did not include other statements from that episode such as Carlson describing Barack Obama as being racist towards whites and brushing off accusations of Trump being racist on the basis that he was romantically involved with "everyone". Additionally, there are claims that the views from clips can be susceptible to botting.

Clipping has helped boosted a multitude of big and small creators, including Druski, Mark Rober, Zach Justice, Bobbi Althoff, and Bobby Bones. In particular, the rise of the American streamer Clavicular precipitated extensive coverage of clipping and its role in popularizing previously unknown individuals. The streamer garnered widespread coverage in late 2025 and early 2026 for his looksmaxxing content, as well as antics such as hitting a man in his Cybertruck, throwing racial slurs, and singing along to Kanye West's song "Heil Hitler" with other right-wing and manosphere influencers, viewed through most people by clips. Sato, who wrote an article in The Verge that helped bring attention to clipping, was inspired to cover the topic by Clavicular, whose media strategy was described by her as "the industrialized version of a podcast that is just posting its own clips organically". Clavicular oversees 62 thousand clippers, many of whom make tens of thousands a month, and spends roughly $650 thousand monthly on clipping campaigns. In addition to Clavicular, clipping has also been analyzed in the rise of controversial political figures such as Hasan Piker and Nick Fuentes.

Similarly, clipping has fallen under scrutiny under the types of content that tend to be promoted by it. The Combat Antisemitism Movement stated in July 2026 that antisemitism was more likely to garner prominence on clips from Instagram reels, with it being seven times more likely to appear on an account's most viewed videos than other forms of content. Their analysis included content creators such as Myron Gaines, Sneako, and Adin Ross, where 92 antisemitic videos were observed drew nearly 40 million views combined despite only accounting for less than 5% of the sample size. They attributed this to clipping's lower barrier of entry and the ability of officially unaffiliated accounts to deflect responsibility of the claims made to the original creators. Additionally, given clipping's popularity amongst legally-grey and even illegal industries such as online gambling, concern has been raised about how these clips target children.

=== The Clip Economy ===
Clipping came under the attention of a certain Ed Elson in early 2026, an American business analyst and writer who co-hosts a podcast called Prof G Markets with Scott Galloway. Elson noticed that clips of their podcast that they had been making under the assumption of it being supplemental promotional material was in actuality becoming the principal method of viewing their content; he recounts frequently about meeting fans who recognize him who admit to never seeing his podcast, only clips. In an April 14 article on the podcasts' newsletter, he coined the term clip economy, and he received substantial media coverage afterwards, helping to draw more attention to the phenomenon, which had already been picking up attention in late 2025 and early 2026.

== See also ==
- Sound bite
