= Clavicular (influencer) =

American influencer (born 2005)

- Peters in 2026
- Born: Braden Eric Peters; December 2005 (age 20)
- Occupation: Influencer
- Years active: 2025–present
- Known for: Looksmaxxing

Braden Eric Peters (born December 2005), better known as Clavicular, is an American influencer. He rose to popularity on social media between 2025 and 2026 for promoting "looksmaxxing", a trend of using complex methods to improve one's physical appearance, such as "bonesmashing", a pseudoscientific practice involving hitting one's own facial bones with a hammer or fist, as well as the use of anabolic steroids and methamphetamine as an appetite suppressant.

In September 2026, charges were filed against Peters in Massachusetts state court for rape, drugging, and providing alcohol to a 17-year-old minor when he was 19 years old. He has pled not guilty and denied the charges.

== Early life ==
Braden Eric Peters was born in December 2005 and raised in Hoboken, New Jersey. His father is a businessman, and his mother is a former bodybuilder.

Peters has stated that he became interested in looksmaxxing—a term originating on incel message boards in the early 2010s that describes the process of making oneself as physically attractive as possible—in high school, which he has attributed to wanting to influence others politically by becoming more attractive.

Peters described his life during the COVID-19 lockdowns as being "online for 14 hours a day", browsing looksmaxxing forums, playing Grand Theft Auto V, and skipping online classes. Peters has stated in interviews that he would often hide his testosterone supplements from his parents, and when caught, he would be sent to live with his grandmother. Peters says he was expelled after "just three weeks" from Sacred Heart University in Fairfield, Connecticut, for his use of "peptides and 'roids".

== Career ==
=== Online ===
Peters, known to his online followers as "Clav", became popular online by 2025 for his content that focused on looksmaxxing on both Kick and TikTok. His alias "Clavicular" is based on the emphasis placed on clavicle width within the looksmaxxing community. He instructs fans on how to "ascend", or to become more attractive and successful, and to "hardmaxx", or undergo intense and painful physical alterations. Peters's looksmaxxing content includes traditional bodybuilding and fitness training, along with "a new focus on sort of facial esthetics".

He has participated in and advocated for looksmaxxing practices such as "bonesmashing", a pseudoscientific practice involving hitting one's facial bones with a hammer or fist to reshape the jaw via microscopic bone fractures. Peters has also admitted to taking methamphetamine to remain thin. He has spoken about taking anabolic steroids over several years to become more muscular, which, according to him, made him infertile by 2025. By late 2025, he also began selling access to a self-improvement and looksmaxxing course called the "Clavicular System", later called "Clavicular's Clan", for $50 per month. The course provides guides on how to "ascend" and on suggested peptides to inject.

In November 2025, YouTube terminated Peters's original channel for facilitating access to websites that illegally sold regulated goods, removing two additional channels in April 2026 for "severe or repeated violations." Although he attempted to return to the platform with other channels, YouTube permanently terminated these accounts in April 2026, citing a violation of its terms of service regarding ban evasion.

In November 2025, a video of Peters injecting his then-17-year-old girlfriend with fat-dissolving peptides to reshape her jaw gained attention online. In a later stream, he injected influencer Jenny Popach with Aqualyx, a fat-dissolving acid.

In December 2025, Peters was interviewed by conservative political commentator Michael Knowles for The Daily Wire. In it, Peters described Vice President JD Vance as "subhuman" for his "recessed side profile" and for being "obese", asking, "How are you fat and expected to lead a country?" He agreed with Knowles's criticism of California governor Gavin Newsom as both a "degenerate" and a "liar" but said that, in a potential 2028 United States presidential election in which Newsom ran against Vance, he would vote for "Chad" Newsom for "mogging" (being more attractive than) Vance. The segment soon went viral online. Other clips of him from the interview, including one in which he described actress Sydney Sweeney as "malformed" with an "extremely recessed" upper maxilla and "eyes of doom with no infraorbital support", also went viral online.

According to Joseph Bernstein of The New York Times, Peters was earning more than $100,000 a month by February 2026 from his Kick livestreams. Peters said, during a March 2026 livestream, that he earned over $100,000 during a single five-day stretch on Kick. In August 2026, Peters stated that he would move away from Kick and its owner Stake Online Casino after being sponsored by Duel, an online casino. Peters has appeared as a blackjack dealer for Duel.

In an April 2026 interview conducted with Adam Hegarty for 60 Minutes Australia, Hegarty asked Peters if he was an incel due to his associations with "looksmaxxing" (a term originally coined by the incel community) and with Andrew Tate; Peters replied that "looksmaxxing" had nothing to do with incel culture, and abruptly ended the interview. Interviewed by Sean Hannity, Peters stated, "Looksmaxxing is trying to escape inceldom, if anything".

Peters announced a national "college partytype tour" which included his arrival at Texas A&M University on August 28, 2026. A nightclub that had arranged for his Clemson University stop cancelled his event scheduled for August 26, 2026, citing safety concerns for guests and staff. A planned appearance, scheduled for August 30 at a Chapel Hill nightclub, was canceled following plans for community protests.

In July 2026, The New York Times listed Peters as one of the "39-ish most stylish people of 2026".

=== Modeling ===
Peters in February 2026.

Days after being arrested in Arizona in February 2026, Peters walked on a looksmaxxing–themed runway in New York City for designer Elena Velez, whom Bernstein described as "known for her use of controversial internet microcelebrities as models", in collaboration with Remilia Corporation. Monica Sabchak of The Spectator described him as "the star of the evening" and as evidence that "the algorithm has stepped onto the runway". His opening of Guillermo Andrade's 424 Spring/Summer 2027 presentation at the Jardin des Archives Nationales in Paris in June 2026 was severely criticized by Canadian actor François Arnaud.

=== Business ventures ===
Clavicular had an ownership stake in the Miami nightclub Bacara Club, which opened in April 2026. By June of that year, he stated that he had sold his shares and no longer had any ownership in the club, stating online that he had been "pressured into unideal agreements". According to TMZ, he had made an initial $400,000 investment into the club with the promise of receiving half of its profits, of which, according to a lawsuit filed by his lawyer, he never received any part.

== Incidents ==
=== Tesla Cybertruck incident ===
On December 24, 2025, a video from a livestream of Peters hitting a man with a Tesla Cybertruck in Miami-Dade County quickly circulated online. In the video, the man climbs onto the hood of the car, and someone off-camera encourages Peters to start driving. He accelerates and appears to run over the man before asking if he is dead. A woman sitting next to him says, "I don't know", to which he responds, "Hopefully".

Later in the livestream, Peters speaks to a man in a reflective vest and states that he hit the man in self-defense. Peters alleges that the man had been stalking him and had previously thrown red liquid on him; he also alleges that there were multiple people, one of whom looked like they "had a pistol" underneath their clothing, surrounding his car. A call between him and fellow livestreamer Adin Ross, in which Ross advised him to keep livestreaming and refrain from speaking about the situation, also circulated online.

Thomas Chatterton Williams, writing for The Atlantic, called the livestream "perhaps [Peters's] most viral moment". Following the incident, he was banned from Kick. James Fishback, then a fringe candidate for the Republican nomination in the 2026 Florida gubernatorial election, tweeted that Peters had done "nothing wrong" by hitting the man with his car.

=== "Heil Hitler" sing-along ===
In January 2026, a video of Peters, Nick Fuentes, Myron Gaines, Andrew Tate, Tristan Tate, Sneako, and Justin Waller singing along to Kanye West's antisemitic 2025 song "Heil Hitler" at the Miami Beach nightclub Vendôme went viral. In response to an outcry, Peters declared it was "just a song", calling it "funny" that the group had "enough status and influence" to get the song played. The incident was condemned by Miami Beach mayor Steven Meiner. Several local club owners, including David Grutman, announced that they had banned the group from their venues. Peters met with Grutman and David Einhorn, owner of Papi Steak, telling them that he was "not trying to do politics anymore".

=== France trip ===
In June 2026, Peters visited Paris, where he modeled at the Fashion Week opening and attended the Fête de la Musique. Clips from his livestream showing him attempting, without success, to engage with women subsequently went viral in France, drawing ridicule from netizens and French media. Madame Figaro described Peters as being "massively rejected" by Parisian women. Le Monde commented that the "masculinist influencer" who "set out to test his self-proclaimed 'alpha male' magnetism on Parisian women" was "only met with indifference or disdain."

In one video, Peters expressed confusion about his lack of success in Paris and theorized that the French women who appeared uninterested in him were probably "lesbians". In later messages, he called the French "impolite shitbags", mocked France's quality of living, and stated that European women were less attractive than American ones due to Europe's gene pool being "devastated" in World War II. After Paris, Peters visited the French Riviera. He initially expressed appreciation for Saint-Tropez, but later called the city "retarded". In Cannes, he was denied access to a venue, and heckled in the street by a woman who called him a "Nazi" and told him he was "not welcome" in France.

=== Israel trip ===
During a July 2026 trip to Israel, Chabad "outreach figure" Yossi Farro presented Peters with a "custom necklace" which shows the Star of David fused with the OpenAI logo. The moment was considered the "latest flashpoint" in a debate over how the Jewish community should engage with controversial online figures. Farro joked online that the "mashup" amounted to the AI company's logo "mogging" the Jewish star. The two switched restaurants mid-meal once Peters realized the one they had chosen was not kosher. Farro posted about the trip, saying that Peters "is loving Israel and Israel is loving him". "Peters's manager is Jewish", Farro further explained, "and the rabbi of the Chabad community connected to the manager thought it would be worthwhile to introduce us. Thank God, we connected."

The Times of Israel reported that Peters had been seen talking to prime minister Benjamin Netanyahu's adviser Topaz Luk at a Tel Aviv nightclub. Israeli influencers who appeared on Peters's streams—Shira Braun and Shira Klein—were reprimanded and demoted from their positions by the Israel Defense Forces.

== Public image ==
=== Incel slang and use of racial slurs ===
Peters, who has over 1 million followers, has almost single-handedly brought looksmaxxing from the shadows of incel forums to the attention of everyone using the internet, most especially young boys.

— Nina Driscoll-Mann, Women's Media Center

Peters became known for his use of racial slurs, which Bernstein described as "chronic", and wearing clothing bearing the word. Helen Rummel of The Arizona Republic wrote that he was "well-known" for "the use of racist slurs in his livestreams". Peters said on a livestream that "It's not a racist thing. It's just a fun word to say." The Atlantic's Charlie Warzel wrote that he "revel[s] in anti-Semitism". Peters stated, "I'm more of, like, a moggist, not a racist."

Clavicular's use of incelosphere and manosphere slang has largely popularized it online and in the mainstream. In February 2026, a tweet describing Peters as having been "brutally frame mogged" by an Arizona State University fraternity leader in a video became a copypasta and meme. The term jestermaxxing, used to describe having fun, also spread online that month due to its use in video captions of Peters dancing at the club. The suffixes -mogging and -maxxing and the incel term foid, a shortening of the portmanteau femoid, which describes women as subhuman, found popular usage online by February 2026 due to these and other memes of Peters. They were typically posted by "clippers", social media users who repost clips from livestreams with eye-catching captions and, according to Katie Notopoulos of Business Insider, often "have a financial motive" to be paid by creator programs or influencers. Bernstein also noted that some Kick users were paid by the platform for clipping Peters's livestreams.

=== Ideology ===
Will Lavin wrote for Complex in late 2025 that Peters was "often deemed controversial" online. Williams of The Atlantic wrote that Peters's "brand of nihilism" was enticing to young men; and in February 2026 Chloe Combi described Peters as having attracted "a huge and growing Gen A boy following". For Intelligencer, Ezra Marcus described Peters as "something of an edgelord folk hero" whose "profit strategy fuses shock-jock tactics with straightforward marketing". Charlie Sabgir, director of the Young Men Research Project, wrote in January 2026 for Rolling Stone, "His fixation on optimization is inseparable from aggressive sexism." Looksmaxxing in general, and Clavicular specifically, have been criticized as likely to harm impressionable young men by promoting unrealistic beauty standards and exposing them to incel ideology and misogynistic rhetoric. A March 2026 column in The Guardian compared Clavicular's "self improvement" methods to body dysmorphia.

For Wired, Jason Parham wrote in September 2025 that Peters was one of looksmaxxing's "most popular influencers". In January 2026, Williams of The Atlantic referred to him as the "newest star" and "most recognizable member" of the looksmaxxing movement, Charlie Sabgir of Rolling Stone called him "a premier figure" within looksmaxxing, and Dave Schilling of The Guardian called him "one of the most prominent influencers in the looksmaxxing community".

Russian television presenter and journalist Ksenia Sobchak publicly criticized Peters, describing his looksmaxxing content as harmful, arguing his online image "reflects increasingly extreme views and unhealthy attitudes toward self-image." Turning Point USA spokesman Andrew Kolvet sees Peters's looksmaxxing message as part of a "giant red warning sign" reflecting "a growing mentorship vacuum among young men searching for guidance."

Peters has described himself as apolitical and stated in 2026 that he "would never want to be associated with politics", which he has described as "jester", a looksmaxxing term for a "foolish waste of time". Lauren Smith wrote for Spiked that he was "seen as a player in the Very Online right" but that he was "best understood not as a right-wing thought leader" due to "only offer[ing] a parody of masculinity", while Joanna Williams wrote for The Telegraph that he had "been embraced by America's Very Online Right" and that he, Fuentes, and Tate "make the overlap between politics and appearance explicit". For the Miami New Times, Alex DeLuca wrote that he was "associated with [the] 'manosphere' and far-right extremism".

== Legal issues ==
Mugshot of Peters from March 2026

Peters was arrested for a summer 2024 incident. In January 2025, both charges against Peters were dismissed at the victims' request.

On February 7, 2026, Peters was arrested in Scottsdale, Arizona, on suspicion of dangerous drug possession, with court documents describing him as carrying Adderall and Anavar, and possession of a forged instrument at a bar, after attempting to gain entry using a fake ID. According to officers, he was shown on a livestream asking patrons at the bar for Adderall. He was released from custody the following day and soon tweeted that the charges were "straight up political persecution". Prosecutors dropped the charges on February 11, 2026, because of the low likelihood of conviction.

In late March 2026, Peters was arrested in Florida on battery charges, relating to an alleged altercation between his girlfriend and another woman. On February 2, 2026, a 19-year-old woman reported that she had been attacked by Violet Marie Lentz, 24. Detectives found that Peters had provoked the fight.

Around the same time, the Florida Fish and Wildlife Conservation Commission launched an investigation into Peters for shooting a previously deceased alligator on a livestream. On April 29, 2026, Peters was charged with unlawfully discharging a firearm in public, and potentially faced up to one year in jail. On May 15, 2026, he was sentenced to six months of probation and 20 hours of community service, following a plea deal. In August 2026, prosecutors dropped all related charges against Peters in this case.

=== Sexual assault charges ===
In April 2026, Aleksandra Vasilevna Mendoza filed a lawsuit against Peters alleging fraud, infliction of emotional distress, and battery, relating to an incident in 2025. At the time in question, Mendoza had begun working with Peters. Mendoza alleged that Peters sexually assaulted her, and also injected her face with Aqualyx during the encounter. Her complaint alleged that his actions had led to "severe emotional distress, trauma, humiliation, nightmares, fear, panic, and mental anguish." Peters's lawyer responded to the accusations saying, "These are allegations only and remain unproven. Mr. Peters denies the claims and disputes the characterization of events."

On September 8, 2026, charges were filed against Peters in Massachusetts for criminal rape, drugging, and providing alcohol to Aleksandra Vasilevna Mendoza. The charges related to an incident that is alleged to have occurred on May 23, 2025, in which a then 19-year-old Peters is accused of giving vodka to a 17-year-old Mendoza on a livestream and having sex with her several times afterward, when she was unable to consent. Peters's arraignment was scheduled for October 14, 2026. He plead not guilty and was released on bail. His lawyer said the accuser and Peters maintained a personal relationship which continued for another year following the alleged incident. He was indicted on November 13, with two felony charges, and one misdemeanor charge of supplying alcohol to a person who is under the legal limit to drink.

== Personal life ==
As of 2026, Peters lives in Florida. In summer 2026, he rented a penthouse at Paramount Miami Worldcenter in downtown Miami. He is Catholic.

=== Health ===
In a February 2026 livestream, part of an interview with The New York Times, Peters listed substances that were part of his daily routine, including testosterone, Accutane, retatrutide, and nebivolol. He began taking testosterone shots at 14.

He also told The New York Times that he suspects he is sterile after years of injecting himself with testosterone and alluded to not necessarily enjoying the act of sex. Declaring himself infertile in the past due to testosterone injections, Peters explained: "So it's just like a negative feedback loop when you're not needing to produce testosterone anymore because your body realizes, okay, we're getting it from an outside source."

Peters has stated that he is on the autism spectrum, although he has not been professionally diagnosed. In a June 29, 2026, tweet, he shared that he used to stalk strangers so he could study neurotypical human behavior:

One of the strategies I used to become more neurotypical was to pick out a random person on the street and follow them around for the entire day, I would carefully log all of their movements and observations I made. I still try to do this from time to time, but I get recognized a lot which makes it hard.

In December 2024, Peters crashed his white BMW driving home from a restaurant security job on Cape Cod in Massachusetts, posting that he had fallen asleep from using baclofen, a muscle relaxer he had recommended his viewers use to reduce anxiety. On April 14, 2026, while streaming in public with fellow influencer Androgenic, Peters experienced a drug overdose and was hospitalized; he had been using a combination of Adderall, dextromethorphan, pregabalin, ketamine, and 1,4-Butanediol, a combination referred to as the "pentastack" by Androgenic. Of the incident, Peters later said, "I didn't overdose or anything. I mean I just, literally, had not eaten that day, consumed too much alcohol, and [was] just knocked out a little bit." He also wrote that the substances he uses is "just a cope trying to feel neurotypical while being in public, but obviously that isn't a real solution".
