= Londonmaxxing =

Social media trend

Londonmaxxing is a social media trend describing the act of getting as much out of London and the experiences it has to offer. It emerged on Twitter in 2026 before spreading across platforms as well as being used in news sources.

== Adoption ==
The term suggests a positive and optimistic view of London, being coined by Charlie Ward in particular reference to the city's leading position in tech and entrepreneurship. It has therefore been used as a way to pushback against much of the pessimism surrounding the supposed decline of the city, often fuelled by bots.

The term uses the "-maxxing" suffix, internet slang for personal optimisation which became popular on the internet from the 2010s.

While Londonmaxxing's original usage reflected the London's competitiveness in certain industries, the term has spread to particularly describe tapping into London's cultural scene, being used in this sense on social media among influencers and young professionals. Sadiq Khan would endorse the trend and attach the phrase to his profile's bio on social media.

== See also ==
- Anglophile
- Becoming Chinese
