= -maxxing =

Internet slang suffix meaning to optimize or maximize something

-maxxing is an Internet slang suffix meaning to optimize or maximize a particular quality or activity. The spelling -maxxing originated from the incelosphere in the 2010s, particularly from the term looksmaxxing, which refers to attempts to maximize one's physical attractiveness. The suffix's use subsequently spread beyond the incelosphere, entering mainstream usage through TikTok and other social media platforms in the 2020s, where it is often applied humorously to everyday activities.

== Incelosphere lexicology ==
The incelosphere uses specialized slang to signal in-group identity. Familiarity with this vocabulary can distinguish members from outsiders and communicate alignment with the subculture's beliefs.

One recurring suffix is -maxxing, a suffix used to describe attempts to improve or optimize a particular attribute of one's life, with the aim of increasing one's romantic or sexual prospects. For example, jestermaxxing refers to the practice of using humor or comedic behavior to attract women. Other suffixes popularized by the incelosphere include -cel, -pill, -mogging and -fuel.

Some terms reflect the subculture's more fatalistic outlook. For example, ropemaxxing is a term referring to suicide. This may point to the prevalence of suicidal ideation within the incelosphere.

Mogging can also be used independently of the suffix -mogging. It refers to outclassing someone in an attribute, particularly physical attractiveness. The term is derived from the phrase AMOG, meaning "alpha male of the group".

== Etymology and origins ==
=== Game theory and gaming ===
The concept of maximizing a single variable at the expense of others has roots in minimax theory, developed in 1940s academic game theory. The term was later adopted in tabletop role-playing games as "min-maxing", a strategy where a player dumps all available resources into a single tactic, optimizing for raw mechanical advantage over balance. The term appeared in the Dungeon Master Guide for Advanced Dungeons & Dragons, which advised game masters on handling players who optimized character builds for maximum mechanical advantage. In role-playing game communities more broadly, max came to mean fully developing a single character trait. Linguist Ewelina Prażmo, writing in Topics in Linguistics, traced the morphological path of the suffix from the verb to maximize through clipping (to max), spelling modification (to maxx), and finally reanalysis as a derivational affix (-maxx) distinct in meaning from its parent word.

=== Incelosphere origins ===
The double consonantized suffix maxx originated in the incelosphere, where it is used to denote strategies to optimize one's LMS (looks, money, status) and SMV (sexual market value). Beginning in the early 2010s, incel communities on message boards took the -maxxing suffix and applied it to real-life personal attributes. The most prominent coinage was looksmaxxing, maximizing one's physical attractiveness to raise one's perceived "sexual market value". Prażmo identified looksmaxxing as the prototypical formation from which other -maxxing coinages were created, first by direct analogy and then through an increasingly productive derivational schema that could attach to nouns, adjectives, acronyms, and complex expressions. The vocabulary expanded rapidly: gymmaxxing, stylemaxxing, personalitymaxxing, moneymaxxing, and dozens of others.

Linguist Adam Aleksic traced the development of -maxxing and related incel vocabulary to 4chan, where the absence of user accounts meant the only way to signal experience was through fluency in shared slang. Terms like maxxing, mogging, and cucked functioned as what Aleksic called "metalinguistic indicators"—markers that an anonymous poster was a committed member of the community rather than an outsider. The vocabulary later spread through Reddit, where incel users promoted looksmaxxing language as helpful suggestions on "rate me" subreddits even after dedicated incel communities like r/Incels were banned. These forums continued to normalize the jargon, making it easier to both take seriously and parody.

Nitsuh Abebe, in The New York Times Magazine's "On Language" column, observed that incel communities tended to analyze human interaction as a game whose mechanics had unfairly disadvantaged them, and that -maxxing represented an attempt to apply game strategy to social life. In Public Seminar, Jake Neuffer argued that what made the suffix distinctive was its quantitative dimension—the implication that personal qualities could be numerically optimized—which he connected to the increasing economization of everyday life under neoliberalism and the influence of dating app ranking systems. The original thinker to compare inceldom and modern dating as a whole to market capitalism was Michel Houellebecq, who through his book Whatever argued that sexual liberalism had expanded the market mechanism to apply to human relationships, notably sexual and romantic relationships. (Note: The original title of Houellebecq's Whatever was "The Extension of the Domain of Struggle", emphasizing this exact point.)

=== Mainstream adoption ===
Jokes referencing looksmaxxing and mogging began appearing on Instagram and Twitter around 2021, eventually going viral through TikTok and Instagram Reels. Aleksic noted that the first people to bring looksmaxxing to TikTok appear to have been women, who unknowingly repurposed incel concepts from rate-me subreddits; beauty influencers on #GirlTok used metrics like canthal tilt and interocular distance in makeup tutorials and rating filters. As users picked up on the absurdity of the underlying ideas, the jokes multiplied, and -maxxing and -pilled were fully trending by late 2023. In a March 2024 lecture at Georgetown University, Aleksic polled his audience and found about 40 percent of students were familiar with the terms; when he repeated the poll at Stanford University two months later, recognition had reached 80 percent.

By 2024, the suffix had largely detached from its incel origins. Media coverage documented uses including sleepmaxxing (optimizing sleep), beachmaxxing, jazzmaxxing (collecting jazz records), and potassiummaxxing (eating bananas). Dazed declared 2024 "the year of maxxing", noting the suffix could have been a contender for word of the year alongside Merriam-Webster's polarization and Oxford's brain rot. Aleksic attributed the suffix's success partly to its structure as a phrasal template—it can be snapped onto virtually any word—and partly to its memetic value as comedy. He also noted in The Washington Post that Generation Z speakers were largely using the suffix ironically, often with no awareness of its incel origins.

The suffix has also appeared outside informal contexts. In February 2026, an official United States Department of Defense account on X used the term lethalitymaxxing. In June 2026, the UK Secretary of State for Science, Innovation, and Technology Liz Kendall used the term "Britmaxxing" in the context of AI industrial policy.

The -maxxing suffix gained popularity around the same time as LLM AI systems rose to relevance, leading to terms like tokenmaxxing (where LLMs, whose usage is measured in tokens, are used excessively) and benchmaxxing (where AI systems are optimised for certain benchmarks so they appear to be more capable) becoming standard terminology among AI engineers.

== Cultural analysis ==
=== Self-improvement and optimization ===
Much of the commentary around -maxxing has focused on the gap between the language and what it actually describes. Abebe pointed out that many incel -maxxing strategies were mundane social advice—wash your face, exercise, wear decent clothes—repackaged in a game-theoretical framework. Stephanie Alice Baker, a sociologist at City St George's, University of London, situated the trend within a broader merger of wellness culture and productivity culture since the late twentieth century, where self-optimization became tied to personal success.

=== Incel language going mainstream ===
The spread of -maxxing is part of a wider pattern of incel and manosphere slang entering general usage. Aleksic argued that the incel community "has probably contributed more to the development of modern slang than any other online community", attributing this in part to the volume of language produced by radicalized and insular echo chambers. He observed that the incel terms which crossed over successfully, such as -maxxing, -pilled, sigma, and chad, tended to be those that could remove overt misogyny while keeping a quantitative or competitive edge. More explicitly derogatory terms like roastie and femoid did not make the jump. Neuffer attributed the appeal to the way such language captured a generation's experience of quantified social life on digital platforms, particularly dating apps with hidden ranking systems like Elo scores.

Whether this normalization is harmful is disputed. Jamilla Rosdahl of the Australian College of Applied Psychology argued in The Conversation that looksmaxxing content on TikTok could function as a pipeline toward incel radicalization for young men. Abebe took a different view, suggesting that the comedic application of -maxxing to absurd everyday subjects functioned as a kind of immune response, with each tongue-in-cheek use sustaining a joke about how ridiculous the optimization mentality looks when applied to ordinary life.

=== Gender ===
-maxxing originated in predominantly male online spaces (e.g., forums), but the suffix and its associated practices have recently crossed into more female dominated communities. Aleksic noted that it was women on TikTok's #GirlTok who first brought looksmaxxing concepts to the platform, unknowingly repurposing incel vocabulary from 'rate-me' subreddits. Dazed reported the existence of subreddits dedicated to looksmaxxing for women of color, with one community having over 34,000 members. Carolina Are, an innovation fellow at Northumbria University, argued that the trend reinforces binary beauty norms and can feed into prescriptive content about how men and women should behave through algorithmic recommendation.

== See also ==
- Glossary of 2020s slang
- Incel § Lexicology
- Manosphere
