= TBPN =

Technology podcast

Technology Business Programming Network

Cast and voices
- Hosted by: John Coogan; Jordi Hays

Production
- Length: c. 180 minutes

Publication
- Provider: OpenAI

Related
- Website: tbpn.com

Technology Business Programming Network (TBPN) is an American live video and audio podcast focused on business and technology news hosted by John Coogan and Jordi Hays. The podcast streams weekdays from 11 AM–2 PM PT. It is primarily broadcast on YouTube, X, and Substack, with full episodes available on Apple Podcasts and Spotify. The show currently only has a modest live general viewership though it is reported to be influential with technology and venture capital insiders. TBPN has around eleven employees and has around 70,000 viewers per daily episode. It was acquired by OpenAI in April 2026 for an undisclosed sum.

== Background ==
John Coogan is co-founder of meal replacement company Soylent and nicotine pouch and gum company Lucy. He also worked as entrepreneur in residence at Peter Thiel’s venture firm Founders Fund. Jordi Hays founded Branded Native, a YouTube advertising company, as well as a fintech company called Capital (formerly called Party Round) with his wife, Sarah Chase Hays and led the company to its acquisition by Rho Technologies in August 2023.

In September 2025, TBPN hired former Postmates and HQ Trivia executive Dylan Abruscato as President. In December 2025, the New York Stock Exchange announced a formal partnership with TBPN.

== Guest appearances ==
The show has regularly interviewed and has had guest appearances of business executives, founders, and celebrities. The show's guests have included Meta CEO Mark Zuckerberg, Microsoft CEO Satya Nadella, filmmaker James Cameron, Anduril Industries co-founder Palmer Luckey, Marc Andreessen of Andreessen Horowitz, OpenAI co-founder and CEO Sam Altman, DoorDash co-founder Andy Fang, and Eddy Cue of Apple.
