= Mogging =

Neologism and slang term

Mogging is a neologism and slang term denoting superiority over others else — most often in terms of appearance, self-confidence, or social status — in which a person "outshines" those around them. The term gained widespread popularity in 2026 among Gen Z and Gen Alpha youth. The Collins English Dictionary has named it 2026's Word of the Year.

== Origins ==
Linguists trace the word's origin to the acronym AMOG (Alpha Male of the Group). The term emerged in online communities of the manosphere and incels in the early 2000s to describe a man who dominates those around him through his status or charisma. By the 2010s, community users had shortened AMOG to "mog" and turned it into a verb, and its meaning shifted toward physical and visual superiority. On fitness forums and within the looksmaxxing subculture, the term meant "to look more attractive, taller, or more muscular than someone else, outshining them".

== In culture ==
In 2026, the word spread to TikTok, X, Instagram, and other social media platforms, where users began to use it much more widely and often poked fun at its original context. The word entered the everyday vocabulary of young people and became an internet meme.

According to Brand Analytics, the word made it into the top list of the most popular internet memes on the Runet during the summer of 2026. The word gained widespread popularity on the Runet, in particular, thanks to TikTokers and the band "TSUEFA", who released the song "i can mog you" (in Russian: я тебя могну) and accompanying dance videos.

== Contemporary usage ==
=== Russia ===
In October 2026, officers of Russia's FSB, together with video blogger Sergey Trukhachev, filmed a video warning that Russians who "break the law online and hope to go unpunished" would be "mogging" (in Russian: могнут).

In November 2026, Russian public figure Ekaterina Mizulina posted a message on her Telegram channel congratulating people on National Unity Day, using the slang term in her post: "Happy National Unity Day. When we are united, we can to mog".

=== United States ===
On June 4, 2026, the White House's official X account posted a photo of Donald Trump sitting at a desk in the Oval Office. In the photo, Trump is holding a chart comparing the depth of the renovated pool in front of the Lincoln Memorial. The post was captioned with the word "Mogged". Newsweek explained that, in the context of the post, this means that the pool "outshone" the skyscrapers — that is, it was presented as a decisive victory or superiority in comparison.

=== Other countries ===
During the 2026 Winter Olympics in Milan, American figure skater Alysa Liu joked that her main goal in the competition was to "mog" her rivals.
