= Looksmaxxing =

Neologism from online manosphere communities

Looksmaxxing (/ˈlʊksˌmæksɪŋ/; LUUKS-MAK-sing) is an online self-improvement practice in the manosphere that focuses on maximizing male physical attractiveness. The term is a neologism which was coined on incel message boards in the 2010s. Previously, the phrase had limited usage on obscure internet forums of the incelosphere, but was popularized on TikTok by primarily male content creators in the 2020s. While also based on white supremacy, the term has commonly been associated with the black pill ideology, which espouses that female sexual selection is primarily based on external physical qualities such as height and facial attractiveness, while qualities such as kindness and personality are ignored or even cause rejection. Looksmaxxing methods range from benign practices such as skincare routines and gym use, to more extreme interventions such as invasive cosmetic surgery and injection of anabolic steroids, human growth hormone and other peptides.

Commentators generally criticize the concept as being judgemental and harmful to its practitioners ("looksmaxxers"). Communities and influencers associated with the practice are described as rating individual's appearance without concern for their overall well-being which can lead to negative mental health outcomes such as body dysmorphia and suicidal ideation. The increasing popularity of the concept has also led to concerns over its potential to promote hegemonic masculinity. Although looksmaxxers use scientific and medical terminology, the practice is based heavily on anecdotal evidence unsupported by mainstream medicine, and certain aspects—particularly the PSL scale used by practitioners to rate their appearance—are considered pseudoscientific.

== Overview ==
=== Softmaxxing ===
"Softmaxxing" is a subset of looksmaxxing that refers to non-invasive and simple practices used to achieve minor improvements to one's appearance. These include skincare, grooming, clothing choices, and general fitness such as weight management and exercise. Additional less conventional practices are also included in the scope of softmaxxing; popular examples include "mewing", which involves suctioning one's tongue to the roof of the mouth with the intention of an improved jaw and facial structure, and "NoFap", where one abstains from masturbation for perceived physical and mental benefits. Such practices come up more often in looksmaxxing discourse due to their niche nature.

Practices associated with softmaxxing were previously popularized among men by magazines such as GQ, Esquire, and Men's Health, which share skincare and hairstyle advice.

=== Hardmaxxing ===
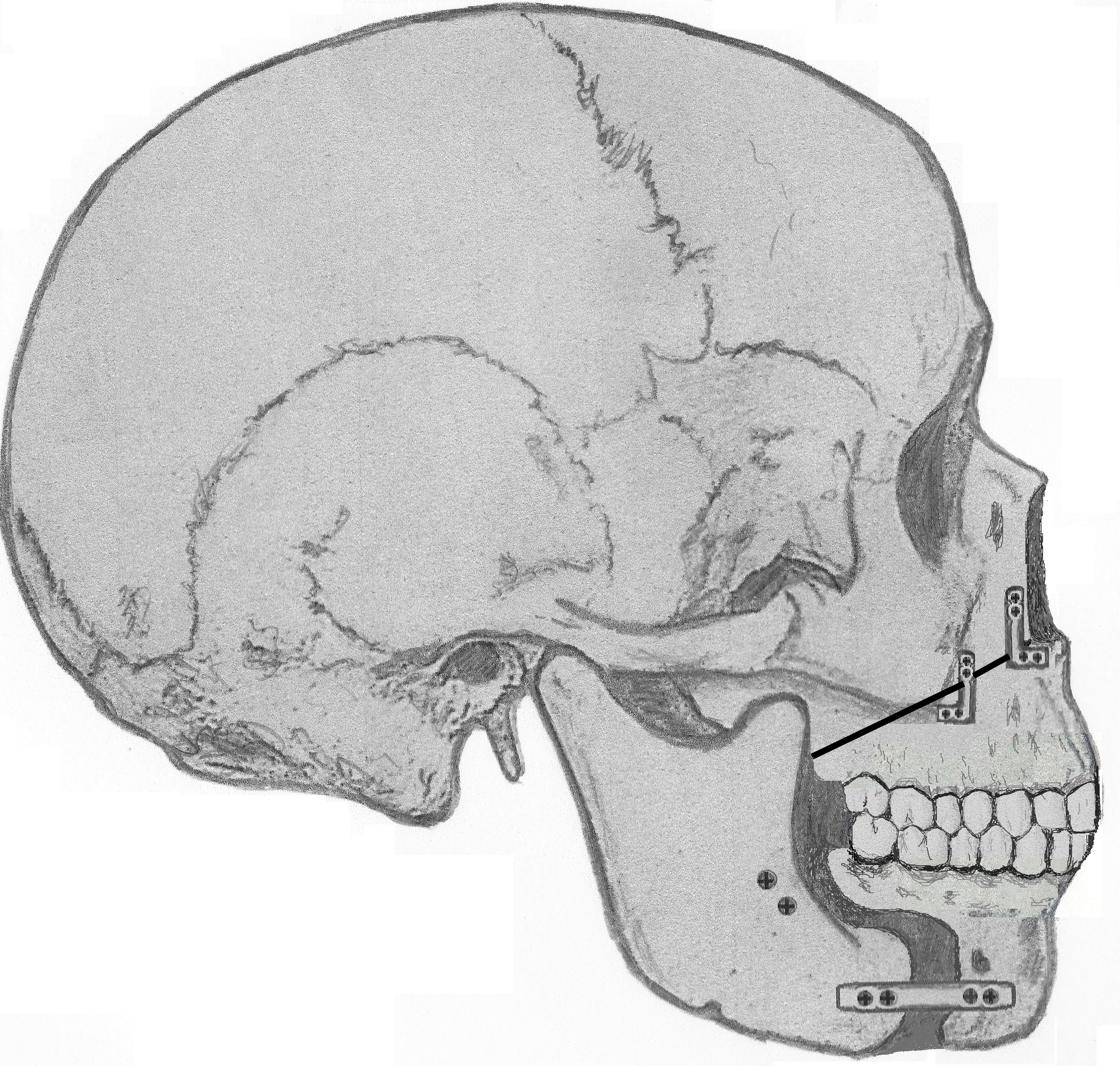
Maxillofacial surgery is frequently proposed and discussed among looksmaxxers.

Hardmaxxing is a subset of looksmaxxing that refers to more extreme practices in order to achieve significant changes to one's appearance and facial structure. These include off-label or unauthorized use of substances (such as anabolic steroids, peptides, human growth hormone, aromatase inhibitors, weight loss medications, etc.) to achieve a taller stature, more masculine appearance and greater muscle mass; extreme dieting to the point of starvation to achieve a low body fat level; and skin whitening to achieve a lighter skin tone, which is interpreted as being more desirable; and undergoing cosmetic surgeries, such as jaw surgery and rhinoplasty.

Additionally, a practice known as bonesmashing, which refers to the act of hitting one's face against objects such as a hammer in order to create a "chiselled look", is often described when discussing looksmaxxing. This practice is considered an inside joke and is rarely done. Sources label it as misinformation.

==== Peptides ====
The peptide GHK-Cu in particular has gained virality. While nominally applied topically, it is injected directly into the skin, obtained usually through unregulated means. GHK-Cu in topical applications is also used particularly in Softmaxxing as various studies have shown this peptide to improve skin tightness, reduce wrinkles, and aid in sun damage prevention in addition to various other skin related benefits.

GLP-1 is another common peptide in the looksmaxxing sphere. The effects of GLP-1 have been researched to improve conditions such as obesity and diabetes type 2. People without these conditions obtain the peptide through other methods such as the grey market where unregulated and non FDA-approved GLP-1 can be found.

==== Pentastack ====
The pentastack is a hazardous five-drug mixture discussed in looksmaxxing communities that combines powerful stimulants and severe central nervous system depressants. It consists of: Adderall, dextromethorphan, pregabalin, ketamine and BDO (1,4-Butanediol). It has been compared to the date rape drug Rohypnol by Vanity Fair.

In 2026, Androgenic, an Australian looksmaxxing influencer, revealed the "pentastack", a list of five substances which he uses while livestreaming. Adderall, Dextromethorphan and Ketamine are fairly common off-the-shelf pharmaceuticals with legitimate medical use. Pregabalin (under the brand name Lyrica) is a drug used to treat epilepsy and other nervous damages, and has sedative effects. 1,4-Butanediol (with street names like "Bute", "One Comma Four" or "Liquid Fantasy") is a chemical that exerts similar euphoric effects to its metabolite, GABA analogue gamma-hydroxybutyrate (GHB). BDO can cause seizures, nausea, vomiting, and withdrawal symptoms can potentially cause death.

On April 14, 2026, looksmaxxing influencer Clavicular overdosed on a Kick livestream with Androgenic, after he took a combination of the pentastack. The livestream ended, and he was rushed to the hospital. After Androgenic's pentastack video resurfaced, he defended his consumption, claiming it was less harmful than mixing alcohol with cocaine, and describing it as his: "high IQ healthy sustainable drug stack".

=== Other concepts ===
Some that partake in looksmaxxing also look for others to rate their appearance, with some engaging in anonymous message boards associated with incel subculture. This rating, together with one's perceived status and wealth, has been considered to be one's "sexual market value" (also known as SMV). The PSL (Perceived Sexual Levels) ranking is strictly based on looks, which gives men a numerical rating then sorts men into seven categories: "subhuman or sub-3", "low tier normie", "mid tier normie", "high tier normie", "Chadlite", "Chad", and "giga Chad". Those who look to determine someone's attractiveness usually check for a variety of facial features. One of the features checked for in men is "hunter eyes", which refers to a positive canthal tilt, little to no upper eyelid exposure and low-set eyebrows, resembling the eye area of a predatorial animal. Additional features checked for include hollow cheeks, a defined jawline and "pursed lips". In order to achieve these features, some perform acts such as the aforementioned "mewing", rubbing against the orbital area, or getting surgery. A noticeable increase in one's status or looks due to the aforementioned softmaxxing techniques is known as ascension.

On some incel forums, users deemed below average may be harassed, including being told to take their own lives. Additional terms have been coined by these communities in an effort to "dominate others". These phrases include "mogging", which refers to asserting dominance over another person based on their appearance, and being "Y-pilled", which refers to one viewing themselves as more masculine than the other and is a spin on the phrase "redpilled". The term also comes from "AMOG", which is a new acronym for "alpha male of the group". Additionally, practitioners of looksmaxxing may attempt to mog each other in social settings, through physical attractiveness, financials, or social status.

In the 2020s, the smellmaxxing trend became an offshoot of looksmaxxing.

== History ==
The practice originated within online incel and manosphere communities during the 2010s, where discussions attributed sexual success to the perceived genetic advantages held by certain men, calling them "Chads". The three main forums in which looksmaxxing originated from, concomitant with the black pill ideology, were the websites PUAHate.com, Sluthate.com, and Lookism.net (called the "PSL Forums", taken from their names). This overarching online community came to be known as the "PSL community". Along with their focus on looksmaxxing and black pill ideas, these websites also rejected mainstream dating culture and feminist perspectives. Looksmaxxing was framed as a strategy for social recognition. It especially involved the adaptation to the perceived dominant male beauty standards, as a means to attract women. These forums established their own measuring unit to rate looks, titled the PSL Scale (standing for "Perceived Sexual Levels", but also an abbreviation for each of the three main forums, in order).

The PSL scale diverges from the traditional scale "x out of ten" numerical attractiveness rating system, in that it uses a rigorously hierarchical and systematic framework used to measure only facial attractiveness. It typically uses a scale from 1–8, and it was strictly designed with the aim of interpreting how women perceive men. Many of the terms and jargon associated with looksmaxxing find their origins on these forums. The three "PSL Forums" are now defunct, yet looksmaxxing spread beyond manosphere communities and entered broader online culture, gaining popularity on platforms such as TikTok during the early 2020s.

In contrast to earlier discussions on message boards, which were more closely associated with the black pilled worldview, early TikTok content often framed looksmaxxing in terms of self-improvement, sometimes incorporating self-deprecating humor. However, by the mid 2020s, the black pill ideology became increasingly associated with the practice in mainstream discourse. Certain online influencers, such as Kick livestreamer Braden Peters, a.k.a. "Clavicular", have also been linked to the promotion of more extreme forms of looksmaxxing and black pill ideology.

== Criticism ==
Looksmaxxing has been connected to incel sub-culture since its origins within it. Writing for The Conversation, senior lecturer and researcher Jamilla Rosdahl of the Australian College of Applied Psychology considers that the practice converts young men into incels, as a result of TikTok algorithms. On the popularity of looksmaxxing amongst young people overall, Rosdahl attributes it to the amount of "control" one has with the process, in contrast to the uncertainty of real world political issues. In some cases, men involved in the practice have reported benefits such as getting a girlfriend, as well as positive affirmation from their peers after improving their looks. Albeit such praise is invariably mixed with critique, which helps maintain a common outlook with less attractive members, who all feel subordinate to the masculine ideal.

Several methods of looksmaxxing have been criticized by doctors and dismissed as misinformation, including mewing and bonesmashing. Regarding mewing, researchers have argued that evidence supporting any change in facial structure is lacking. Facial surgeons have criticized bonesmashing saying it includes the risk for fractures, facial misalignment, neurovascular injuries, facial deformity, and alterations in vision. Physicians have been advised to help patients interested in looksmaxxing to distinguish between safe beauty practices and harmful practices, suggesting to patients to only conduct looksmaxxing practices when done in a medically viable manner. Peptides and certain trending variations have been under scrutiny such as GLP - 1, where the possible risks associated with this peptide include but are not limited to stomach, pancreas, and gallbladder issues.The FDA has also issued a warning on the injectible version of GHK-Cu.

Clavicular's system of rating looksmaxxing that he promotes in interviews and on social media is the PSL scale, which gives men a numerical rating then sorts men into three tiers: "subhuman", "normie", and "Chad". In her New Yorker criticism, journalist Becca Rothfeld finds distaste in the use of terms such as "subhuman" and the culture surrounding looksmaxxing which she believes propagates the use of derrogatory racial language. She also cites a recent interview in which Clavicular "approvingly notes that Brad Pitt 'mogs' Mother Teresa".

A study by Micheal Halpin and colleagues argues that looksmaxxing promotes a hegemonic masculine gaze on male bodies and that the looksmaxxing community revolves around male supremacy and hegemonic masculinity.

== See also ==
- Body image
- Halo effect
- Height discrimination
- List of pseudoscience topics
- Lookism
- -maxxing
- Masculinity
- Matching hypothesis
- Muscle dysmorphia
- Physiognomy
- Pretty privilege
