= Incel =

Online subculture

An incel (/ˈɪnsɛl/ IN-sel; an abbreviation of "involuntary celibate" or "involuntarily celibate"), is a member of an online subculture of mostly heterosexual men who define themselves as unable to find a romantic or sexual partner despite desiring one. The incel subculture came to wider public attention in the 2010s with the banning of controversial subreddit r/incels and a series of mass murders committed by men who either identified as incels or held similar ideologies, including Elliot Rodger and Alek Minassian.

The incel subculture's online discourse is characterized by social rejection, social isolation, resentment, hostile sexism, anti-feminism, sexual objectification and dehumanization of women, misogyny, homophobia, misanthropy, self-pity and self-loathing, racism, a sense of entitlement to sex, nihilism, rape culture, and the endorsement of sexual and non-sexual violence against women and the sexually active. Incels tend to blame both women and the feminist movement for their inability to find a partner. They often attribute their romantic failures to biological determinism and women's perceived hypergamy, where women are said to have an innate and unchangeable preference for mating with only the most physically attractive males (nicknamed "Chads"). Classified as part of the manosphere, an online association of anti-feminist and male supremacist groups that includes incels along with men's rights activists (MRAs), men going their own way (MGTOW) and pick-up artists (PUAs), most incels identify with the "black pill", a more nihilistic version of the manosphere's belief in the "red pill" that argues men are an oppressed group in a society dominated by feminism. The "black pill" refers to the fatalistic belief that society is dominated by women and physically attractive men or "alpha males". Incels believe it is impossible for unattractive men to escape this social hierarchy.

Incel communities have been criticized by scholars, government officials, and others for their misogyny, endorsement and encouragement of violence and extremism. Over time the subculture has become associated with extremism and misogynist terrorism, and since 2014 there have been multiple mass killings, mostly in North America, perpetrated by self-identified incels, as well as other instances of violence or attempted violence.

The Southern Poverty Law Center (SPLC) describes incels as "part of the online male supremacist ecosystem" that is included in their list of hate groups. The Global Internet Forum to Counter Terrorism (GIFCT) states that "the incel community shares a misogynistic ideology of women as being genetically inferior to men, driven by their sexual desire to reproduce with genetically superior males, thereby excluding unattractive men such as themselves" which "exhibits all of the hallmarks of an extremist ideology". GIFCT states that incel beliefs combine a wish for a mythical past where all men were entitled to sex from subordinated women, a sense of predestined personal failure, and nihilism, making it a dangerous ideology. Estimates of the overall size of the subculture vary greatly, ranging from thousands to hundreds of thousands of individuals.

== History and organization ==
=== Background ===
The first website to use the term "incel" was Alana's Involuntary Celibacy Project, a blog founded in 1997 (Note: Some media have incorrectly dated the founding of the website to 1993, the date of a personal interaction that later inspired Alana to design the page.) by a female university student living in Toronto known as Alana, in order to document her own struggles with dating. The site became a hub for those with similar experiences, functioning as an informal support group that featured discussion forums, article sharing, and a mailing list. The project served a diverse community of people of different ages, genders, and sexual orientations who had difficulty forming sexual or romantic relationships due to influences beyond their control such as shyness. Alana originally used the abbreviation "invcel" for "involuntarily celibate", later shortening it to "incel". Her website was intended for "anybody of any gender who was lonely, had never had sex or who hadn't had a relationship in a long time". She later said, "I was trying to create a movement that was open to anybody and everybody."

During her college years and afterward, Alana realized she was bisexual and became more comfortable with her identity. As her own dating life improved, Alana stopped maintaining the website, passing the site's contents on to someone else she did not know around the year 2000. Beginning in the mid-2000s, incel discourse came to be dominated by men who saw themselves as lacking in traditional masculinity and who expressed nihilistic and anti-feminist views. After self-described incel Elliot Rodger committed a shooting spree in 2014, killing six people before committing suicide, Alana discovered that the community had splintered into male-only groups whose sexual frustrations were often directed at women. In 2018, Alana said of her project: "It definitely wasn't a bunch of guys blaming women for their problems. That's a pretty sad version of this phenomenon that's happening today. Things have changed in the last 20 years".

After learning that the perpetrator of the 2014 Isla Vista killings was being glorified by parts of the incel subculture, Alana wrote: "Like a scientist who invented something that ended up being a weapon of war, I can't uninvent this word, nor restrict it to the nicer people who need it". She expressed regret at the change from her original intent of creating an "inclusive community" for people of all genders who were sexually deprived due to social awkwardness, marginalization, or mental illness.

=== Forums ===
In 2003, the message board love-shy.com was founded as a place for people who felt perpetually rejected or were extremely shy with potential partners to discuss their situations. It was less strictly moderated than its counterpart, IncelSupport, which was also founded in the 2000s. While IncelSupport welcomed men and women and banned misogynistic posts, love-shy.com's userbase was overwhelmingly male. Over the next decade, the membership of love-shy.com and online fringe right-wing communities such as 4chan increasingly overlapped.

In the 2000s, incel communities became more extremist as they adopted behaviors common on forums such as 4chan and Reddit, where extremist posts were encouraged as a way to achieve visibility. As incel forums became more extremist and misogynist, inceldom came to be seen as a permanent part of one's identity, rather than a temporary circumstance. According to Bruce Hoffman and colleagues writing in Studies in Conflict & Terrorism, as "edgy" and extremist statements became more prevalent in incel communities, so too did extremist trolling and "shitposting".

The r/incels subreddit later became a particularly active incel community. It was known as a place where men blamed women for their inceldom, sometimes advocated for rape or other forms of violence, and were misogynistic and often racist. Reddit banned the r/incels subreddit in 2017 following a new policy that prohibited "content that encourages, glorifies, incites, or calls for violence or physical harm against an individual or a group of people", adopted in October 2017. At the time of the ban, the community had around 40,000 members.

In the 2010s, the subculture came to wider public notice with the banning of r/incels, and when a series of mass murders were committed by men who either identified as members of the subculture or shared similar ideologies. Increased interest in incel communities has been attributed to feelings of "aggrieved entitlement" among some men who feel they are being denied rights they deserve and blame women for their lack of sex.

The incel community continued to inhabit Reddit in other subreddits, such as on the subreddit r/braincels. Although the tone of the subreddit was similar to r/incels, moderators of the r/braincels forum said that they did not endorse, support, or glorify violence or violent people, a distinction they made from the subject matter of its predecessor that resulted in its being banned from Reddit. On September 30, 2019, the r/braincels subreddit was banned after Reddit again broadened its banning policy.

Since around 2019, some self-identified incels have attempted to redefine their views to appear more mainstream, by writing blog posts and articles on subject-specific wikis and forums. These reject the more open expressions of misogyny within other segments of the subculture, highlighting the heterogeneity of incel communities, and reframing incels not as an online subculture but as those experiencing a life circumstance that applies even to individuals who are not members of the subculture. In 2021, M. Kelly wrote for the Political Research Associates think tank that these attempts to redefine themselves contradicted the communities' self-identifications and moderation strategies, where members regularly challenge other users' "legitimacy" as incels, but have accepted as members individuals with sexual experience who nonetheless shared similar political ideologies.

Incel communities began to migrate away from shared platforms and toward their own closed forums dedicated specifically to the subject. Former users of several banned subreddits migrated to the standalone website Incels.is. The site was founded in November 2017 as Incels.me (later Incels.co) after both /r/incels and /r/braincels were banned due to violations of Reddit's content policies. Incels.me was suspended after approximately one year for violating the domain registry's anti-abuse policies. Incels.is hosts essentially the same content and membership as the previous sites and has over 28,000 members as of December 2024. Participation is limited to those who identify as incels or who accept "black pill" ideology. The site's rules explicitly state that women and LGBT persons will be "banned on sight" and prohibit discussion of sexual or romantic encounters. As of 2022, Incels.is hosts the majority of incel-related discussion online. The site also has a wiki describing the "scientific black pill" among other topics. The wiki cites academic research to promote misogynistic arguments, frequently citing single studies, ignoring counter-claims, or selectively citing examples.

Incels.me was composed of public and registered message boards for self-described incels to discuss their personal experiences. Moderators banned women and LGBTQ individuals from joining, stating that the forum was oriented towards straight men. In 2019, Vox stated that Incels.co (formerly Incels.me) had a culture of praising mass killers, which was treated lightly by the site's admins. In his 2020 book Culture Warlords, journalist Tal Lavin described the culture of Incels.co as one of "one-upmanship", "barroom boast-off" and shock content. In 2023, Rolling Stone described a vindictive culture on Incels.is, giving an example of an ex-moderator who entered a romantic relationship and was subsequently rejected by site members as a "fake incel".

Incels.co was founded and run by two individuals known only by their online pseudonyms, who also operated a discussion forum devoted to suicide. In September 2022, the UK-based Center for Countering Digital Hate (CCDH) published a report about the largest dedicated incel forum based on monthly visits, and a network of other sites run by the same two pseudonymous individuals. The Washington Post, The New York Times, and the CCDH identified them as Uruguay-based Diego Joaquín Galante and United States–based Lamarcus Small. In December 2021, The New York Times reported that it had identified 45 people, individually, who died in connection to a website called Sanctioned Suicide, and estimated that the true number was likely much higher. The Times reporters discovered that Galante and Small created and operated the suicide website, in addition to their several incel forums. The CCDH reported that Galante and Small also maintained forums for online communities dedicated to body image and unemployment.

== Ideology ==
Incel beliefs express gender essentialism that assumes men's superiority over women and endorses traditional gender roles that privilege men. Incel rhetoric invokes an idealized patriarchal society in which couples adhered to these traditional roles, married early, and were strictly monogamous. This nostalgic vision of a utopian past, focused especially on an idealized version of the 1950s, is shared by broader conservative and right-wing populist narratives. During this mythologized "golden age", incels imagine that all men had nearly unencumbered access to women as romantic partners, thereby reducing the competition for sex. Incels often disagree about precisely when this golden age occurred, but they concur that it was gradually destroyed by feminism, the sexual revolution, women's liberation, and technological progress, giving women unearned dominance and status within the sexual economy. As a result, incels tend to blame both women and the feminist movement for their inability to find a partner.

Incel discourse is characterized by resentment, hostile sexism, anti-feminism, sexual objectification and dehumanization of women, misogyny, homophobia, misanthropy, self-pity and self-loathing, racism, a sense of entitlement to sex, nihilism, rape culture, and the endorsement of sexual and non-sexual violence against women and the sexually active. (Note: Resentment, misogyny; Hatred; Hostile sexism; Anti-feminism; Homophobia; Misanthropy; Nihilism; Self-pity; Self-loathing; Racism, white supremacy; Entitlement to sex; Sexual objectification, dehumanization of women; Rape culture and sexual violence; Endorsement of violence against women and sexually active people) Discussions often revolve around the belief that men are entitled to sex from women. In response, incels often advocate some form of coercion, rape, or a return to enforced monogamy under strict patriarchal rule. The elimination of women's rights is favored in order to ensure women's dependency on men, effecting a return to traditional gender roles. Some incels also advocate for sexual slavery, punishment for female promiscuity, redistribution of women, and violence against feminists.

Incels have been found to attribute their perceived lower social status to such factors as (lack of) neurotypicality and physical stature that contribute to a traditional performance of masculinity. Incels blame modern feminism for their failure to achieve traditional masculine dominance, believing themselves to be victims of women's empowerment despite their innate superiority over women. Their shared victim mentality encourages incels to fatalistically celebrate their failures and discourage each other from seeking romantic success. Hopelessness is a defining factor of incel beliefs, seen in the common refrain "it's over", and repeated calls to "LDAR" (lay down and rot), which have become popular mantras throughout incel communities.

Some studies have found that loneliness and social isolation are key aspects of inceldom. Other common topics include idleness, unhappiness, suicide, sexual surrogates, and prostitution. A 2025 U.S. study found involuntary celibacy was associated with criticism of liberalism.

=== "Red pill" and "black pill" ===
The metaphor of the "red pill" originates from the movie The Matrix in which the protagonist must choose whether to remain in a world of illusion (taking the blue pill), or to see the world as it really is (taking the red pill). In the wider manosphere, an online association of anti-feminist and male supremacist groups that includes incels along with men's rights activists (MRAs), men going their own way (MGTOW) and pick-up artists (PUAs), the "red pill" refers to the belief that male privilege is a feminist myth and that contemporary society instead favors women while oppressing men. To be "red-pilled" means to awaken to the realization that contemporary society has been engineered by feminists to reduce men's rights, and that men must fight against feminist brainwashing. Endorsing these beliefs means that one has "taken the red pill".

The concept of the "black pill" (Note: The term "black pill" originated on the incel-related blog Omega Virgin Revolt in 2012.) or "blackpill" developed on incel forums as a more nihilistic version of the "red pill". Expanding upon the red pill belief that men are an oppressed group, black pill ideology uses pseudoscientific claims to argue that heterosexual dating, and society in general, exist primarily to benefit women and physically attractive men or "alpha males". The black pill portrays women as hardwired to find only certain masculine traits attractive. Both worldviews portray women as manipulative, superficial, and hypergamous. Incels use the term hypergamy to argue that women seek high-status men in order to increase the social, economic and genetic potential of their offspring. In this view of the "sexual marketplace", women desire physically attractive "alpha" men ("Chads") for sex, or alternatively partner with "beta" men willing to provide financial security ("beta bux"), exploiting a perceived disparity in male and female sexual value or sexual economic value. Most incels subscribe to the "black pill", believing it is impossible for unattractive men to escape this social hierarchy. Incels therefore perceive themselves to be an oppressed minority, despite being mostly white males with some degree of social privilege. Incels commonly identify as either "redpilled" or "blackpilled", whereas non-incels who uphold mainstream views about romance and dating ("normies" and "alphas") are seen as being "bluepilled".

A diagram of hypergamy used by incels, which has since became an internet meme.

Black pill ideology is defined by biological determinism, in contrast to ideas of personal agency and self-improvement often associated with red pill beliefs. Selected ideas from evolutionary psychology are used to reinforce the idea of "sexual market value" in a mating system controlled by the most desirable women. Those who subscribe to red pill ideology believe they can use their knowledge of women's hypergamy to achieve success in the dating market and increase their own sexual market value, such as by improving their social skills or physical appearance through surgery or other body modifications, known as "looksmaxxing". However, according to black pill ideology, improving one's looks is futile, since dating success is entirely determined by genetics, keeping most men from achieving sexual dominance.

The black pill promotes fatalism and defeatism for men perceived to be unattractive. According to the black pill, as long as women are able to freely choose their sexual partners, genetically inferior men will only find a wife once she is past her sexual prime, who will only use the man for financial security. Researcher Angus Lindsay writes that the nihilistic worldview of the black pill appears to have influenced terroristic behavior by incels who have attempted violent retributions against those who are perceived to hold a higher social status.

Hoffman et al. write that "'Taking the black pill' is critical to the incel identity, since it means recognizing 'inceldom' as a permanent condition". Aja Romano writes at Vox that black pill ideology "unites all incels". According to the Anti-Defamation League (ADL), there are some incels who believe in the red pill and others who believe in the black pill. Those who believe they can improve their chances with women are adherents to the "red pill", whereas only incels who believe they have little to no power to change their position in society or chances with women are blackpilled. The ADL writes that, among incels, the beliefs summarized as "red pill" center around the idea that feminism has unbalanced society to favor women and give them too much power. Redpilled incels believe they have the opportunity to fight back against this system which disadvantages them, which they do by trying to make themselves more attractive to women. Conversely, blackpilled incels are those who believe they can do nothing to change their situation. The ADL writes, "This is where the incel movement takes on characteristics of a death cult". Those who have taken the black pill are left with few options, says the ADL: giving up on life (referred to by incels as "LDAR", an abbreviation for "lie down and rot"), dying by suicide, or committing mass violence.

On Reddit, notable figures within the incel community are described as having taken the black pill, such as the mass murderer Elliot Rodger. On the former incel subreddit r/braincels, the term "blackpill" was used for meme images that criticized women as egocentric, cruel, and shallow. The black pill has been described by Vox correspondent Zack Beauchamp as "a profoundly sexist ideology that ... amounts to a fundamental rejection of women's sexual emancipation, labeling women shallow, cruel creatures who will choose only the most attractive men if given the choice".

Incels validate their beliefs through uncritical interpretations of studies in evolutionary biology and evolutionary psychology, as well as studies undertaken by dating sites. They dismiss those who do not accept blackpill ideology as uninformed and unwilling to engage with such research. Self-identified incels also support their beliefs through references to psychology, sociology, and economics. Incels often exaggerate the importance of studies that support their ideology, while dismissing any findings that contradict it. Collections of studies used to support incel beliefs are sometimes called the "scientific blackpill". Researchers at the Institute for Strategic Dialogue have described incels' appeals to science as part of a strategy of "argument by exhaustion", where "large numbers of references of dubious quality are made to back up questionable assertions". Some evolutionary psychology researchers have disputed incels' interpretations of studies from their field, such as the strategic pluralism (or "double-mating strategy") hypothesis.

Self-identified incels regularly endorse the ideas of women's genetic inferiority, "female hypergamy", the "80/20 rule" (an application of the Pareto principle, in which incels assert that 80% of women desire the top 20% of most desirable men, and the "just be white" (JBW) theory, which posits that white people face the fewest obstacles to relationships and sex.

Self-identified incels also believe that people seeking a romantic or sexual partner participate in a cruel, mercenary, and Darwinian sexual selection, wherein incels are genetically unfit and where women hold an advantage for reasons ranging from feminism to the use of cosmetics. Incels may attribute their lack of sexual success to factors such as shyness, sex-segregated work environments, negative body image, penis size, or their physical appearance, and commonly believe that the only thing more important than looks in improving a man's eligibility as a prospective partner is wealth. Some justify their beliefs based on the works of fringe social psychologist Brian Gilmartin and clinical psychologist Jordan Peterson.

=== Extremism ===
As of 2022, research indicates growth in extremist beliefs and online radicalization among incels, as well as the potential for forum users to become seen as martyrs by their peers after committing acts of violence. Research has similarly found that virulent misogyny often found on incel forums serves to justify the use of violence, particularly against women. Incel communities became more extremist and focused on violence from the late 2010s. This has been attributed to factors including influences from overlapping online hate groups and the rise of the alt-right and white supremacist groups. The misogynistic and violent rhetoric often found in these communities, including exhortations to violence, has led to them being banned from several social media platforms and web hosting services.

Incel communities continue to exist on more lenient platforms including 4chan, 8chan, and Gab, as well as on web forums created specifically for the topic. More extremist self-identified incels have increasingly migrated to obscure locations including gaming chat services (such as Discord) and the dark web to avoid site shutdowns and the self-censorship that has developed among some incel communities as an effort to avoid drawing scrutiny from law enforcement or website service providers.

There has been debate over whether to consider violent attacks carried out by incels as a form of terrorism. Beginning in 2018 and into the 2020s, the incel ideology has been described by North American governments and researchers as a terrorism threat, and law enforcement have issued warnings about the subculture. In May 2019, an American man was sentenced to up to five years in prison for making terrorist threats, posting on social media, "I'm planning on shooting up a public place ... killing as many girls as I see". In September 2019, the U.S. Army warned soldiers about the possibility of violence at movie theaters showing the Joker film, after "disturbing and very specific chatter" was found in conversations among self-identified incels on the dark web.

A January 2020 report by the Texas Department of Public Safety warned that the incel movement was an "emerging domestic terrorism threat" that "could soon match, or potentially eclipse, the level of lethalness demonstrated by other domestic terrorism types". A 2020 paper published by Bruce Hoffman and colleagues in Studies in Conflict & Terrorism concluded that "the violent manifestations of the ideology pose a new terrorism threat, which should not be dismissed or ignored by domestic law enforcement agencies".

John Horgan, a psychology professor at Georgia State University who received a grant from the U.S. Department of Homeland Security to study the incel subculture, explained why the incel ideology equates to terrorism: "the fact that incels are aspiring to change things up in a bigger, broader ideological sense, that's, for me, what make it a classic example of terrorism. That's not saying all incels are terrorists. But violent incel activity is, unquestionably, terrorism in my view".

In February 2020, an attack in Toronto that was allegedly motivated by incel ideologies became the first such act of violence to be prosecuted as terrorism, and the Royal Canadian Mounted Police stated that they consider the incel subculture to be an "Ideologically Motivated Violent Extremist (IMVE)" movement. In 2021, Jacob Ware wrote in Counter Terrorist Trends and Analyses that analysis of incels has been focused within the United States and Canada due to the concentration of incel-motivated attacks in those countries. In March 2022, the United States Secret Service's National Threat Assessment Center, published a case study titled "Hot Yoga Tallahassee: A Case Study of Misogynistic Extremism", to examine the 2018 Tallahassee shooting at a hot yoga studio and draw attention to "the specific threat posed by misogynist extremism."

=== Promotion of violence ===
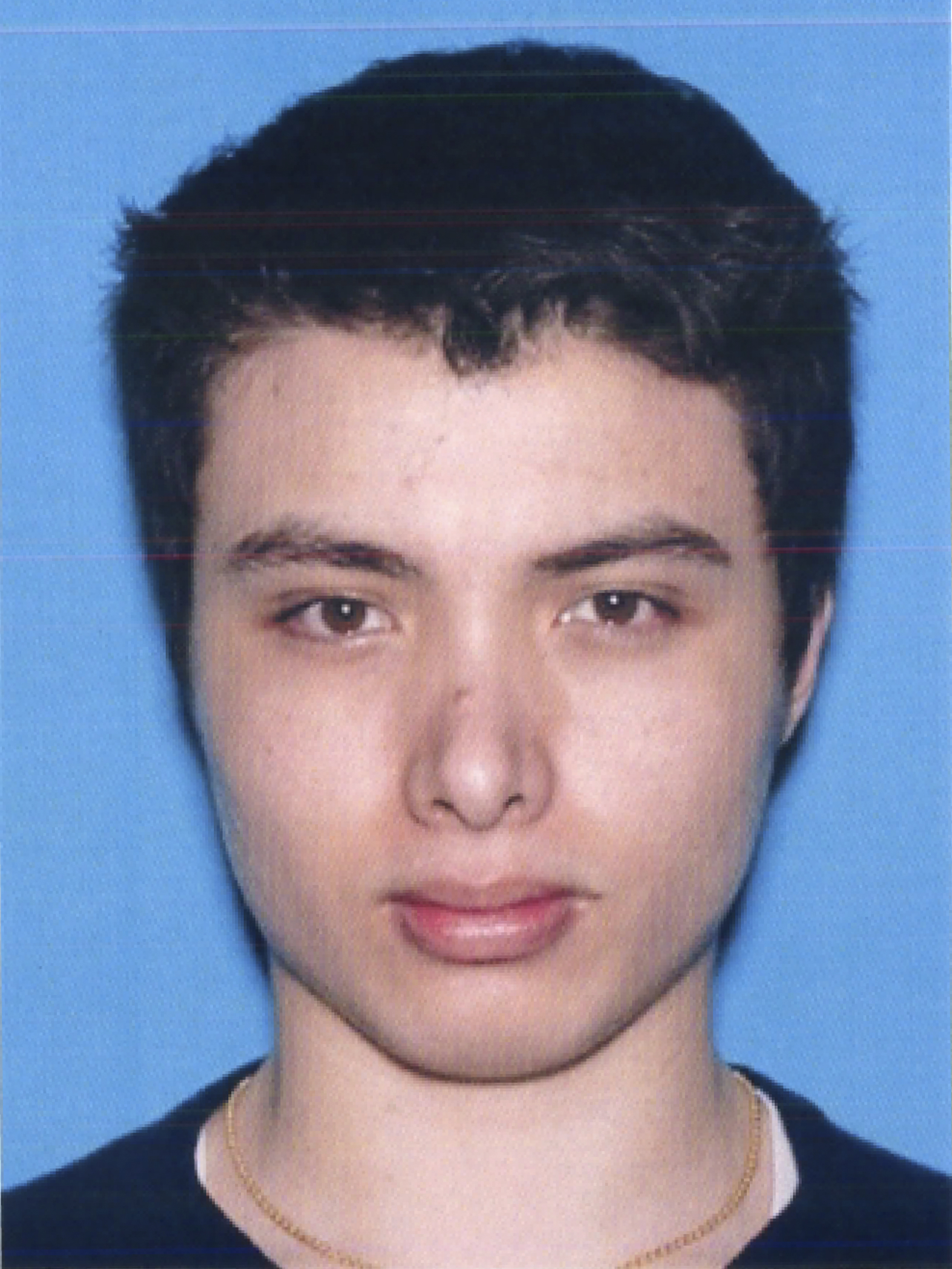
Many incels glorify Elliot Rodger and consider him their "saint".

Characteristic of incel discourse is the justification of violent acts in order to re-establish male supremacy over Western societies, which they believe to be ruled by women. Some discussions in incel communities endorse violence against sexually active women and more sexually successful men, harassment of women, and suicide. According to the Anti-Defamation League, they form the most violent community within the manosphere. In some incel communities, it is common for posts to glorify violence by self-identified incels such as Elliot Rodger (perpetrator of the 2014 Isla Vista killings) and Alek Minassian (perpetrator of the 2018 Toronto van attack), as well as by those they believe shared their ideology such as Marc Lépine (perpetrator of the 1989 École Polytechnique massacre), Seung-Hui Cho (perpetrator of the 2007 Virginia Tech shooting), and George Sodini (perpetrator of the 2009 Collier Township shooting).

The BBC has described Rodger as "the founding father of the incel ideology". On incel discussion forums, Rodger is often referred to as ther "patron saint", with memes of his face superimposed onto paintings of Christian icons. Some incels consider him to be the progenitor of today's online incel communities.

Some within these communities view violence as the only solution to what they see as societal oppression and abuse against them and speak frequently of incel "uprisings" and "revolts". Others take the more nihilistic view that nothing will change society, even violent acts, and focus their efforts on constructing a scientific justification for this nihilism. Some support the idea of violence as revenge on society, without the hope it will lead to societal change.

Researchers William Costello and David Buss have questioned the degree of violence found in incel communities, suggesting that "extreme inceldom looks more like suicidality than violence toward others". Some violent posts may be motivated by status-seeking behavior by individuals on forums, rather than a desire to promote violence. A 2021 study found that the overwhelming majority of self-identified incels themselves do not think that incel groups promote violence. A 2022 study found that most self-identified incels surveyed (79%) rejected violence.

==== Sexual violence ====
A subgroup of self-identified incels who frequent websites founded by Nathan Larson, who was a perennial political candidate and active participant in incel communities, work deliberately to convince other self-identified incels that they are justified in raping women if they are rejected sexually. Some self-identified incels describe women's sexual rejection of them as "reverse rape", a phenomenon they consider to be equally harmful as rape.

A September 2022 report by the Center for Countering Digital Hate, about the largest dedicated incel forum, found that users posted about rape once every 29 minutes during their study period, and used the word "kill" 1,181 times in one month. During the study period, 89% of forum users expressed that they support rape in general. According to the report, some posters on the forum try to normalize the idea of child rape, and more than half the total forum during their study period supported pedophilia. The report also exposed that the incel forum site operators had changed a forum rule in March 2022, to allow for the sexualization of pubescent minors, narrowing an existing rule to outlaw only the sexualization of "pre-pubescent" minors.

=== Racial beliefs ===
Racism is generally considered to be common on incel forums, though some researchers have questioned its prevalence. In 2019, Jaki et al. estimated that 3 percent of comments on incel forums contained words from a list of racist words identified by the researchers. Some researchers have questioned linguistic analysis of incel forums as the primary methodology for studying the subculture, recommending that future researchers employ qualitative methods such as one-on-one interviews to obtain a more nuanced view and to avoid results being skewed by the prevalence of shitposting on incel forums.

Incels believe that being white makes one more attractive to potential mates, paralleling ideas of race science promoted by the far right. This often encourages racist attacks on Black, indigenous, and people of color (BIPOC) members of incel forums. Such "racepill" ideology portrays whiteness as the most desirable racial classification, often invoked using the phrase "Just be White" (JBW). Incels attempting to appear more white in order to attract a partner call this process "whitemaxxing".

Antisemitic beliefs are regularly found on incel forums, with some posters blaming the rise of feminism on a plot masterminded by Jews to weaken the Western world.

=== In context of related communities ===
Incel communities are a part of the broader manosphere, a loose collection of misogynist and anti-feminist movements that also includes men's rights activists (MRAs), Men Going Their Own Way (MGTOW), pickup artists (PUAs), and fathers' rights groups. Overlapping with far-right ideologies including white nationalism and the alt-right, the disparate groups within the manosphere represent a backlash against feminism, united through their shared belief that men are the victims of a misandrist culture that has been corrupted by feminine values and biased against men. Incels and other manosphere groups believe men are oppressed victims of feminism and in response participate in networked misogyny. The Southern Poverty Law Center classifies incel ideology as a form of male supremacy and incels as part of the "online male supremacist ecosystem", which they began including in their list of hate groups in 2018. Journalist Nellie Bowles writes that incels have "evolved into a male supremacist movement" that believes women should be treated as "sexual objects with few rights".

While the self-identified incels believe they are inferior to the rest of society, often referring to themselves as "subhuman", they also espouse supremacist views: either that they are superior to women, or superior to non-incels in general. A 2019 study published in Terrorism and Political Violence found that self-identified incels believe themselves to be the only ones who are "capable of pro-social values and intelligent enough ('high IQ') to see the truth about the social world". The study determined that they followed a pattern that is typical of extremist groups, ascribing highly negative values to out-groups and positive values to in-groups, with the unusual caveat that despite seeing themselves as psychologically superior, they also view themselves negatively in terms of physical appearance.

Incel communities sometimes overlap with communities such as Men Going Their Own Way, men's rights activism, people who believe they are experiencing "true forced loneliness" (TFL), and pickup artistry, although at least one incel website has expressed hatred for pickup artistry and accused pickup artists and dating coaches of financially exploiting incels. In 2019, media scholar Debbie Ging wrote that incels' discourse around "victimhood and aggrieved entitlement" began on 4chan and has spread into more mainstream groups such as men's rights activists and Men Going Their Own Way.

Incel communities have also been observed to overlap with far-right groups. In 2019, the Centre for Analysis of the Radical Right noted that the subculture is "part of a growing trend of radical-right movements" that are distressed by neoliberalism, especially women's empowerment and immigration. In 2020, Hoffman and colleagues, in Studies in Conflict & Terrorism, stated that "a particularly worrisome trend is how seamlessly the militant incel community has been integrated into the alt-right tapestry, with common grievances and intermingling membership bringing the two extremisms closer together". In March 2021, Der Spiegel reported on the overlap between the incel community and the Feuerkrieg Division, a group modeled after the Atomwaffen Division, a neo-Nazi paramilitary network.

== Jargon ==
Members of incel communities, collectively known online as the "incelosphere", regularly use jargon and distinct slang to reinforce in-group and out-group distinctions between incels and non-incels. Early incel forums used language borrowed from men's rights activists and pickup artists. The term "incel", a portmanteau or shorthand for "involuntary celibate" or "involuntarily celibate" refers to self-identifying members of an online subculture, based around the inability to find a romantic or sexual partner despite desiring one, a state they describe as "inceldom" or "incelibacy". It is sometimes used interchangeably or alongside other terms, such as "love-shy" (describing those with social anxiety or excessive shyness preventing romantic success), "FA" (short for "forever alone"), "unfuckability", "omegas", "betas", "betafags", "the undersexed", or "the sexless". Alana, the coiner of the term "incel", initially considered using other terms such as "perpetually single" or "dating shy".

Incels often use dehumanizing and vulgar terms for women, such as "femoids" (a portmanteau of "female humanoids", sometimes shortened further to "foids") and "roasties" (a reference to the labia minora, which incels falsely believe changes shape and begins to resemble sliced roast beef after a woman becomes sexually active). They refer to attractive, sexually active women as "Stacys" and less attractive sexually active women as "Beckys". Attractive sexually active men are referred to as "Chads". Race-based variations of the "Chad" include "Tyrone" for black men and "Chang" for Asian men. Incels also refer to their belief of women disproportionately preferring wealthy or conventionally attractive men as "hypergamy".

People who are average looking but not incels are "normies". "Mogging" refers to the act of eclipsing another person in terms of physical appearance and thereby undermining them. Looksmaxxing is an attempt at enhancing one's appearance by methods including getting a haircut and dressing nicely, taking steroids and working out, undergoing plastic surgery, or engaging in alternative techniques such as mewing in hopes of improving facial aesthetics. "Ascending" means escaping inceldom, which is believed to be impossible. The abbreviation "NEET" refers to people who do not have jobs and are not attending school: "not in education, employment, or training".

Members of incel communities, whose online platform is known as the incelosphere, use many variations of the term "incel" to refer to subgroups within the community, such as "volcels" (voluntary celibate; someone who chooses to forego sexual intercourse), "fakecels" (those who claim to be incel, but in reality have recently had sex or been in a relationship), and "truecels" (true incels; men who have never had any sexual or romantic encounters). There are a number of race-based variations of the term "incel", which refer to people who believe their race is the reason behind their inability to find a partner, including "currycels" (people of South Asian ancestry) and "ricecels" (those of Chinese or Southeast Asian backgrounds), or collectively, "ethnicels".

"Incel" has also come to be used as an insult against people who do not necessarily identify with the subculture, but who are perceived to be sexually inexperienced, undesirable, or unpopular. American livestreamer Clavicular has helped to popularize incel slang such as "looksmaxxing" and "mogging".

== Demographics ==
Geographic distribution of incels, according to a 2021 study by Speckhard et al
1. Western Europe (32.4%)
2. Northern America (30.9%)
3. Eastern Europe (14.3%)
4. Asia (9.90%)
5. Central and South America (7.70%)
6. Africa (2.20%)
7. Oceania (2.20%)
Self-described racial and ethnic identities of incels
1. White/European (53.3%)
2. Black/African American (9.60%)
3. Middle Eastern/North African (7.00%)
4. Hispanic (7.00%)
5. East Asian (5.10%)
6. Indian (5.10%)
7. Another ethnicity/not sure (12.9%)

Incels are members of an online subculture of mostly heterosexual men who define themselves by their inability to establish sexual and romantic relationships. They are generally educated, often possessing an academic degree. Estimates of the size of incel communities during 2018–2020 varied. It ranged from the thousands, to tens of thousands, to hundreds of thousands. A statistical analysis of the largest incel forum shows that only a few hundred accounts made up the vast majority of forum posts during all of 2021 and most of 2022.

Incel communities are largely made up of emerging adults who feel they have not met their sexual milestones "on time" according to gendered dating norms, resulting in a gender role conflict. Self-identified incels are often described as young and friendless introverts. Incels often describe experiencing financial difficulty, a lack of educational or employment opportunities (including NEET, an abbreviation for "not in employment, education, or training"), and struggles with mental health and self-care. In one study, approximately half of incels surveyed lived with their parents or grandparents, and 17.8% identified as NEET.

Mainstream news media has often described incels as predominantly white. According to Heidi Beirich of the Southern Poverty Law Center, incels are "young, frustrated white males in their late teens into their early twenties who are having a hard time adjusting to adulthood". More recent studies have described incel communities as ethnically diverse. A 2024 study by Alyssa Maryn and colleagues states, "Recent research suggests that common perceptions that Incels are almost all White are inaccurate". In June 2019, Sylvia Jaki and colleagues published a linguistic analysis of the most popular incel forum, arguing that "contrary to what is often reported", there was no definitive evidence that the group is predominantly white. Hoffman and colleagues, publishing in Studies in Conflict & Terrorism, reported that a March 2020 survey of the same forum determined that 55% of respondents self-identified as Caucasian. Incels who are not white often blame their race for their celibacy, using the acronym "JBW" (Just be white) to sardonically express the perceived advantages white men have in attracting women.

A 2024 survey of self-identified incels by researchers from the University of Texas found that incels tended to be slightly center-left. They were significantly left in questions about homosexuality, corporate profits and welfare benefits. In a 2022 study, the University of Texas researchers ran a poll of self-reported incels, which found that 63.58% of those who responded identified as white, a smaller percentage than non-incels in the study. They found that 45% of incels who responded leaned to the left on the political spectrum. 17.5% were centrists, and 38.9% leaned to the right, showing no differences between the incel and the control group of the study. A 2025 survey found that incels tended to consider "feminists" and the "political left" at-large to be "enemies" of the incel community.

Self-identified incels are mainly located in North America and Europe. There are also incel communities for people outside the Anglosphere, such as the Italian website Il Forum dei Brutti and the モテない男性 (motenai dansei ) board on the Japanese website 5channel. The English-language forums also receive much traffic from non-Anglophone countries. In 2020, research by the Swedish Defence Research Agency (FOI) on the three largest incel forums found that they had a total of about 20,000 users, with only about 1,000 who post actively. The FOI found that between 4.6 and 7.3% of the visitors to the forums originated from Sweden, though they caution this may not be accurate given the use of personal VPNs. It has been found in a paper by Robert C. Brooks et al. that areas with higher male-to-female sex ratios, fewer single women, higher income inequality, and lower gender pay gaps had higher rates of incel-related activity in tweets. However, research examined in a paper by Miriam Lindner has shown that in terms of violence acts that:

For the longest time, there was this misunderstanding that this type of violence could be ascribed to socio-economic standing or educational background, but when we look at the people who commit these very violent acts, it turns out that what they have in common is not that they are male–though 98% of them are male–it is actually that they are extremely misogynistic.

=== Female incels (femcels) ===
The first incel website, Alana's Involuntary Celibacy Project, was inclusive of all genders. There have been more contemporary female-specific incel or femcel communities, such as r/TruFemcels and its successor ThePinkPill. As of February 2020, the most popular female incel forum was the r/TruFemcels subreddit, with over 22,000 members. It was banned in January 2021 for violating Reddit's rules against promoting hate. Another subreddit reportedly associated with self-identified female incels is r/Vindicta, which contains beauty advice. There are reported to be tens of thousands of women self-identifying as female incels on the internet.

There is disagreement in online incel communities on whether women can be incels, with some claiming that male incels grossly outnumber female incels, others claiming that it is impossible for women to be incels at all, others claiming that only "severely deformed" women can be incels, and others arguing that only unattractive women belonging to the "bottom percentile in terms of appearance" can be incels. Members of male incel communities often reject the concept of a female incel, believing that all women can obtain sex from men, and believing that self-identified female incels who are truthful about their celibacy are actually voluntarily celibate. Members of male incel communities may also troll female incels.

The Anti-Defamation League reported in 2020 that the majority of incels do not believe that women can be incels. Journalists have written that outside of the female incels' own communities, few believe women can be incels. In 2021, M. Kelly wrote for Political Research Associates that members of incel communities point to the existence of female incels as an argument against criticisms of them as misogynist, but that most incel communities do not accept them and ban them from using their forums.

Like members of male incel communities, female incel community members tend to believe that they are victims to their ugliness and think that only unattractive men will date them. They call more attractive looking women "Stacys", who they believe decrease their chance of having sexual contact with men, similar to discussion of "Chads" in male incel forums. They have adopted the idea of the "pink pill", which has been likened to "red pill" and "black pill" terminology, and which describes a belief that some women are considered undesirable and thus are unable to engage in sexual relationships due to society's focus on certain aspects of female attractiveness.

Some women identifying as incels believe they could have casual sex, but fear it could only be with men who would abuse or disrespect them. Within online female incel communities, misogyny and an impossible feminine beauty ideal are also perceived as reasons for female celibacy. Other women may share similar concerns, but do not self-identify as female incels.

Some female incel communities have been critical of body positivity and mainstream feminism, viewing them as unhelpful to female incels. In 2022 a former member of the r/TruFemcels community was quoted in The Atlantic saying, "I'd rather be able to talk about being ugly than just try to convince myself that I'm pretty". In 2022, an expert in psychology interviewed by El País characterized female incel communities as overly insular and skeptical of outsiders (who are deemed "normies"), in what she described as "cognitive inflexibility". She stated that, "US culture is less sociable. In Spain, [female incels] would have completely different characteristics... I don't think it would have the same number of followers, to begin with, because in Spain we are more encouraging of interpersonal relationships, and the development of social skills."

Women who identify as incels share some similarities with their male counterparts, such as belief that physical appearance is the most important factor in finding a partner. In other ways they tend to be different. Members of female incel communities are more likely to self-blame rather than blaming men for their dating and sexual difficulties. This may be due to gender stereotypes, such as the belief that women do not have a "natural" need for sex. Journalist Isabelle Kohn wrote in 2020 that, rather than being angry at the men who reject them, they empathize with the men for not wanting to date them. Kohn notes the tendency for women identifying as incels to turn their rage inwards, rather than outwards like males.

Female incel communities are generally overlooked within academic literature about incels. In 2020, journalist Arwa Mahdawi hypothesized that the fact that females who identify as incels do not go on violent rampages like some of their male counterparts is the most obvious reason why they have not received much attention in mainstream media. In February 2020, Kohn wrote that she could find "mountains" of academic papers on male incels, but none on female incels. She says the assumption that female incels do not exist adds to their pain. In 2024, an article in Archives of Sexual Behavior stated that "there has been almost no research on femcel communities or what the women who join them have to say."

=== Gay incels (gaycels) ===
While the majority of self-proclaimed incels are heterosexual males, some gay men also refer to themselves as incels, or gaycels for short. Incel forums typically ban users who are discovered to be part of the LGBTQ community, meaning that gay incels do not have access to the more mainstream incel forums such as incels.is. Gaycels are typically repudiated and treated with hostility by straight incels in part because they are often seen as celibate due to excessively high standards.

== Mental health ==
"Involuntary celibacy" is not a medical or psychological condition. However, some people who identify as incel have physical disabilities, psychological or neurodevelopmental disorders. Incels cope with interpersonal rejection by engaging in both inward and outward practices, reporting higher levels of self-critical rumination and externalization of blame, while also engaging in fewer healthy coping mechanisms. Incels also report high rates of depressive and anxious symptoms and diagnoses as well as high rates of autism spectrum disorder. Incels also experience low attachment security, loneliness, and a lack of social supports. A 2024 study found that incels had significantly higher rates of anxious attachment and avoidant attachment styles than non-incel men. There is also evidence of sexist attitudes in incel forums, which incels admit may be making them more misogynistic. In a 2022 survey, roughly half of incels reported engaging in some form of psychotherapy, with twice as many reporting that it made them feel worse (15%) than better (6%). The same survey found that self-identified incels reported higher rates of depression, anxiety, and formal mental diagnoses than the general population: 95% reported depression and 93% reported anxiety. 38% had clinical diagnoses.

Some posters to incel forums attribute their inability to find a partner to physical or mental ailments, while some others attribute it to extreme introversion. Many of those identifying as incels engage in self-diagnosis of mental health issues. Members of incel communities often discourage posters who post about mental illness from seeing therapists or otherwise seeking treatment. Some members of incel communities with severe depression are also suicidal. Some members encourage suicidal members to kill themselves, sometimes recommending that they commit acts of mass violence before doing so. Some report sexual guilt and shame due to involuntary celibacy.

== Mass murderers and other violent incidents ==
Incels have been responsible for a number of high-profile attacks that have resulted in the deaths of over fifty individuals as of 2022. Within incel forums, there is an ambivalent attitude toward such acts of societal violence. Other intended attacks by incels or suspected incels have been thwarted by police before being carried out.

=== 2000s ===
On August 4, 2009, 48-year-old George Sodini entered a women's aerobics class at a health club in Collier Township, Pennsylvania, a suburb of Pittsburgh. Using at least two handguns, he shot seven women before shooting himself. Three women died and nine other people were injured before Sodini committed suicide. He reportedly felt justified in killing due to perceived lifelong disrespect by women. On his blog, Sodini chronicled his feelings of loneliness and frustration as well as his plans to carry out the shooting. He frequently used objectifying language, such as calling women "hoez", and was a follower of an online "dating guru" who claimed to help older men date younger women. Sodini's crime has been celebrated in the manosphere and on men's rights websites, where "going Sodini" became a catchphrase for a killing spree against women.

=== 2010s ===
On May 23, 2014, 22-year-old Elliot Rodger carried out a misogynist terrorist attack that killed six people and injured fourteen others, after which Rodger killed himself, near the campus of the University of California, Santa Barbara, in Isla Vista, California. These killings drew significant media attention to the incel community for the first time, particularly the misogyny and glorification of violence that are a mainstay of many incel forums. Rodger self-identified as an incel and left behind a 141-page manifesto and a six-minute YouTube video in which he discussed wanting revenge for being rejected by women. He had been an active member of an online forum popular among incels called PUAHate (short for "pickup artist hate"), where men gathered to express frustration with women as well as with their failure to achieve romantic success using the techniques of pickup artists. Rodger posted frequent tirades against feminism, including urging readers to "start envisioning a world where women fear [you]", and referenced the site several times in his manifesto. Facing public scrutiny, PUAHate shut down the day after the shooting. Users then migrated to a new forum, SlutHate, which was launched on May 26. Rodger became revered as a hero and martyr to incels, who began referring to Rodger as "Saint Elliott" and the "Supreme Gentleman", a term Rodger had used for himself. On incel forums, "E.R." is commonly used as a shorthand for Rodger, and "go[ing] ER" means to go on a killing spree like Rodger's. Rodger has been cited as an inspiration by the perpetrators or suspected perpetrators of several other violent crimes, and is one of several attackers who are regularly praised by members of incel communities.

On October 1, 2015, Chris Harper-Mercer killed nine people and injured eight others before killing himself in a shooting at the Umpqua Community College campus, in Roseburg, Oregon. He left a manifesto at the scene, outlining his interest in other mass murders including the Isla Vista killings, his anger at not having a girlfriend, and his animus towards the world. In his journal writings, he had related to Elliot Rodger and other mass shooters, describing them as "people who stand with the gods". Before the attack, when someone on an online message board had speculated Harper-Mercer was "saving himself for someone special", Harper-Mercer had replied: 'involuntarily so". Several hours before the shooting, someone suspected to be Harper-Mercer posted a threat to a Pacific Northwest college to /r9k/, a 4chan board with many incel posters.

On July 31, 2016, Sheldon Bentley robbed and killed an unconscious man in an alleyway in Edmonton, Alberta. During his trial, Bentley said he killed the man by stomping on his abdomen because he was frustrated with stress from his job as a security guard and with being an incel for four years.

On December 7, 2017, William Atchison killed two people before killing himself, in Aztec, New Mexico, in a shooting at Aztec High School, where he had previously been a student. He had used the pseudonym "Elliot Rodger" on several online forums and praised the "supreme gentleman" (a term Rodger had used to describe himself, which has since become a common reference among incel communities). Atchison had also posted far-right content online.

On February 14, 2018, Nikolas Cruz killed seventeen people and injured seventeen others, in a shooting at Stoneman Douglas High School in Parkland, Florida. Allegedly also motivated by other extremist views, Cruz had allegedly previously posted online that "Elliot Rodger will not be forgotten".

After committing a 2018 vehicle-ramming attack in Toronto, Ontario that appeared to target female pedestrians, perpetrator Alek Minassian cited Rodger as an inspiration. Minassian was convicted of 10 counts of first-degree murder and 16 counts of attempted murder. Shortly before the attack, Minassian had allegedly posted on Facebook that "the Incel Rebellion has already begun" and applauded Rodger. The term "Incel Rebellion" is sometimes used interchangeably with the term "Beta Uprising", which refers to a violent response to incels' perceived sexual deprivation. Following the attack, a poster on a website created to supersede r/incels wrote about Minassian, "I hope this guy wrote a manifesto because he could be our next new saint". Following the attack, police claimed that Minassian had been radicalized by incel communities. A video interview was released in September 2019 showing Minassian being interrogated by police shortly after the attacks. In the video, Minassian is shown telling police that he was a virgin, and that he was motivated by a resentment of "Chads and Stacys", as well as women who gave "their love and affection to obnoxious brutes" rather than to him. The video also showed Minassian saying that he hoped the alleged attack would "inspire future masses to join me" in committing acts of violence as a part of the "Beta Uprising". The judge who found Minassian guilty on all counts wrote in her decision that Minassian had attempted to tie his attack to the incel community as a way of increasing his notoriety, and that "working out his exact motivation for this attack is ... close to impossible". She found that Minassian had "lie[d] to the police about much of the incel motivation he talked about and that the incel movement was not in fact a primary driving force behind the attack".

On November 2, 2018, Scott Beierle killed two women and injured four women and a man before killing himself in a shooting at the Hot Yoga Tallahassee studio in Tallahassee, Florida. He had been a follower of incel ideologies for a long time, and had a history of arrests for grabbing women's buttocks. In 2014, he posted several YouTube videos of himself espousing extreme hatred for women and expressing anger over not having a girlfriend, mentioning Elliot Rodger in one video. In the months leading up to the shooting, he posted numerous misogynistic, racist, violent, and homophobic songs to SoundCloud.

In January 2019, Christopher Cleary was arrested for posting on Facebook that he was "planning on shooting up a public place soon and being the next mass shooter" and "killing as many girls as I see" because he had never had a girlfriend and was a virgin. He has been described as an incel in the media. In May 2019, Cleary was sentenced to up to five years in prison for an attempted threat of terrorism.

On June 17, 2019, Brian Isaack Clyde began what was intended to be a mass shooting at the Earle Cabell Federal Building and Courthouse in Dallas, Texas. He was shot and fatally wounded by officers from the Federal Protective Service before he injured anyone. Clyde had shared incel memes on social media, along with other posts referencing right-wing beliefs and conspiracy theories. Following the incident, the Joint Base Andrews military base briefed its personnel on certain online behaviors among "introverted, sexless individuals", with a spokesman describing them as "a very real threat to military members and civilians".

Self-identified incels have praised attackers with unclear motives, who they believe to be incels. After the 2017 Las Vegas shooting, some of the incel community celebrated the shooter Stephen Paddock, who they felt was a hero who was targeting "normies". After the 2018 Toronto shooting, posters on an incel message board expressed excitement with the possibility that the perpetrator might be an incel, although no motive was identified.

=== 2020s ===
Coty Scott Taylor abducted 6-year-old Faye Marie Swetlik on February 10, 2020, in Cayce, South Carolina. Three days later, both Taylor and Swetlik were found dead. It was determined that Taylor had suffocated Swetlik and then killed himself by cutting his throat. Friends reported that Taylor was a self-described incel and that he had often said he "lived without hope".

On February 24, 2020, a female spa worker was stabbed to death in an attack that also severely injured her female coworker at an erotic massage parlor in Toronto. On May 19, the Toronto Police Service declared the attack was being treated as a terrorist incident after evidence pointed to the stabbings being motivated by incel ideology, and police laid charges against a 17-year-old male alleged to have committed the stabbings. This was the first time violence thought to be motivated by incel ideologies was prosecuted as an act of terrorism, and is also believed to be the first act of violence not perpetrated by an Islamist extremist to be prosecuted as terrorism in Canada. On September 14, 2022, the perpetrator entered a guilty plea to murder and attempted murder. The attack was ruled a terrorist attack during sentencing proceedings.

Armando Hernandez Jr. opened fire on May 20, 2020, at Westgate Entertainment District, a mixed-use development in Glendale, Arizona, before being arrested by police. A 19-year-old man was critically injured, while a 30-year-old woman and a 16-year-old girl suffered minor injuries. According to the Maricopa County prosecutor, Hernandez identified himself as an incel and claimed he wanted to target couples and shoot at least ten people. The prosecutor said, "Mr. Hernandez is a self-professed incel ... He was taking out his anger at society, the feeling that he has been bullied, the feeling that women didn't want him". The prosecutor also alleged that Hernandez sent a video of the attack to a woman he wished to impress.

Between January and the end of July 2020, five self-identified incels were arrested in separate incidents in North America for killing or planning to kill women. Among them was Cole Carini, a man who was charged with making false statements to law enforcement in June 2020 after claiming serious injuries to his hands had been caused by a lawnmower accident. Police alleged that Carini was actually injured while trying to make a bomb, and that he had written a note threatening violence against women and referencing Elliot Rodger.

In April 2021, Malik Sanchez, a 19-year-old self-described incel who praised Elliot Rodger, was arrested on federal charges after allegedly videotaping himself approaching women sitting outside a restaurant in Manhattan, New York and telling them he was going to detonate a bomb. The man had previously been arrested several times for harassing others, often while recording or livestreaming, and for multiple assaults with pepper spray.

In July 2021, a 21-year-old self-identified incel from Ohio was charged with attempting a hate crime and illegally possessing a machine gun. The man was a frequent poster on a popular incel website, where he wrote posts venerating Elliot Rodger. He wrote a manifesto in which he expressed his desire to "slaughter" women, and in another document he allegedly wrote about his goals to kill 3,000 people in a mass casualty attack.

On August 12, 2021, Jake Davison, a 22-year-old man who referenced "inceldom" in online videos and expressed similar views, perpetrated a mass shooting in Plymouth, England. He killed five people, including his mother, and injured two others before killing himself.

On March 21, 2022, a stabbing took place at Malmö Latin School in Malmö, Sweden, during which 18-year-old Fabian Cederholm stabbed and killed two female teachers with an axe and a knife before disarming himself, calling emergency services and being arrested by first responders. Cederholm had previously praised Elliot Rodger online.

On May 6, 2023, 33-year-old self-identified incel Mauricio Martinez Garcia went on a spree shooting in a mall in Allen, Texas. Garcia killed eight people and injured at least seven others before he was killed by a police officer.

On October 4, 2024, 19-year-old Semih Çelik killed Ayşenur Halil and İkbal Uzuner (both women aged 19) during which he threw Uzuner's severed head off the Walls of Constantinople before committing suicide himself. Çelik was in contact with incel groups on Discord, where he received praise for his actions. Turkish police began monitoring incel groups in response. Following a decision by an Ankara court, Turkey blocked Discord in the aftermath of the murders.

On April 17, 2025, two people were killed and six others injured, including suspect Phoenix Ikner, in a shooting at Florida State University. Ikner reportedly referred to himself as an incel in conversations with ChatGPT.

On April 26, 2025, 38-year-old Owen Lawrence, armed with a crossbow, attacked two women participating in the Otley Run, a popular Pub crawl in Leeds, West Yorkshire, with the 19-year-old having to undergo surgery for life-threatening injuries. Lawrence then fired an airgun into his head, leading to his death two days later. Prior to the attack, he had explicitly stated via Facebook that the motive for the attack was misogyny, and had referenced incel ideology and other mass murders (some of whom were incels) in the past.

On April 15, 2026, 14-year-old İsa Aras Mersinli shot and killed 10 people and wounded 13 at his school in Onikişubat, Turkey before being stabbed to death by two students' father. His WhatsApp account's profile picture was a picture of Elliot Rodger.

On June 22, 2026, 25-year-old Seth Hatfield fired shots outside the headquarters of Aylo, a multinational conglomerate involved in internet pornography, including the pornographic video-sharing website Pornhub, in the Côte-des-Neiges neighborhood of Montreal, Quebec, Canada. Hatfield, a responding police officer, and a civilian were killed during the subsequent shootout. Hatfield was believed to have written a 104-page manifesto using incel-related rhetoric, in which the author decried feminism, liberalism, and capitalism and suggested targeting the headquarters of pornography companies and other institutions.

== Criticism ==
=== Of the subculture ===
Incel communities have been criticized in the media and by researchers as violent, misogynist, and extremist. Keegan Hankes, a senior research analyst working for the Southern Poverty Law Center, has cautioned that exposure to violent content on incel forums "play[s] a very large role" in the radicalization of their members, and describes incel forums as having "more violent rhetoric than I'm used to seeing on even white supremacist sites". Journalist David Futrelle has described incel communities as "violently misogynistic", and is among critics who attribute worsening violent rhetoric on incel forums to the growth of the alt-right and white supremacy, and the overlap between incel communities and online hate groups.

Psychologist and sex researcher James Cantor has described incels as "a group of people who usually lack sufficient social skills and ... find themselves very frustrated". He has said that in incel forums "when they're surrounded by other people with similar frustrations, they kind of lose track of what typical discourse is, and they drive themselves into more and more extreme beliefs". Senior research fellow at the Institute for Strategic Dialogue (ISD), Amarnath Amarasingam, has criticized some incel communities where calls for violence are commonplace, saying "under the right set of psychological and personal circumstances, these kinds of forums can be dangerous and push people into violence".

In August 2018, another researcher at the ISD, Jacob Davey, compared the radicalization of men in incel forums to teenagers being urged to go to extreme measures on online forums that promote anorexia and other eating disorders, and to online campaigns convincing people to join ISIL. Speaking about their feelings of entitlement to sex, Davey said the attitude "can go as far as the justification of rape".

While generally agreeing with critics' concerns about misogyny and other negative characteristics in the incel subculture, some commentators have been more sympathetic. In April 2018, economist Robin Hanson wrote a blog post likening access to sex with access to income, writing that he found it puzzling that similar concern had not been shown to incels as to low-income individuals. Hanson was criticized by some for discussing sex as if it was a commodity; others wrote more positively about his opinions.

In May 2018, the New York Times columnist Ross Douthat wrote a similarly controversial op-ed, titled "The Redistribution of Sex" in which he suggested sex robots and sex workers would inevitably be called upon to satisfy incels' sexual desires. Columnist Toby Young argues that sex robots could be a "workable solution"; others have criticized the column for objectifying women and for legitimizing the incel ideology.

Journalist Zack Beauchamp has expressed concern about other types of harm inflicted by incels that may be lost in the attention paid specifically to mass violence; he points to forum posts in which users brag about yelling at, catfishing, and sexually assaulting women. University of Portsmouth lecturer Lisa Sugiura has described incel forums as a "networked misogyny", and urged the posts in such forums be taken seriously not only in the context of hate speech but also as a form of grooming that could radicalize "impressionable and vulnerable disillusioned young men". Some sociological research on incel communities has analyzed them as a hybrid masculinity, in which privileged men distance themselves from hegemonic masculinity while simultaneously reproducing it.

=== Of platforms providing services to incel communities ===
Criticism has also been directed against platforms that host or have hosted incel content, including Reddit (which banned the r/incels community in 2017, and banned most of the remaining incel communities in September 2019, but is still home to some identifying as incels) and Twitter. Cloudflare, which provides services including DDoS protection, caching and obsfucation of the source host of the content, has also been criticized for protecting incel websites against downtime even when webhosts have terminated service.

=== Of reporting and research ===
Reporting on incels by media outlets following the incel-related attacks during the 2010s has been criticized for its "breathless" coverage, for normalizing incel communities by describing them only as "sexually frustrated", and for directing readers to incel communities. Some reporting has also been criticized for giving attackers notoriety by reporting on them at length, or for victim blaming by implying that women who had rejected the attackers' romantic or sexual advances held some responsibility for provoking the attacks. Those who have written sympathetically about incels have faced criticism for legitimizing the incel ideology, such as from Samantha Cole in Vice who condemned media outlets who "cove[r] and amplif[y] toxic internet culture as if it's valid ideology".

In a 2021 report published by Political Research Associates, M. Kelly wrote about recent attempts by various self-identified incels to "rebrand" their communities and stated that "incels' attempts to reframe their identity have also been helped along by researchers, journalists, and 'counter-violent extremism' experts, who, in their attempts to investigate and understand incels, have given them larger, more mainstream platforms. These new platforms have allowed self-identified incels to reframe the public narrative about them; minimize the threat their community poses; and have amplified—or even endorsed—their hate-laced grievances, centering their self-perceived victimhood at the hands of women who deny them sex".

Kelly criticized a podcast titled The Incel Project for platforming incel ideologies without challenging or fact-checking their statements. She said the creator, Naama Kates, was "no longer just reporting on incels' misogyny, but justifying and sharing it with the world". Kelly criticized the International Center for Study of Violent Extremism (ICSVE), who published several reports on incels co-authored by Kates and by the founder and lead moderator of a major incel forum, writing that "while previous ICSVE reports have drawn from primary data, including interviews and surveys with members of the community being studied, this seems to be the first time—at ICSVE or in academic research more broadly—that someone actively involved in a community that regularly expresses bigoted or violent ideology has co-authored the resulting study".

A 2024 report commissioned by the UK Commission for Countering Extremism concluded that incel participation is driven primarily by mental-health difficulties and social isolation rather than ideological extremism, and recommended that public responses focus on support services instead of counter-terrorism approaches.

== Portrayals in fiction ==
In his debut novel Whatever (1994), French writer Michel Houellebecq seems to portray early examples of incels. However, the term did not yet exist at the time; neither did the online communities. The unnamed, 30-year-old protagonist looks unattractive, lacks social skills and has depression, which means that despite his excellent job as an IT professional, he is not popular with women. Things are much worse for his colleague, who is downright ugly and a virgin at 28. The main character tries to seduce his friend into killing a young woman who has rejected him, which his friend refuses at the last moment. In this novel, the main protagonist philosophizes about the disastrous consequences of the sexual revolution. Because of sexual liberalism, the market mechanism has come to determine human relationships; as a consequence, beautiful people get everything, ugly people get nothing. A film adaptation was made in 1999, also titled Whatever.

Two episodes of the American crime drama Law & Order: Special Victims Unit are based on incels. In season 16, the episode "Holden's Manifesto" (2014) is based on Elliot Rodger and the 2014 Isla Vista killings. In season 20, the episode "Revenge" (2018) features a group of incels who attack the targets of each other's obsession to exact revenge while creating alibis for one another, the plotline which in itself is inspired by a 1950s novel, Strangers on a Train. An episode of the American medical series Chicago Med also focused on an incel patient who is injured in a drive-by shooting targeting hospital staff.

Fair Warning, a 2020 thriller novel by Michael Connelly, features a company that buys genetic test data on women genetically identified as vulnerable to sex addiction. The company sells their names and addresses to incels, one of whom is a serial killer.

The 2023 science fiction film The Beast also features a character based on Elliot Rodger.

The British miniseries Adolescence, released on Netflix in 2025, directly explores incel culture. Told across four episodes, the series follows Jamie Miller, a 13-year-old boy arrested for the murder of his classmate, Katie. Through police interrogations and psychological evaluations, it is revealed that Jamie had been influenced by online ideologies associated with the manosphere and incel communities. The series examines the impact of social media, toxic masculinity, and adolescent radicalization.

The first story in the 2024 underground film Castration Movie Anthology i: Traps chronicles an egg as they are radicalized into becoming an incel.

== See also ==
- 4B movement – Radical feminist movement
- Genetics of personal development
- Herbivore men – Japanese term for men with little interest in getting married or finding a girlfriend
- Hikikomori – Reclusive adolescents or adults
- Human mating strategies – Desirable qualities in partners
- Hypergamy – Practice of a person marrying a spouse of higher social status
- Incelcore – Internet music microgenre
- Mate value – Sum of desirable traits in a potential mate
- Neckbeard – Pejorative term and stereotype for men
- Nice guy – Term in popular psychology
- Operational sex ratio – Quantitative ratio of sexually active population
- Sex differences in psychology – Differences in the mental functions and behaviors of the sexes
- Sex segregation – Physical, legal, and cultural separation of people according to their gender or sex
- Sexual abstinence – Act of refraining from sexual activity
- Sexual capital – Social value from sexual attractiveness
- Sheng nu – Derogatory term in China for unmarried women in their late twenties
- Simp – Slang for sycophancy
- Singles Awareness Day – Celebration of single people
- Social determinism – Theory of human behavior
- Spinster – Unmarried woman, often older
