= Isla Vista attacks copycat crimes =

Incel-motivated criminal acts

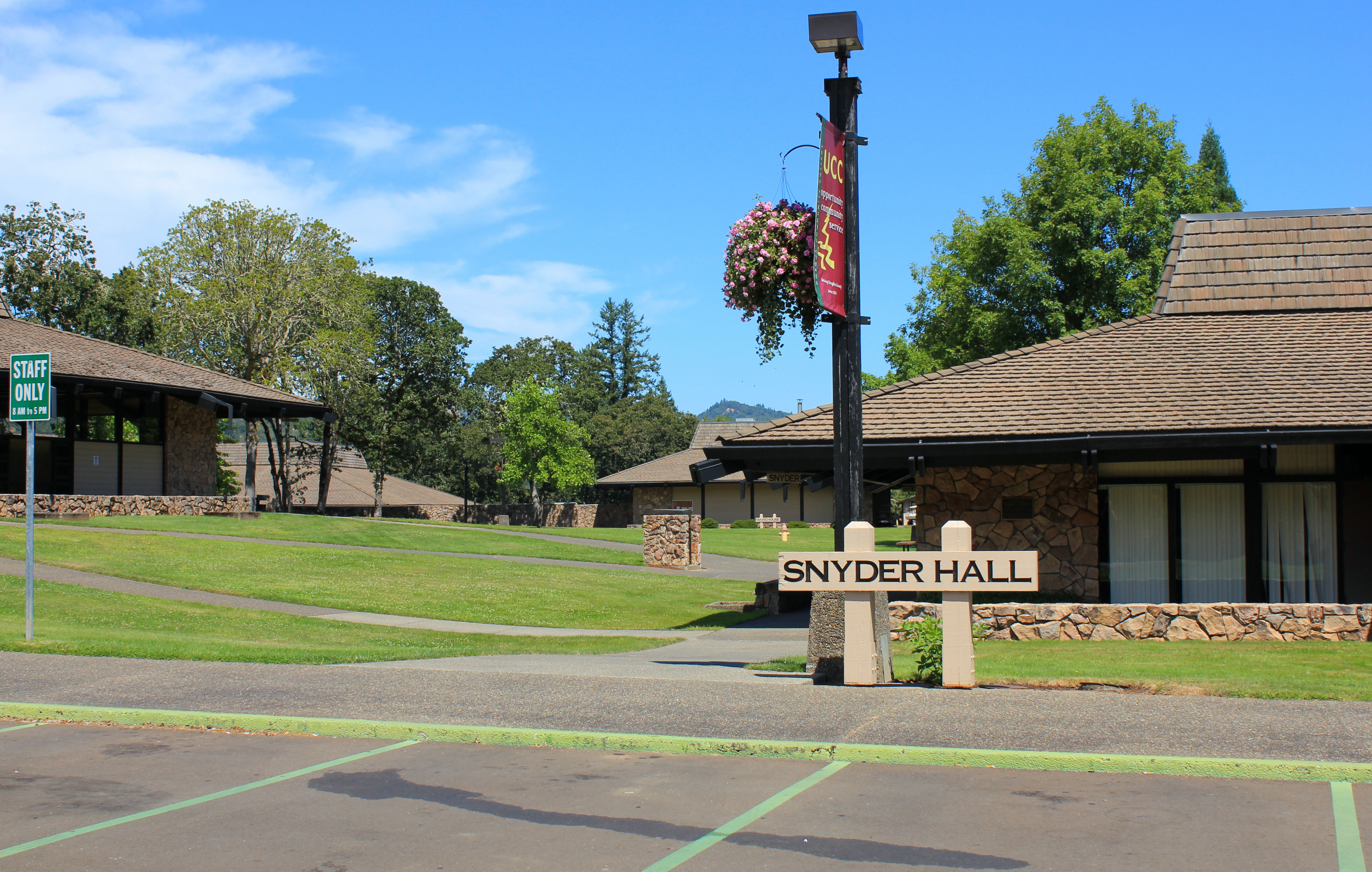
Snyder Hall, the scene of the Umpqua Community College shooting in Roseburg, Oregon, United States

The Isla Vista attacks, perpetrated by Elliot Rodger in Isla Vista, California, United States in 2014, was the first incel-motivated terrorist attack in history and have since inspired similar acts of violence.

In the years since, the Anti-Defamation League (ADL) has documented dozens of incidents involving Rodger-inspired incel and misogynist violence and plots, which have collectively resulted in more than 100 deaths and injuries worldwide. Notable attacks inspired by Rodger include the 2015 Umpqua Community College shooting, the 2018 Parkland high school shooting, 2018 Toronto van attack, and the 2023 Allen, Texas, mall shooting.

== Background ==
=== Incels ===
An incel (/ˈɪnsɛl/ IN-sel; an abbreviation of "involuntary celibate" or "involuntarily celibate"), is a member of an online subculture of mostly heterosexual men who define themselves as unable to find a romantic or sexual partner despite desiring one. The incel subculture came to wider public attention in the 2010s with the banning of controversial subreddit r/incels and a series of mass murders committed by men who either identified as incels or held similar ideologies, including Elliot Rodger and Alek Minassian.

The incel subculture's online discourse is characterized by social rejection, social isolation, resentment, hostile sexism, anti-feminism, sexual objectification and dehumanization of women, misogyny, homophobia, misanthropy, self-pity and self-loathing, racism, a sense of entitlement to sex, nihilism, rape culture, and the endorsement of sexual and non-sexual violence against women and the sexually active. Incels tend to blame both women and the feminist movement for their inability to find a partner. They often attribute their romantic failures to biological determinism and women's perceived hypergamy, where women are said to have an innate and unchangeable preference for mating with only the most physically attractive males (nicknamed "Chads"). Classified as part of the manosphere, an online association of anti-feminist and male supremacist groups that includes incels along with men's rights activists (MRAs), men going their own way (MGTOW) and pick-up artists (PUAs), most incels identify with the "black pill", a more nihilistic version of the manosphere's belief in the "red pill" that argues men are an oppressed group in a society dominated by feminism. The "black pill" refers to the fatalistic belief that society is dominated by women and physically attractive men or "alpha males". Incels believe it is impossible for unattractive men to escape this social hierarchy.

=== Isla Vista attacks ===
On the evening of May 23, 2014, multiple misogynistic terrorist attacks occurred in Isla Vista, California, United States. Elliot Rodger murdered six people and injured 14 others by gunshot, stabbing, and vehicle ramming near the campus of the University of California, Santa Barbara (UCSB), before fatally shooting himself after a being wounded in a shootout with the police. Sheriff Bill Brown said that Rodger's actions were due to shortcomings in the mental-health treatment system, noted a widespread shortfall in resources for community mental health care, and criticized inadequate communication from healthcare professionals regarding people who suffer from suicidal or homicidal thoughts.

== Copycat crimes ==
In the wake of the attacks, several news outlets suppressed the "Retribution" video uploaded by Rodger out of fear for triggering copycat crimes. In 2020, the BBC described Rodger as "the founding father of the incel ideology". Some members of the incel community have celebrated Rodger's attacks with tribute songs, merchandise featuring his image, and created memes depicting him in a religious manner. Some users refer to him as a "saint" and mark the anniversary of the killings as "Saint Elliot Day". Within incel forums, his name was often abbreviated as "ER" and his attacks have been cited as an inspiration by individuals involved in or suspected of other acts of mass violence, sometimes described as "going ER".

=== List of successful copycat crimes ===
Name	Date	Deaths	Injuries	Perpetrator	Notes
2015 Umpqua Community College shooting	October 1, 2015	10 (including the perpetrator)	8	Chris Harper-Mercer	On October 1, 2015, 26-year-old Chris Harper-Mercer, killed nine people and injured eight others in a shooting at Umpqua Community College before killing himself. Prior to the attack, Harper-Mercer referenced Rodger alongside other mass killers in a manifesto, describing them as "people who are elite, people who stand with the gods".
2017 Aztec High School shooting	December 7, 2017	3 (including the perpetrator)	0	William Atchison	On December 7, 2017, 21-year-old William Atchison, killed two people before killing himself in a shooting at Aztec High School, which he formerly attended, in Aztec, New Mexico. The shooting was described by some as an instance of incel violence. Atchison had used the name "Elliot Rodger" online and had praised him as the "supreme gentleman", though it was later described as "unclear" if Atchison identified as an incel.
Parkland high school shooting	February 14, 2018	17	17	Nikolas Cruz	On February 14, 2018, 19-year-old Nikolas Cruz, killed seventeen people and injured seventeen others, in a shooting at Marjory Stoneman Douglas High School in Parkland, Florida. Cruz had previously posted online that "Elliot Rodger will not be forgotten".
2018 Toronto van attack	April 23, 2018	11	15	Alek Minassian	On April 23, 2018, 25-year-old Alek Minassian, killed eleven people and injured fifteen others in a vehicle-ramming attack in North York City Centre, Toronto, Canada. Before the attack, Minassian posted a message on Facebook referencing an "Incel Rebellion" and praising Rodger.
2018 Toronto shooting	July 22, 2018	3 (including the perpetrator)	13	Faisal Hussain	On July 22, 2018, 29-year-old Faisal Hussain, killed 2 and injured 13 in a shooting in Greektown, Toronto, Canada before killing himself. Hussain's actions were believed to have been inspired by Rodger. Police later discovered copies of Rodger's manifesto on several of Hussain's devices.
2018 Tallahassee shooting	November 2, 2018	3 (including the perpetrator)	5	Scott Paul Beierle	On November 2, 2018, a mass shooting occurred at Tallahassee Hot Yoga, a yoga studio located in Tallahassee, Florida, United States. 40-year-old Scott Paul Beierle shot six women, two fatally, and pistol-whipped a man before killing himself. YouTube videos posted by Beierle in 2014 showed that he identified as an incel and also sympathized with the Rodger.
2020 Toronto machete attack	February 24, 2020	1	2 (including the perpetrator)	Oguzhan Sert	On February 24, 2020, 17-year-old Oguzhan Sert, entered a spa with a machete and killed one woman while seriously injuring another; the incident ended when the second injured victim disarmed the perpetrator and stabbed him in the back, critically injuring him. The perpetrator named Rodger as inspiration for the stabbing.
2023 Allen, Texas, mall shooting	May 6, 2023	9 (including the perpetrator)	7	Mauricio Martinez Garcia	On May 6, 2023, 33-year-old Mauricio Martinez Garcia went on a spree shooting in a mall in Allen, Texas. Garcia killed eight people and injured at least seven others before he was killed by a police officer. He praised the perpetrator the of Isla Vista attacks and identified himself as an incel.
2026 Fagersta school stabbing	August 21, 2026	1	3	Liam Nebel	On 21 August 2026, an 18-year-old man armed with a sword attacked Brinellskolan in Fagersta, Västmanland County, Sweden. As police investigated, they found a 17-year-old girl dead and three others injured. According to the Global Network on Extremism and Technology, the attack was reportedly motivated by admiration for Rodger and other mass murderers.

=== List of unsuccessful copycat crimes ===
Date (of arrest)	Perpetrator	Notes
June 3, 2025	Unidentified 29-year-old	On June 3, 2025, Argentine Federal Police arrested a 29-year-old student for planning and preparing an attack against the Boulogne Sur Mer area using two katanas and shurikens. He was heavily inspired by the Isla Vista attack and, according to his messages, claimed he was going to be the first Argentine and Spanish-speaking incel in history.
May 21, 2024	Alexandre G.	On May 21, 2024, French authorities arrested Alexandre G., a French national, over suspicions that he was preparing a violent attack connected to the Olympic torch relay ceremony scheduled in Bordeaux, France. Prosecutors said that he made concerning remarks about the upcoming tenth anniversary of the Isla Vista attacks of May 23, 2014. Investigators subsequently identified his connections to online incel communities. During his detention, Alexandre allegedly told investigators that he had contemplated carrying out an attack.
October 22, 2023	Michael Pengchung Lee	On October 22, 2023, Michael Pengchung Lee was arrested in Arizona. Lee, who described himself as a "former incel", pled guilty on April 12th, 2024, for threatening to commit a Rodger-inspired mass shooting on the University of Arizona campus.

== See also ==
- Columbine High School massacre copycat crimes
- Christchurch mosque shootings copycat crimes
