= 2026 Montreal shooting =

Shooting in Quebec, Canada

- Location: 45.493532°N 73.649050°W; Côte-des-Neiges, Montreal, Quebec, Canada
- Date: June 22, 2026
- Target: Aylo headquarters
- Attack type: Ambush; shootout
- Weapon: SKS semi-automatic rifle
- Deaths: 3 (including the perpetrator)
- Injuries: 2
- Perpetrator: Seth Hatfield
- Defender: Service de police de la Ville de Montréal
- Motive: Opposition to pornography; Anti-capitalism; Incel ideology

On June 22, 2026, a shooting and a subsequent shootout occurred outside the headquarters of Aylo, a multinational conglomerate involved in internet pornography, including the pornographic video-sharing website Pornhub, in the Côte-des-Neiges neighborhood of Montreal, Quebec, Canada.

Three people were killed during the incident: a civilian; a Montreal City Police Service (SPVM) police officer; and the perpetrator, 25-year-old Seth Hatfield, who was fatally shot by responding officers. A second SPVM officer was critically injured, and a second civilian sustained minor injuries. Quebec's minister of public security Ian Lafrenière denied terrorism as a motivation.

== Shooting ==
On June 22, 2026, at 11:35 a.m. EDT, the Montreal City Police Service (SPVM) responded to a 911 call after a witness saw a gun sticking out of a window at the Hilton Garden Inn Montreal Midtown, and reported hearing gunshots. The gunman appeared to be shooting at the sixth floor of the building across from the hotel, where Aylo's employees were working. When police officers arrived, they exchanged gunfire with the gunman, now at street level. One officer, a civilian, and the perpetrator were killed. A second officer was critically injured.

Constable Mohamed Lamine Benredouane and a female police officer were the first to arrive. Benredouane was shot and fatally wounded. A civilian, Michel Mizrahi, was also fatally shot as he approached the police officers' position. The female police officer was then shot and critically wounded. The gunman was fatally shot by Constable Xavier Gaumond as he reloaded. Gaumond, who was working as the acting sergeant of Station 26, had arrived in time to see Benredouane being shot.

Police blocked Highway 15 and the Orange Line and ordered residents within the boundaries of Côte-des-Neiges Road, MacDonald Street, Highway 40 and Queen Mary to remain indoors. A video posted to social media showed the shooter dressed in camouflage and ambushing the officers. A witness estimated hearing 30–40 gunshots.

Police Chief Fady Dagher stated that he did not know who shot Mizrahi.

== Victims ==
The shooter killed an SPVM police officer and injured another police officer. A civilian was also fatally shot during the incident; the circumstances of his death remain under investigation.

The Israeli Consulate in Montreal identified the civilian victim as Israeli Michel Mizrahi, aged 68, a Montreal resident of more than 30 years. A second civilian received minor injuries.

The slain officer was Constable Mohamed Lamine Benredouane, aged 34, who joined the SPVM in 2021. This incident marked the first SPVM officer killed in the line of duty in 24 years. According to Borough Mayor Stéphanie Valenzuela, Constable Benredouane grew up in the neighbourhood where he died. A second officer was critically injured.

== Perpetrator ==
Unndated photo of Seth Hatfield

The Quebec coroner's office identified the perpetrator as Seth Scott Hatfield, aged 25, a resident of Lethbridge, Alberta. He attended Catholic Central High School in Lethbridge before graduating in 2019, and majored in philosophy at the University of Lethbridge. Hatfield appeared in the school's online dean's honour roll for philosophy. A high-risk operation was carried out at his residence on the day of the incident.

A 2023 archive of Hatfield's YouTube account featured a playlist of videos called "Favorites" which included videos from conspiracy theorist Paul Joseph Watson, a military march "Farewell of Slavianka" that was used during the Russian Civil War, and a question and answer video about fascism. The videos were published between 2019 and 2021. Hatfield's subscriptions focused on pagan beliefs, fishing, and firearms.

=== Manifesto ===
"Be unflinching, go forth, and KILL THEM ALL!"

— Seth Hatfield, last words of the 104-page manifesto

Hatfield was linked to incel subculture after a 104-page manifesto was found in a hotel room. He wrote that online pornography, including Pornhub, was responsible for a large part of men's suffering. In his manifesto, he called for the targeting of pornography industry conventions, the headquarters of global pornography companies, as well as prominent pornographic film actors and actresses. Pickup artists and plastic surgeons were also among groups targeted in his manifesto. The manifesto also called for the destruction of liberalism and capitalism by armed revolution, and according to the Institute for Strategic Dialogue, combined Marxist ideology with incel beliefs. Hatfield wrote that modern capitalism was responsible for the "hypergamy state" of women. He identified business leaders, politicians, Zionists, and cryptocurrency leaders as "class A targets".

== Reactions ==
Canadian prime minister Mark Carney issued a statement expressing his condolences to the victims of the shooting and expressed gratitude towards the police for protecting the community. At a press conference, Quebec premier Christine Frechette expressed her condolences to the families of the victims and asked for the Quebec flag to be flown at half-mast.

Montreal mayor Soraya Martinez Ferrada expressed her condolences to the family of the slain police officer and ordered the city to fly its flags at half-mast. Ferrada further expressed concerns surrounding online discourse and gun violence. At a joint press conference with Ferrada, Stéphanie Valenzuela, borough mayor of Côte-des-Neiges–Notre-Dame-de-Grâce, expressed her and the borough council's condolences to the family of Constable Benredouane and to all the victims of the shooting.

Aylo issued a statement to the media expressing their condolences to the families of the victims and gratitude to first responders for protecting their employees. Employees of the company were present during the shooting.

It was initially speculated that the attack could have been motivated by antisemitism because it occurred in a large Jewish community. On the evening of the incident, the Jewish Community Council of Montreal urged the public not to leap to conclusions. In a statement, they warned that speculation or rumours would undermine their fight against antisemitism and "make it harder to persuade others when genuine antisemitic incidents occur".

Saint-Jean-Baptiste Day celebrations in Côte-des-Neiges were cancelled out of respect for the community. Municipal government facilities in the borough were also closed. The CN Tower dimmed its lights to commemorate the slain officer.

On June 24, around 1,000 mourners gathered at the Islamic Centre of Quebec in Saint-Laurent for Benredouane's funeral. A public funeral was planned for July 7. On June 26, Benredouane's sister pleaded on Facebook for people to stop sharing videos of her brother's death out of respect for him and his family, writing that she did not want Benredouane's children to come across the video.

A women-led protest organized by Pour Elles Montreal against incel subculture was held on June 25. It began at the memorial for the École Polytechnique massacre, a mass shooting committed by a misogynistic terrorist. According to one organizer for the protest, the purpose of the demonstration was to trigger a discussion about misogyny, violence against women, and the radicalization of young men online.

On July 1, a gathering near the location of the shooting took place to end Mizrahi's shiva. A large screen was set up to allow for those in attendance to see Mizrahi's family in Israel, but it was knocked over by the wind. A tribute was also given to Benredouane during the gathering.

On July 7, a public commemorative ceremony and procession was held at the Bell Centre in honour of Benredouane, with family members, dignitaries, and more than 5,000 police officers from across Canada in attendance. A march of police officers began at the headquarters of the SPVM and ended at the Bell Centre, with the march being flanked on the street by other police officers, first responders, and onlooking civilians.

== Investigation ==
The SQ launched a criminal investigation into the shooter. The Lethbridge Police Service cooperated with Quebec authorities on the investigation into the shooting. The Royal Canadian Mounted Police's Integrated National Security Enforcement Team opened an independent investigation into ideologically motivated violent extremism in response to the shooting. A separate coroner's investigation into the three deaths was also launched following the shooting.

The Bureau of Independent Investigations (BEI), a civilian agency which investigates serious injuries and fatalities involving police in Quebec, launched an investigation into the police response to the suspect, in collaboration with the Sûreté du Québec (SQ). On July 6, the BEI established a command post at the intersection of two roads in Montreal, De Courtrai Avenue and Décarie Boulevard, for four hours and requested that witnesses or owners of videos of the police response to the shooting visit them or go to their website.

== See also ==
- 2012 Montreal shooting – another notable shooting in Montreal, Canada
- 2018 Toronto van attack – a vehicle-ramming attack conducted by an incel in Toronto, Canada
- 2020 Toronto machete attack – misogynist terrorist attack in Toronto, Canada
- 2020 Westgate Entertainment District shooting – the attacker identified as an incel and a communist
