= Tallahassee shooting =

Tallahassee shooting may refer to:

- 2014 Florida State University shooting, which occurred in Tallahassee
- 2018 Tallahassee shooting, a misogyny-motivated mass shooting at a hot yoga studio
- Killing of Tony McDade, the fatal 2020 police shooting of a Black transgender man that occurred in Tallahassee
- 2025 Florida State University shooting, which occurred in Tallahassee
