= Compugen =

Compugen refers to at least two different companies:

- Compugen (Canadian company) – Canadian IT company
- Compugen (Israeli company) – publicly traded Israeli drug discovery company
