= Montreal shooting =

Montreal shooting may refer to:

- 2012 Montreal shooting
- 2026 Montreal shooting

== See also ==
- Montreal school shooting
