= 2018 Toronto shooting =

Mass shooting in Toronto, Canada

- Location of shooting in Toronto
- Location: 43°40′40″N 79°21′6″W; Greektown, Toronto, Ontario, Canada
- Date: July 22, 2018; 9:56 - 10:06 p.m. (UTC−04:00)
- Target: Pedestrians
- Attack type: Mass shooting
- Weapon: .40-caliber Smith & Wesson M&P semi-automatic pistol
- Deaths: 3 (including the perpetrator)
- Injuries: 13
- Perpetrator: Faisal Hussain
- Motive: Undetermined

A mass shooting occurred on Danforth Avenue in the Greektown neighbourhood of Toronto, Ontario, Canada on the night of July 22, 2018. Faisal Hussain killed two people and wounded thirteen using a Smith & Wesson M&P .40-calibre handgun. He died by suicide after a shootout with Toronto Police Service (TPS) officers. Despite a year-long investigation, authorities were unable to determine a motive for the shooting. They noted that Hussain had mental health issues and a long-time obsession with violence.

== Shooting ==
Around 10:00 p.m. EDT on July 22, 2018, Faisal Hussain walked along Toronto's busy Danforth Avenue in the Greektown area of the city, randomly shooting pedestrians before opening fire on crowded restaurants. The incident began around Danforth and Logan Avenues at the Alexander the Great Parkette. Hussain shot six people at and near the parkette, killing 18-year-old Reese Fallon. A seventh person was shot several businesses away at the Mezes restaurant. Hussain then proceeded to walk west along the north sidewalk of Danforth Avenue while firing rounds. Some witnesses described 10 to 15 blasts similar to firecrackers, while others reported hearing gunshots and seeing a man holding a gun.

Hussain briefly stopped in front of the restaurant Pappas Grill and fired shots into the business, injuring one person, then walked further west. Further along Danforth at Chester Avenue, he fired from a sidewalk into another restaurant named Demetre's, killing 10-year-old Julianna Kozis and injuring two other victims. At one point near Hampton Avenue, Hussain crossed the street from the north side to the south side to shoot into the Second Cup Coffee Co. business and at people along the south sidewalk. He wounded three people while at the front of the coffee shop. Hussain then continued to walk westbound on Danforth Avenue and turned south into Bowden Street. There, Hussain turned into an alleyway and tried to move west. He eventually walked into a dead-end and moved back east to leave the alleyway. In the process, Hussain spared a man and also unsuccessfully attempted to shoot another man.

Hussain left the alleyway and ran north up Bowden Street. From there, witnesses said he fired into the 7Numbers restaurant near Bowden Street, shooting one victim. As he was doing so, a police cruiser drove north up Bowden Street, and two police officers confronted Hussain. They initiated a shootout with him as he ran west. Hussain ran back to Danforth Avenue, where he was found dead from a self-inflicted gunshot wound to the head.

During the shooting, Hussain chose not to shoot certain people he encountered, telling one man, "Don't worry, I'm not going to shoot you." At the corner of Danforth and Logan Avenues, police cordoned off an area from bystanders and detonated an unidentified package for undisclosed reasons.

== Victims ==
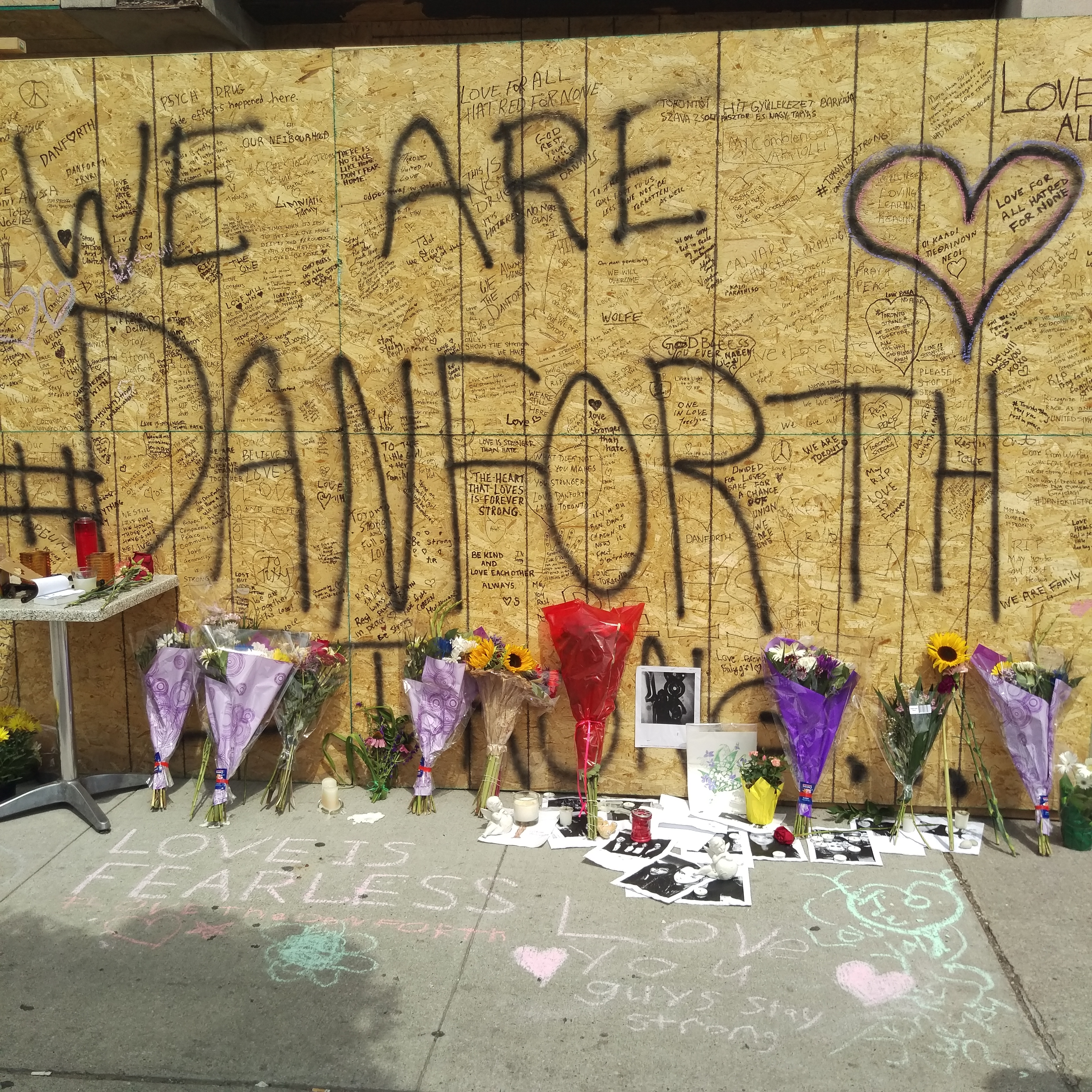
People of Toronto left floral tributes for 18-year-old Reese Fallon with the message "We are #Danforth"

18-year-old Reese Fallon and 10-year-old Julianna Kozis were killed in the attack.

Thirteen others suffered gunshot wounds, ranging in age from 17 to 59. Toronto Paramedic Services transported eight victims to trauma centres – including four people to St. Michael's Hospital, three to Sunnybrook Health Sciences Centre and one to The Hospital for Sick Children. St. Michael's reported it was treating five patients. Three of them underwent immediate lifesaving surgery after the shooting and the others were in serious but stable condition.

Two gunshot victims were treated at the nearby Michael Garron Hospital and were in stable condition. Five other patients were treated for issues related to the shooting, but were not shot.

== Perpetrator ==
The Special Investigations Unit (SIU) identified the perpetrator as 29-year-old Faisal Hussain.

Hussain was born to parents of Pakistani origin according to people who knew the family. In a public statement, Hussain's parents said that he was psychotic and depressed throughout his life. In 2010, Hussain told a friend that he was seeing a psychiatrist about these problems. A former teacher described him as "very disturbed" and recounted having to take him to a psychiatric facility after he started carving into his face with the blade of a pencil sharpener. Another former teacher called the police after Hussain allegedly said, without prompting, that "I want to kill someone." His family had been struggling through the death of his sister in a car accident and his brother's ongoing coma after an overdose or a stroke. According to a neighbour, Hussain was not religious and declined to participate in Friday prayers. According to his brother, Hussain had "started attending a mosque with his father, but did not seem that interested in religion."

In 2010, Hussain was investigated by TPS under the provincial Mental Health Act. On July 24, 2018, the Ministry of Public Safety said there is currently no connection between him and national security. He was not on any federal watchlists.

== Investigation ==
In the immediate aftermath of the shooting, police did not identify a motive, saying that they were investigating "every possible motive, including terrorism." In June 2019, authorities finished a year long investigation and could not determine a motive for the attack. Regarding the motive, Toronto police chief Mark Saunders said "we may never know why".

On July 23, police executed a search warrant at Hussain's residence in the Thorncliffe Park neighbourhood of the city. A day later, CBS News published that, according to a law enforcement source, Hussain visited ISIL websites which may have expressed his support for the Islamic militant group; he was also speculated to have previously lived in Afghanistan and Pakistan, but the investigation has revealed that his actions did not appear to be directed by ISIL. On July 25, Amaq News Agency, citing a "security source", stated that he was "from the soldiers of Islamic State", yet Toronto Police said there was no evidence of an ISIL connection. Amarnath Amarasingam of the London-based Institute for Strategic Dialogue doubted Amaq's claim and said it may have been prompted by the CBS News article. Police noted that Hussain had mental health issues and a long time obsession with violence. He also recently developed an interest in incel ideology and police found a copy of Elliot Rodger's manifesto in Hussain's phone and electronic equipment.

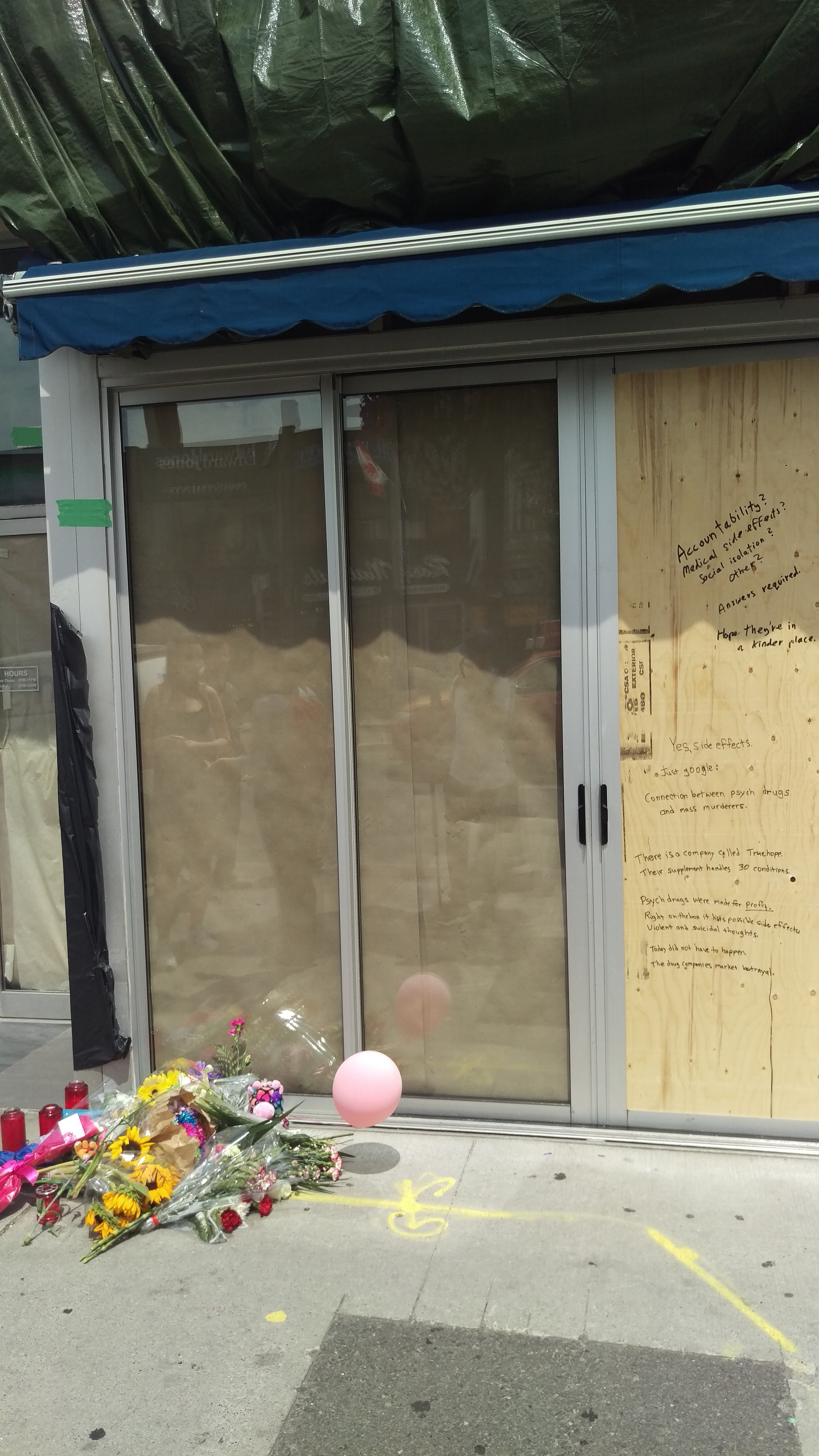
People of Toronto left floral tributes for 10-year-old Julianna Kozis

Since Hussain was found dead after a shootout, the SIU looked into whether he was shot by police or shot himself. On July 23, it removed a police cruiser from the scene and said the two officers in it were being investigated for their roles in the shootout. Hussain's handgun was also seized. On July 25, a police source told CBC News that Hussain died by suicide. The same day, a police source told CP24 that the gun was from the United States and had been obtained from a "gang-related source". A police source later told CTV News it had been stolen in 2015 during a Saskatoon burglary. It may have come to Hussain from his brother who lived at a house in Toronto's eastern suburb of Pickering where 33 guns were seized in 2017.

== Aftermath ==
Residents and business owners in the area started a crowdfunding campaign for funeral expenses of victims who died. Meanwhile, the Canadian Blood Services said that they were closely monitoring response efforts and were encouraging donations in the aftermath of the shooting.

The Toronto International Film Festival cancelled an event to promote its planned film slate out of respect for those affected by the shooting.

Another shooting in the area occurred exactly five years later, on July 22, 2023, where one male was killed. There is no evidence that the two events are connected.

== Reactions ==
Canadian Prime Minister Justin Trudeau and Minister of Public Safety and Emergency Preparedness Ralph Goodale tweeted their condemnation of the shooting and praise of the police. Ontario premier Doug Ford described the attack as "the most brazen shooting" of a year full of gun violence. Toronto Mayor John Tory called the shooting an "unspeakable act" and an attack on a city with a gun problem, and called on the federal government for a ban on handguns. He said he planned to discuss public safety and the legality of guns with provincial and federal officials.

The Ministry of Foreign Affairs of Greece expressed solidarity and condolence with the city's Greektown. Calvary Church, located near the site of the shooting, held a prayer vigil, joined by a congregation from the nearby Madinah Mosque.

The family of Faisal Hussain released a statement expressing "our deepest condolences to the families who are now suffering on account of our son's horrific actions".

Several sports teams and athletes showed their support on social media with the #TorontoStrong hashtag, which was also used after the van attack in North York City Centre in April 2018.
