= 2018 Toronto van attack =

Vehicle-ramming attack in Ontario, Canada

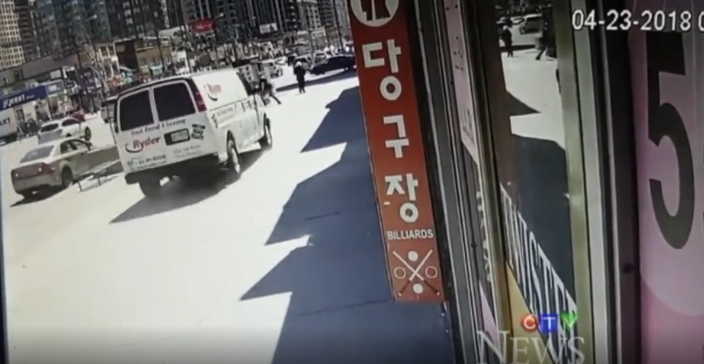
- A CCTV still of the van moments before hitting pedestrians

- Attack location (Toronto) Attack location (Canada)
- Location: North York City Centre, North York, Toronto, Ontario, Canada
- Date: April 23, 2018; 8 years ago 1:22 – 1:32 p.m. (EDT)
- Target: Pedestrians
- Attack type: Vehicle-ramming attack, mass murder
- Weapon: Chevrolet Express van
- Deaths: 11 (including a victim who died in 2021)
- Injuries: 15
- Perpetrator: Alek Minassian
- Motive: Disputed: • Acquiring fame or infamy, misogynist terrorism, revenge for sexual and social rejection, incel ideology (prosecution); • Severe mental illness, (defence)
- Verdict: Guilty on all counts
- Convictions: 10 counts of first-degree murder and 16 counts of attempted murder
- Sentence: Life imprisonment with no possibility of parole for 25 years

On April 23, 2018, a vehicle-ramming attack occurred when a rented van was driven along Yonge Street through the North York City Centre business district in Toronto, Ontario, Canada. The driver, 25-year-old Alek Minassian, targeted pedestrians, killing 11 (Note: Ten of the victims died on the day of the attack; the eleventh victim died on October 28, 2021, after being paralyzed from the neck down and never leaving hospital) and injuring 15, some critically. The attack started at the intersection of Yonge Street and Finch Avenue and proceeded south along the sidewalks of Yonge Street to near Sheppard Avenue. Nine of the eleven killed were women. The perpetrator was arrested just south of the crime scene, after exiting his vehicle and attempting to commit suicide by cop.

The attack was labelled by some as misogynist terrorism because Minassian claimed to be an incel seeking revenge for perceived rejection by women, following the lead of Elliot Rodger. Minassian pleaded not criminally responsible to the initial 10 counts of first-degree murder and 16 counts of attempted murder, but was found guilty on all counts. The presiding judge stated that pinpointing Minassian's exact motive was "close to impossible", but expert testimony suggested a desire for notoriety. In June 2022, Minassian was sentenced to life in prison with no possibility of parole for 25 years.

== Attack ==
On April 23, 2018, Minassian was dropped off by his father in front of a Chapters bookstore in Woodbridge, having lied about plans to meet a friend there. He then walked four kilometres to a Ryder rental outlet and picked up a van he had booked three weeks prior, telling the clerk that he would be using it to transport furniture. After paying the required deposit, Minassian drove away, traveling east along Highway 7 before turning south onto Yonge Street.

Upon reaching Finch Avenue West, Minassian noticed a congregation of people on the west sidewalk of Yonge Street and decided to begin the attack there. He drove onto the sidewalk and struck a group of pedestrians in front of a Korean barbecue restaurant, killing Ji Hun Kim and So He Chung. Continuing southward, Minassian fatally hit Geraldine Brady and Chul Min Kang at Tolman Street, then injured a man at Kempford Boulevard and fatally hit Mary Elizabeth Forsyth in front of a nail salon. After injuring five more pedestrians between Horsham and Churchill Avenues, Minassian re-entered the roadway of Yonge Street and drove against traffic, fatally hitting Munir Abdo Habib Najjar at Parkview Avenue. Minassian drove back onto the sidewalk at Park Home Avenue and struck six pedestrians from behind, killing Anne Marie D'Amico and Renuka Amarasingha, the latter of whom was dragged for over 150 metres.

At Mel Lastman Square, Minassian fatally hit three women. One victim, Andrea Bradden, was carrying a Starbucks beverage, which splashed onto the van's windshield and obscured Minassian’s view; Minassian later cited this as the reason he stopped driving. Just south of North York Boulevard, Minassian drove off Yonge Street into an alley that led to Beecroft Road; he continued driving south on Beecroft Road until re-entering Yonge Street via Bogert Avenue. Finally, he stopped his van on the sidewalk of Poyntz Avenue in front of a glass storefront.

Toronto Police Service constable Ken Lam intercepted Minassian's van on Poyntz Avenue, about 2.3 kilometres (1.4 mi) south of where the attack began. Lam stopped his unmarked cruiser near the van and confronted Minassian, who had exited the van and was standing near the opened driver-side door. During the confrontation, Minassian pointed a wallet toward Lam as if it were a gun and tried repeatedly to provoke Lam to kill him. When Lam realized that the object in Minassian's hand was not a gun, he holstered his pistol and took out his baton to avoid the use of unnecessary lethal force. Minassian then dropped the wallet and lay down on the ground. He was arrested at 1:32 p.m.

== Victims ==
Nine people died at the scene. That same evening, at 8:15 p.m., the Toronto Police Service announced that a tenth person had died. An eleventh person died on October 28, 2021, after being paralyzed from the neck down and never leaving the hospital. The dead, aged 22 to 94, consisted of nine women and two men, including two South Korean nationals and a Jordanian national.

Fifteen others, ten women and five men aged 21 to 90, were injured. They included three citizens of South Korea, an Iranian national, and a Russian national.

List of casualties
Category	People
Killed	Renuka Amarasingha, 45; Andrea Bradden, 33; Geraldine Brady, 83; So He Chung, 22; Anne Marie D'Amico, 30; Mary Elizabeth Forsyth, 94; Chul Min Kang, 45; Ji Hun Kim, 22; Munir Abdo Habib Najjar, 85; Dorothy Sewell, 80; Amaresh Tesfamariam, 65
Wounded	Xiaolong An, 21; Robert Anderson, 59; Mavis Justino, 42; Amir Kiumarsi, 52; Aleksandra Kozhevinikova, 90; Anthony McDougall, 26; Hyeon Jeong Moon, 25; Jun Seok Park, 33; Samantha Peart, 23; So Ra, 23; Catherine Riddell, 67; Dina Risin, 80; Sammantha Samson, 35; Beverly Smith, 81; Yunsheng Tian, 28

== Aftermath ==
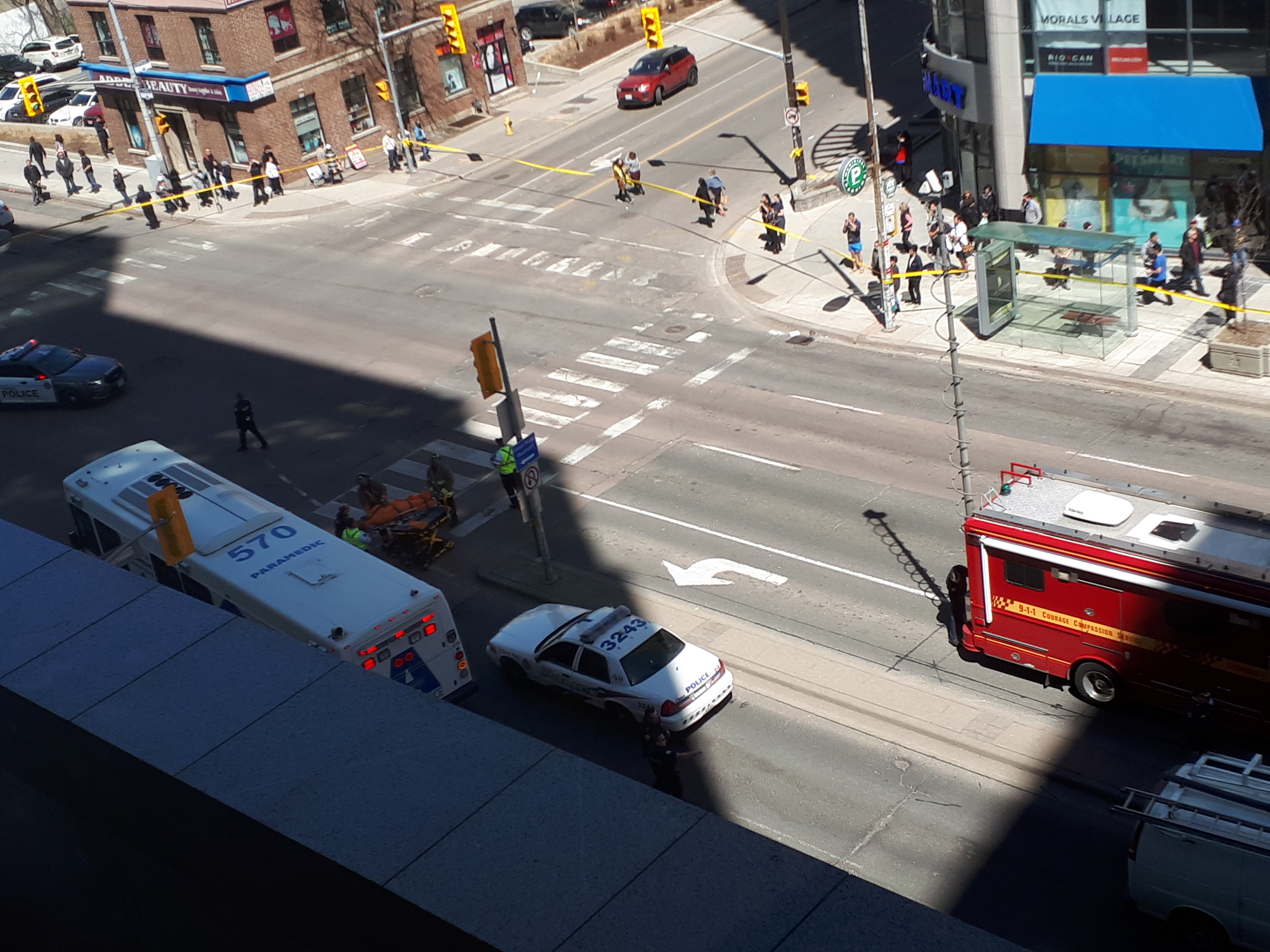
Toronto Police at the scene

In the immediate aftermath of the attack, the Toronto Transit Commission (TTC) shut down subway service on the Toronto subway's North York Centre station and diverted bus routes serving the area. For over 24 hours, police cordoned off sections of Yonge Street to conduct a forensic investigation, forcing civic buildings in the area to close. Parts of Yonge Street were cordoned off until late on April 24, 2018, for the police investigation. Civic buildings in the area were closed, and while local businesses were not mandated to close, those fronting the sites of pedestrian deaths were restricted to rear-entry access.

Security was tighened around a meeting of G7 security ministers being held in Toronto in advance of the 44th G7 summit in La Malbaie, Quebec. Ministers were briefed on the tragedy, which prompted them to add discussions on soft targets, terrorism and social media, and online youth radicalization. The incident was included in the 2018 Public Report on the Terrorism Threat to Canada.

Faisal Hussain, perpetrator of the 2018 Toronto shooting, had also developed an interest in inceldom prior to his attack, but police found no evidence of radicalization.

== Perpetrator ==
Alek Minassian
- Minassian in an undated photo from his LinkedIn personal page.
- Born: November 3, 1992 (age 34); North York, Ontario, Canada
- Citizenship: Canada
- Occupation: Software developer
- Status: Incarcerated
- Convictions: First-degree murder (10 charges); Attempted murder (16 charges)
- Penalty: Life imprisonment with the possibility of parole in 25 years
- Military career
- Branch: Canadian Army
- Service years: 0 (released after 16 days of training)
- Rank: Private (recruit)
- Service number: C23249161

Police identified the suspect as Alek Minassian, who had no prior criminal history. His father, Vahe, had moved from Armenia to Canada and worked as a software developer, and his mother, Sona, was from Iran and had a job at IT company Compugen Inc. Minassian was also an aspiring software and mobile app developer.

Minassian was born in North York, formerly an independent city, now a district of Toronto. According to his LinkedIn profile, he was a student at Seneca College in North York from 2011 to 2018 and lived in Richmond Hill. Minassian had attended Sixteenth Avenue Public School, an elementary school in Richmond Hill, in a special education class. His former classmates at Thornlea Secondary School in Thornhill described him as "not overly social" and "harmless". Minassian attended a special needs class for students within the autism spectrum while at Thornlea Secondary School; Minassian's mother is quoted as saying in a 2009 article that her son has Asperger syndrome.

In late 2017, Minassian enrolled in the Canadian Armed Forces for two months, before requesting voluntary release after 16 days of recruit training. A senior military official said that Minassian "wasn't adapting to military life, including in matters of dress, deportment and group interactions in a military setting" and "there were no red flags and nothing that would point to anything like this."

Following the attack, a Facebook post made by Minassian was uncovered in which he identified himself as an incel ("involuntary celibate"). The state of involuntary celibacy refers to being unable to find sexual partners and its subculture consists of primarily male online communities. The post, dated shortly before the beginning of the attack on April 23, read:

Private (Recruit) Minassian Infantry 00010, wishing to speak to Sgt 4chan please. C23249161. The Incel Rebellion has already begun! We will overthrow all the Chads and Stacys! All hail the Supreme Gentleman Elliot Rodger!

"Chad" and "Stacy" are nicknames used on incel-related forums within 4chan and Reddit to refer to popular, attractive, sexually active men and women, respectively. The term "Incel Rebellion" is sometimes used interchangeably with the term "Beta Uprising" or "Beta Male Uprising", which refers to a violent response to sexlessness. Elliot Rodger was the "incel founding father" who committed the 2014 Isla Vista killings in California, and someone whom Minassian claimed to have had contact with up until the days before the 2014 attacks. Rodger intended to target attractive women and sexually successful men, which led to him being posthumously idolized by some people on misogynistic online fringe communities, including several incel websites. Facebook, Inc. verified the account as belonging to Minassian. A source in the Department of National Defence told media that C23249161 was Minassian's military identification number during his army training.

== Legal proceedings ==
R. v. Minassian
- Court: Ontario Superior Court of Justice
- Full case name: Her Majesty the Queen v. Alek Minassian
- Decided: March 3, 2021
- Verdict: Guilty on all counts
- Citation: 2021 ONSC 1258

Court membership
- Judge sitting: Anne Molloy

On April 24, 2018, Minassian appeared without a lawyer before the Ontario Superior Court of Justice in a Toronto courthouse. He was charged with 10 counts of first degree murder and 13 counts of attempted murder and ordered not to contact any of the alleged attempted murder victims. His father, Vahe Minassian, was present in the gallery but told reporters that he had no contact to his son. By May 10, the attempted murder changes had increased to 16. Minassian later secured Toronto criminal defence lawyer Boris Bytensky to represent him. The subsequent legal proceedings faced repeated delays before the COVID-19 pandemic finally pushed the trial to November 2020.

The trial began on November 10, 2020, and was conducted over Zoom due to the COVID-19 pandemic. Minassian, who had already admitted to planning and carrying out the attack, pleaded not criminally responsible to the 10 counts of first-degree murder and 16 counts of attempted murder. During testimony on November 12, a psychiatrist retained by Minassian's defence team stated in a report that Minassian's "autistic way of thinking was severely distorted in a way similar to psychosis", despite Minassian not being technically psychotic. Attempts by Minassian and his defence to claim that he was not responsible for his actions due to his autism garnered criticism from autism rights advocates, who expressed concerns that the trial might worsen stigmas towards autistic people. Minassian was also found to be highly intelligent.

In the decision, Ontario Superior Court Justice Anne Molloy believed that Minassian seemed to be motivated by the desire for notoriety, and referred to him as "Mr. Doe" so as to avoid giving him further recognition. She wrote, "It is almost impossible to tell when Mr. Doe is lying and when he is telling the truth. Working out his exact motivation for this attack is likewise close to impossible," but that "nevertheless, I am inclined to accept the assessment of all of the experts that Mr. Doe did lie to the police about much of the incel motivation he talked about and that the incel movement was not in fact a primary driving force behind the attack." She also rejected his attempt to use his autism as a defence. On March 3, 2021, Minassian was found guilty on all counts in a verdict that was given by Molloy and streamed live on YouTube. However, sentencing was deferred until 2022 to await the decision of the Supreme Court of Canada in R v Bissonnette on whether prisoners can be made to serve murder sentences consecutively. On June 13, 2022, Minassian was sentenced to life in prison with no possibility of parole for 25 years. He filed a notice of appeal the following month, arguing among other things that the trial judge "misapprehended" expert evidence and made unreasonable findings.

=== Sporting events ===
Around the Air Canada Centre, roads were closed and blocked off with dump trucks, due to safety concerns for fans gathered at Maple Leaf Square to watch the National Hockey League playoff game between the Toronto Maple Leafs and Boston Bruins on the evening of April 23. A moment of silence was observed during the game in sympathy for the victims.

Concrete barriers were put up along the edge of the northern sidewalk along Bremner Boulevard in front of the Rogers Centre, due to the same safety concerns prior to the Toronto Blue Jays baseball game against the Boston Red Sox on April 24, 2018. Before the game, the Blue Jays honoured a few of the first responders in a ceremony, which included a video memorial for the victims of the attack followed by a moment of silence.

== Reaction ==
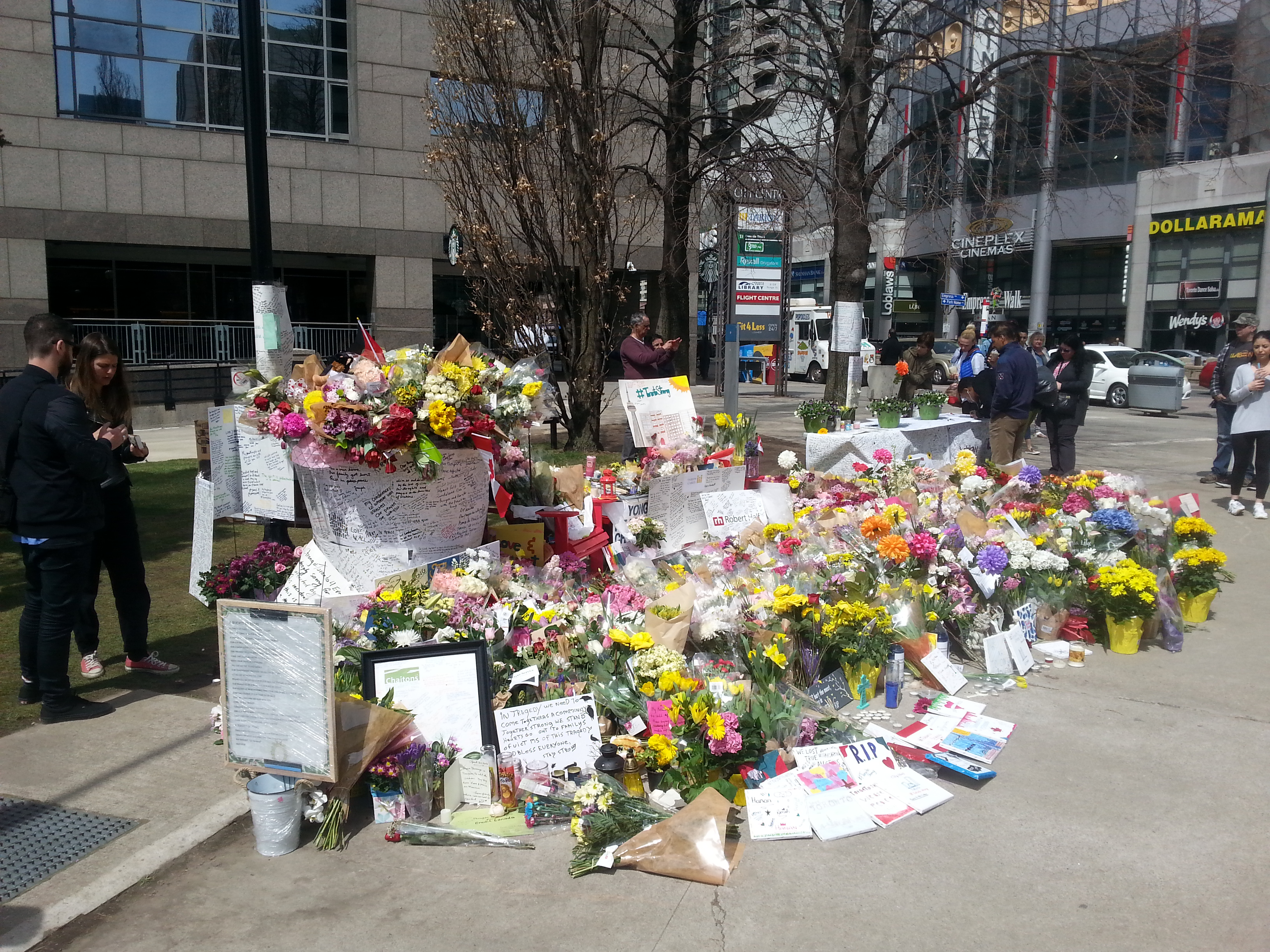
Memorial scene in Mel Lastman Square, April 27, 2018

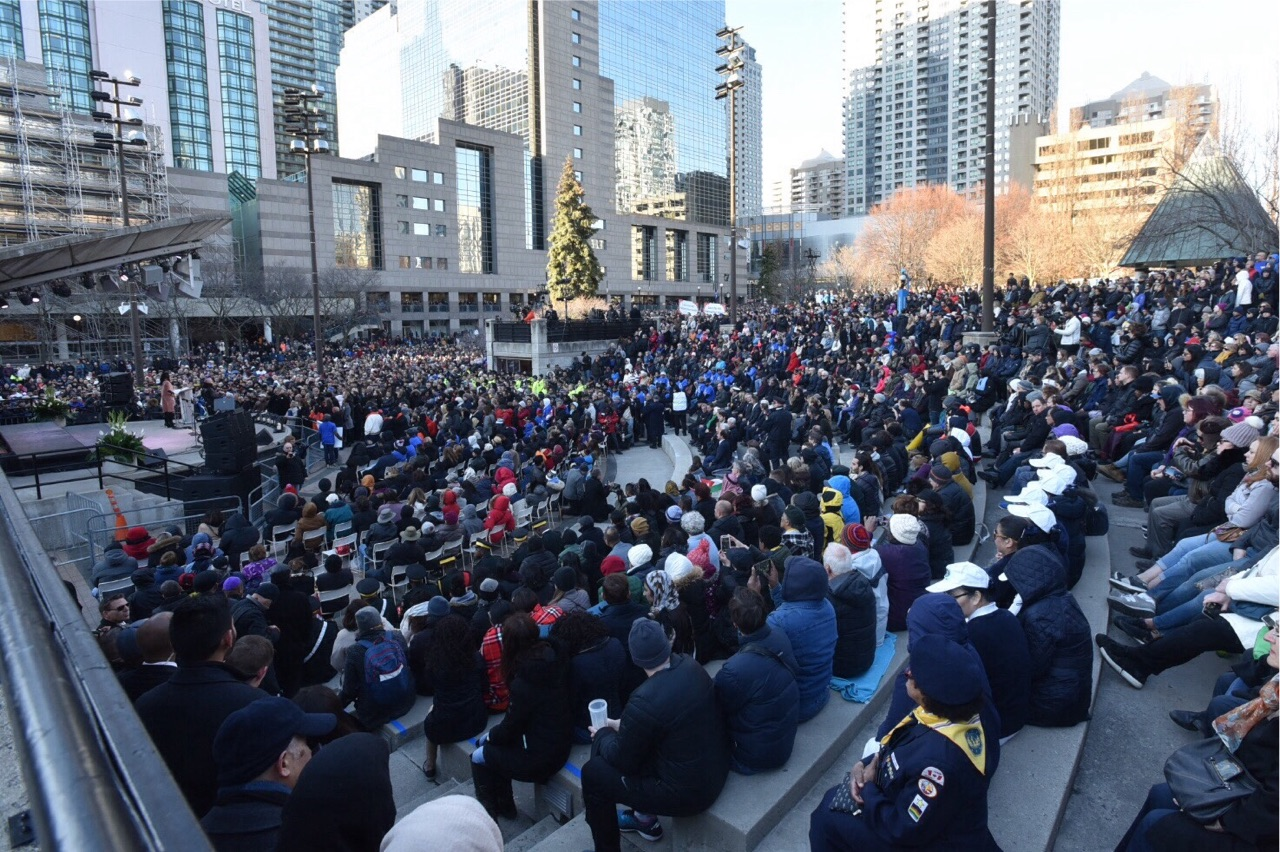
#Torontostrong vigil in Mel Lastman Square, April 29, 2018

Many domestic leaders expressed their support and condolences in the immediate aftermath of the attack, including Canadian Prime Minister Justin Trudeau, Opposition Leader Andrew Scheer, Ontario Premier Kathleen Wynne, and Toronto Mayor John Tory.

Constable Ken Lam was lauded as a hero for his measured use of force to achieve a non-fatal resolution of his confrontation with Minassian, despite Minassian's seeking suicide by cop. Lam insisted that he was simply performing his duty.

Lighting at the CN Tower and the 3D Toronto sign at Nathan Phillips Square were colourless and dimmed for the evening of April 23, 2018. Flags were placed at half-mast at most government locations in Toronto and surrounding municipalities.

An impromptu memorial at Olive Square Park on the east-side of Yonge Street, directly across the street from where the attack began, was started by a local resident at 5:15 p.m. of the same day for people to place flowers and express their grief in writing. The person who started the memorial indicated that all the other public spaces along Yonge Street, including Mel Lastman Square, were cordoned off by police tape so he chose Olive Square which was not cordoned off. Small memorials ranging from a few bunches of flowers to about two dozen bunches of flowers, plus paper messages, photographs and candles in some cases, were established at each location from just south of Finch Avenue to just south of Park Home Avenue where a pedestrian was killed (at the southwest corner of Yonge Street and Park Home Avenue two victims were killed). Next to the fountain at the entry to Mel Lastman Square, where the greatest number of people were struck (at least two killed), another memorial gradually grew to become a hub memorial almost as large as the one at Olive Square.

On April 26, 2025, three days after the 7th anniversary of the attack, Canterbury Place street signs in North York were temporarily renamed to "Heroes' Way" in tribute to first-responders. This occurred on the same day as the Vancouver car attack.

=== #TorontoStrong ===
Several crowdfunding campaigns were set up to raise money for the expenses of the victims' families. To better coordinate crowdfunding, the City of Toronto established the #TorontoStrong Fund to support victims and their families, first responders, and those affected by trauma. The hashtag was reused in memoriam of the victims of the fatal mass shooting that occurred in the Danforth on July 22 of the same year.

Several vigils were held in the following week. A small vigil was held at Lastman Square on the evening of April 24. Another was held by the Toronto Korean Community Association on April 27 at Lastman Square. An official #TorontoStrong Vigil was held by the City of Toronto on April 29, attended by several thousand. It began with a march from Yonge Street and Finch Avenue and ended with a gathering at Lastman Square. Speaking at the gathering were community leaders and the event was attended by Prime Minister Trudeau, Governor General Julie Payette, Premier Wynne, Quebec Premier Philippe Couillard, and Mayor Tory.

The two main impromptu memorials at Olive Square Park and Mel Lastman Square were decommissioned on June 3, 2018, and later replaced with a temporary plaque. Mayor John Tory announced plans to erect a permanent memorial for the attack.

On June 13, 2018, the #TorontoStrong's volunteer steering committee announced the appointment of former Toronto mayor Barbara Hall as fund administrator. She was tasked with distributing the money raised for the victims and survivors.

By December 2018, over CA$4 million from the fund had been distributed to victims and families of both the van attack and the Danforth shooting.

== See also ==
- 2014 Isla Vista killings – misogynistic terror attacks perpetrated by Elliot Rodger, by whom Minassian was inspired.
- Toronto machete attack – a terrorist attack in Toronto that was also motivated by misogyny directly inspired by Minassian
- École Polytechnique massacre – the second deadliest mass shooting in Canada, which was also motivated by misogyny
- 2021 London, Ontario, truck attack – a 2021 Islamophobic vehicle-ramming attack that targeted and killed four members of a Muslim family and injured a fifth
- Tsuyama massacre
- 2009 Collier Township shooting
- 2015 Umpqua Community College shooting
- 2018 Tallahassee shooting
- 2020 Nova Scotia attacks – the deadliest mass shooting in Canada
- 2025 Vancouver car attack
- Controversial Reddit communities, which include the subreddits /r/incels and /r/braincels, both of which are since banned for condoning violence, rape, and harassment towards women; the latter subreddit was created to circumvent the ban of the former
- Crime in Toronto
