= Olive Square Park =

Park in Toronto, Canada

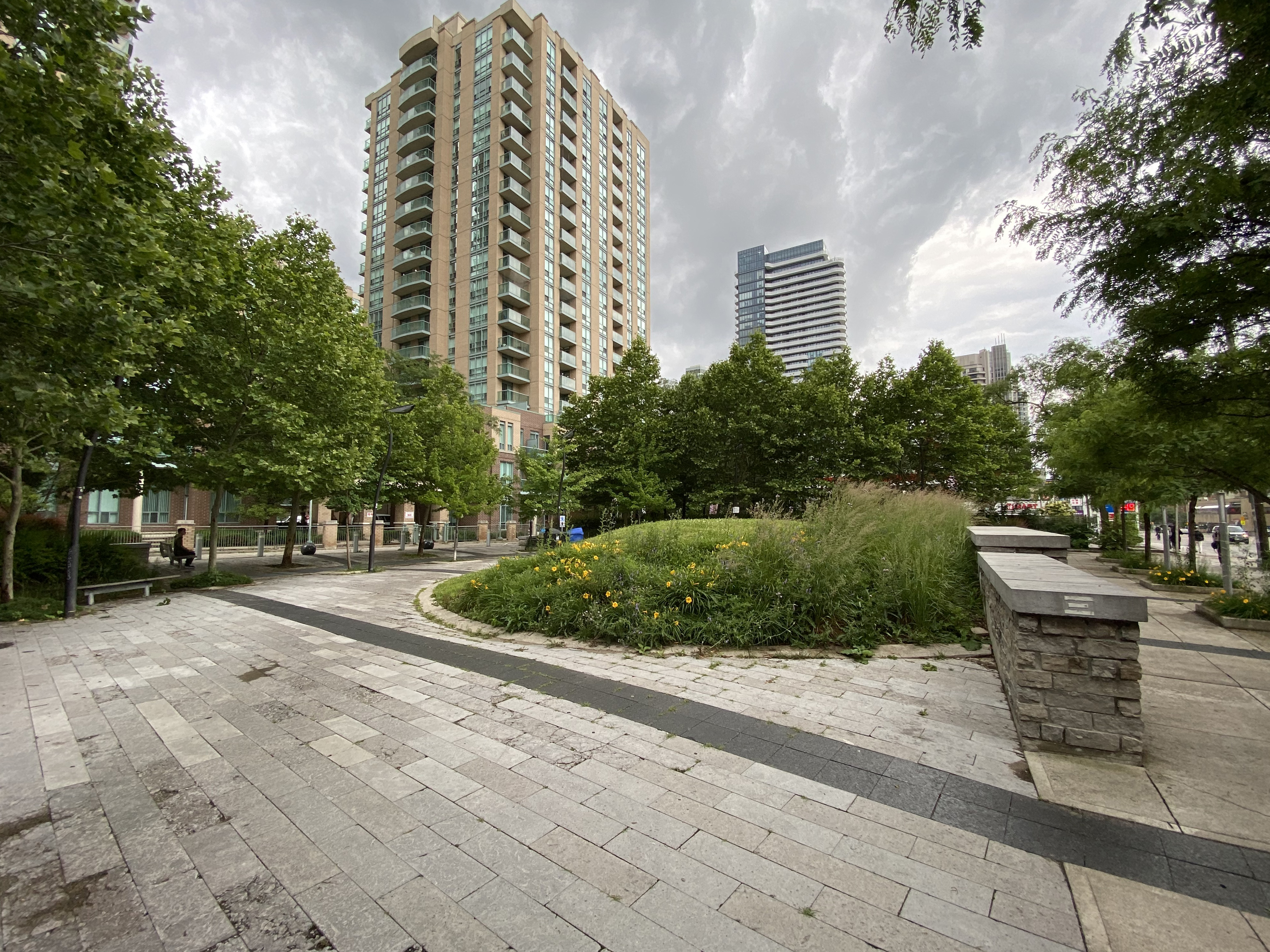
- Olive Square Park in 2023
- Interactive map of Olive Square Park
- Location: 5575 Yonge Street; Toronto, Ontario; M2N 5S4
- Coordinates: 43.7793731°N 79.4150625°W
- Created: 2012
- Operator: Toronto Parks
- Website: Olive Square Park

Olive Square Park is a park located in Toronto, Ontario, Canada, near the intersection of Yonge Street and Finch Avenue in the former city of North York. It opened in 2012.

After the Toronto van attack in 2018, a memorial was set up in the park for the victims.
