= Montreal school shooting =

Montreal school shooting or Montreal school massacre may refer to:

- 1989 École Polytechnique massacre
- 1992 Concordia University massacre
- 2006 Dawson College shooting

== See also ==
- Montreal shooting
