= 2020 Toronto machete attack =

2020 incel misogynist terrorist attack in Canada

Toronto machete attack
- Location: 43.731405°N 79.458929°W; Crown Spa, North York, Toronto, Ontario, Canada
- Date: February 24, 2020; ~12:00 pm (UTC−05:00)
- Attack type: Slashing
- Weapon: Machete (17-inch sword)
- Deaths: 1
- Injuries: 2 (including the perpetrator)
- Victim: Ashley Noell Arzaga
- Perpetrator: Oguzhan Sert
- Motive: Incel ideology
- Convictions: Murder - terrorist activity; Attempted murder - terrorist activity

On February 24, 2020, a misogynistic terrorist attack occurred at the Crown Spa, an erotic massage parlor located on Dufferin Street in North York, Toronto, Canada. Oguzhan Sert, who was 17 at the time, entered the spa with a 17-inch sword and killed one woman while seriously injuring another; the incident ended when the second injured victim fought back and disarmed him. Even though Sert was a minor during the attack, he was sentenced as an adult to life imprisonment with no chance of parole for 10 years. Canadian courts classified the homicide as the country's first act of terrorism motivated by incel ideology.

Forensic evidence from Sert's digital life showed that he had become radicalized in online communities, where he began viewing his plan as a contribution to a wider "incel rebellion". He directly named previous mass killers Alek Minassian and Elliot Rodger as the main inspirations for the stabbing.

== Background ==
The Crown Spa was a female-operated establishment offering erotic and exotic massages, located on Dufferin Street in the Downsview neighbourhood of North York. Sert lived less than two kilometres from the spa.

== Attack ==
Surveillance video showed the perpetrator leaving his home by foot towards the Crown Spa, less than two kilometres away. At around noon, he entered the spa and drew a 17-inch sword, killing receptionist Ashley Arzaga. The sword was engraved with the words "thot slayer".

The spa owner observed the attack and was set upon by the perpetrator. As the owner and the perpetrator struggled on the floor, the owner disarmed the perpetrator and stabbed him in the back, critically injuring him. During the attack, the perpetrator shouted misogynistic expletives. The spa owner suffered serious injuries to her arm and finger.

== Victims ==
Emergency crews were called to the spa after reports of a bleeding man and woman outside. They were taken to hospital with serious injuries.

Inside the spa, a woman was found dead. She was later identified as 24-year-old Ashley Noell Arzaga. She was described by friends as a doting mother to a five-year-old girl.

== Perpetrator ==
The 17-year-old perpetrator was arrested and charged with first degree murder and attempted murder. The Youth Criminal Justice Act initially prevented him from being named because of his age, but this was later revoked when his case was moved to an adult court. Multiple media sources identified him as Oguzhan Sert, born in Canada to a Mexican mother and Turkish father. He was later diagnosed with depression, anxiety, and autism spectrum disorder.

A note was found on the perpetrator which read "Long Live the Incel Rebellion". The perpetrator told paramedics that he had come to the spa to kill everyone inside the building and that he was glad to have killed one person. A forensic search of the perpetrator's computer found web searches related to incels and images of Alek Minassian (whom he called an "inspiration") and Elliot Rodger. The perpetrator's profile on Steam stated that he was a "Proud Incel". When asked by police why he identified as an incel, the perpetrator stated: "You don't choose to become an incel. You are born one".

== Legal proceedings ==
In May 2020, the charges were upgraded to "murder—terrorist activity" and "attempted murder—terrorist activity". In a joint statement, the Royal Canadian Mounted Police and Toronto Police Service announced that investigations had determined that the attack "was inspired by the Ideologically Motivated Violent Extremist (IMVE) movement commonly known as INCEL". Incels are members of a misogynistic online subculture that define themselves as unable to find a romantic or sexual partner. The RCMP and TPS also said, "As a result, federal and provincial Attorneys General have consented to commence terrorism proceedings, alleging that the murder was terrorist activity ... and the attempted murder was terrorist activity." This was the first time in Canada that someone was charged with terrorism because of a misogynist ideology.

On September 14, 2022, the perpetrator entered a guilty plea to murder and attempted murder. During his sentencing, he expressed regret, claiming that "it wasn't worth it". On June 6, 2023, the attack was ruled a terrorist attack by Ontario's Superior Court, marking the first time in Canada that an accused was found to have committed an incel-ideologically motivated terrorist act. On November 28, 2023, the perpetrator was sentenced to life in prison with no possibility of parole for 10 years. Additionally, a concurrent three-year sentence was imposed for attempted murder.

== See also ==
- 2021 Atlanta spa shootings
- 2018 Toronto van attack, misogynist terror attack perpetrated by 25-year-old Alek Minassian, by whom Sert was inspired.
- 2014 Isla Vista killings, misogynist terror attack perpetrated by 22-year-old Elliot Rodger, by whom Sert was inspired.
