= 2018 Tallahassee shooting =

Mass shooting in Florida, U.S.

- Location: 30.4672°N 84.2690°W; Hot Yoga Tallahassee; 1950 Thomasville Rd; Tallahassee, Florida, U.S.
- Date: November 2, 2018; 7 years ago 5:37 p.m. (EDT; UTC−04:00)
- Target: Women
- Attack type: Mass shooting, murder–suicide, femicide
- Weapon: 9mm Glock 17 Gen5 semi-automatic pistol
- Deaths: 3 (including the perpetrator)
- Injuries: 5 (4 by gunfire, 1 by pistol-whipping)
- Perpetrator: Scott Paul Beierle
- Motive: Misogynist terrorism, revenge for sexual and social rejection

On November 2, 2018, a mass shooting occurred at Tallahassee Hot Yoga, a yoga studio located in Tallahassee, Florida, United States. Scott Paul Beierle shot six women, two fatally, and pistol-whipped a man before killing himself.

Criminal investigators attested to the attacker's hatred of women. The US Secret Service and International Centre for Counter-Terrorism consider the attack an act of misogynist terrorism.

== Shooting ==
Beierle entered the hot yoga studio at 5:37 p.m. EDT on November 2, 2018, shooting six people, resulting in the deaths of two women, Maura Binkley, 21, and Dr. Nancy Van Vessem, 61. Officers responded to reports of gunfire within three and a half minutes and found the perpetrator deceased. Partygoers in a bar across the street told reporters they saw people fleeing from the studio and that a man in a bloody white T-shirt who ran into the bar claimed to have charged the shooter only to be pistol whipped. This claim was later confirmed in interviews with survivors who stated that the male customer used a vacuum cleaner and then a broomstick to attack Beierle, which gave other students time to escape. Tallahassee Police Chief Michael DeLeo also credited the students who "fought back and tried not only to save themselves but other people".

The shooter fired 14 bullets including the suicide shot.

The yoga studio was a part of a plaza occupied by restaurants and other businesses. Those eating at the restaurant beneath the studio heard the gunshots and told reporters that the owner came through the dining area shortly after, asking if anyone was a doctor.

== Victims ==
When officers arrived, it was discovered that six people were shot in the attack. Two victims, Maura Binkley and Nancy Van Vessem, were deceased at the scene. Binkley, age 21, was a student at Florida State University, and due to graduate in 2019. Dr. Nancy Van Vessem, age 61, was a doctor, the chief medical director for Capital Health Plan, and a faculty member at Florida State University.

== Perpetrator ==
Scott Paul Beierle (October 6, 1978 – November 2, 2018) was later revealed as the perpetrator by police. According to his social media profiles on Facebook and LinkedIn, Beierle was a military veteran and former teacher for the Anne Arundel County Public School System in Maryland, teaching both English and social studies at Meade High School and being affiliated with conservative groups such as FSU College Republicans and We Are Conservatives. Additionally, Beierle had taught at numerous other schools as a substitute teacher, yet only briefly due to performance issues and inappropriate behavior. In one instance, he was fired for an incident where he reportedly asked a female student if she was "ticklish", while touching her "below the bra line" on her stomach. He was charged twice for battery, in 2012 and 2016, both times accused of grabbing a woman's buttocks.

YouTube videos posted by Beierle in 2014 showed that he identified with the involuntary celibate community while often complaining about sexual rejections from women. He also sympathized with the shooter behind the 2014 Isla Vista attacks, Elliot Rodger, as he too felt lonely and unloved as well as posting misogynistic songs on SoundCloud. Other videos depicted him ranting about African Americans, illegal immigration, and interracial relationships. One of the videos was named "Dangers of Diversity".

The FBI and Tallahassee Police Department attested to Beierle's hatred of women, saying he was "disturbed" during the shooting. They further noted he planned the attack months in advance. The International Centre for Counter-Terrorism lists the attack as an act of misogynist terrorism.

== Aftermath ==
Florida State University held a vigil for the victims on November 4, while another series of tributes was planned for November 5 with the help of Tallahassee's Delta Delta Delta sorority chapter, of which victim Maura Binkley was a member. Other tributes were published by the deceased's families and friends through social media. On November 11, a candlelit vigil was held at Cascades Park. The day after the shooting, a yoga instructor of Hot Yoga Tallahassee led a yoga class for healing in the middle of Adams Street. In 2019, Binkley's parents sued the yoga studio and property owner claiming both were negligent in providing adequate safety.

Maura's Voice Research Fund (MVRF) at the Florida State University College of Social Work was established by Maura's parents, Jeff and Margaret Binkley, to honor her legacy and dedication to serving others. MVRF supports academic and legal research focused on hate crimes and prevention of violence against women and girls and is committed to effective practices and policy reforms.

In 2022, the Secret Service's National Threat Assessment Center released a detailed case study of the shooting. The report says the attacker is typical of misogynist extremism or male supremacist violence. He was arrested for groping women, wrote violent songs about torturing women, and admired mass killers who targeted women.

== See also ==
- List of rampage killers in the United States
- Tsuyama massacre
- 2009 Collier Township shooting
- 2014 Isla Vista killings
- 2015 Umpqua Community College shooting
- 2018 Toronto van attack
- 2025 Florida State University shooting
