= 2009 Collier Township shooting =

Mass shooting in Pennsylvania, U.S.

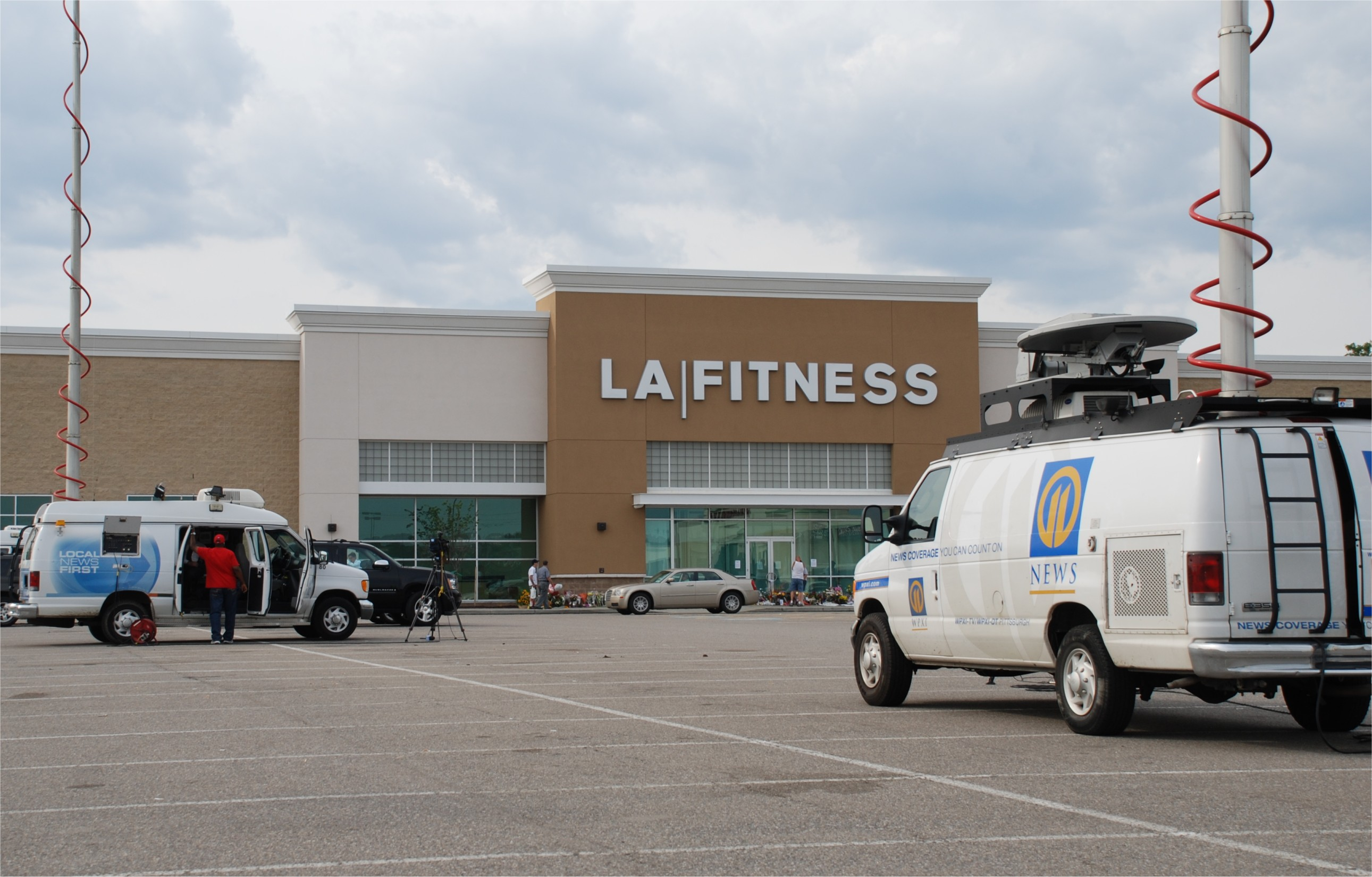
- The scene in Collier Township at an LA Fitness center where the shooting took place on August 4, 2009
- Location: 40°22′11″N 80°06′14″W; Collier Township, Allegheny County, Pennsylvania, U.S.
- Date: August 4, 2009; 17 years ago c. 8:15 p.m. (EDT)
- Target: Women
- Attack type: Mass shooting; murder-suicide; femicide; mass murder
- Weapons: Two 9mm Glock semi-automatic pistols; .32-caliber semi-automatic pistol (unused); .45 Colt revolver (perpetrator's suicide)
- Deaths: 4 (including the perpetrator)
- Injuries: 9
- Perpetrator: George Alfred Sodini
- Motive: Misogyny and rage caused by social rejection

The 2009 Collier Township shooting, also known as the Bridgeville LA Fitness shooting, was a mass shooting that took place on August 4, 2009, in an LA Fitness health club in Collier Township, a suburb of Pittsburgh, Pennsylvania. The perpetrator, George Sodini, killed three people and injured nine others before committing suicide. The fitness center is approximately 10 miles (16 km) south of Pittsburgh, in the Great Southern Shopping Center, a strip mall located in the Kirwan Heights section of Collier Township, just outside of the borough of Bridgeville.

== Shooting ==
The shooting occurred at a women's aerobics class at the LA Fitness center at approximately 8:15 p.m. The shooter entered the class, where at least 20 people were working out, placed a duffel bag on the ground, turned off the lights, took out two handguns and began firing. According to police, the gunman fired 52 shots with two Glock 9mm semi-automatic pistols before committing suicide by shooting himself in the head with a .45 Colt revolver. A .32-caliber semiautomatic pistol found in his pocket was not used.

Three women were killed, and nine other people were injured. The Allegheny County Medical Examiner's office identified the three women who died as Heidi Overmier, 46, of Collier Township; Elizabeth Gannon, 49, of Green Tree, Pennsylvania; and Jody Billingsley, 37, of Mt. Lebanon, Pennsylvania.

== Perpetrator ==
George Alfred Sodini (September 30, 1960 – August 4, 2009), a 48-year-old systems analyst at the law firm of K&L Gates and a resident of Scott Township, was identified as the perpetrator. He had written about contemplating carrying out a shooting, which he referred to as the "exit plan", while also revealing that he "chickened out" of carrying out such a shooting earlier in the year. His website states that he was "never married" and concludes "Death Lives!" Sodini states, "Probably 99% of the people who know me well don't even think I was this crazy." Sodini is reported to have left a note inside the gym bag stating his hatred for women. Nearly a week after the murders, it was revealed that Sodini had brought an inert grenade on a Port Authority bus on July 28, 2009. After a passenger sitting next to him notified police, he was questioned about the incident but no charges were filed.

On a website registered in his name, Sodini chronicled over a nine-month period his rejections by women and his severe sexual frustration. "Who knows why? I am not ugly or too weird. No sex since July 1990 either (I was 29)", he writes. "Last time I slept all night with a girlfriend it was 1982. Girls and women don't even give me a second look ANYWHERE". About his problems with women, he wrote: "Women just don't like me. There are 30 million desirable women in the US (my estimate) and I cannot find one". In 2008, Sodini posted online videos, in which he discusses his emotions, along with a tour of his home, the latter of which was a homework assignment from "a self-help seminar [he] had attended on how to date women".

TGSCOM Inc., an online gun wholesaler based in Green Bay, Wisconsin, sold Sodini an empty Glock 9 mm magazine and magazine loading apparatus used in the attack. TGSCOM sold a used handgun to Seung-Hui Cho, who subsequently used it during the 2007 Virginia Tech shooting. TGSCOM also sold an empty magazine and a holster to Steven Kazmierczak, who shot and killed five people at Northern Illinois University in 2008. TGSCOM closed in 2012, having become the subject of investigations by the U.S. Bureau of Alcohol, Tobacco, Firearms and Explosives, the Wisconsin Better Business Bureau, and Green Bay police.

On August 18, it was revealed that Sodini bequeathed his estate, valued at $225,000, to his alma mater the University of Pittsburgh. A spokesperson for the university stated that it had "no interest in receiving any such distribution" and requested that it go to the victims and the victims' families.

In March 2012, State Farm Fire and Casualty Co. filed a legal motion attempting to preemptively seek exemption from liability under Sodini's $100,000 personal liability policy. Victims of the shooting claim that the insurance company neglected to ensure Sodini got mental health care.

== Aftermath ==
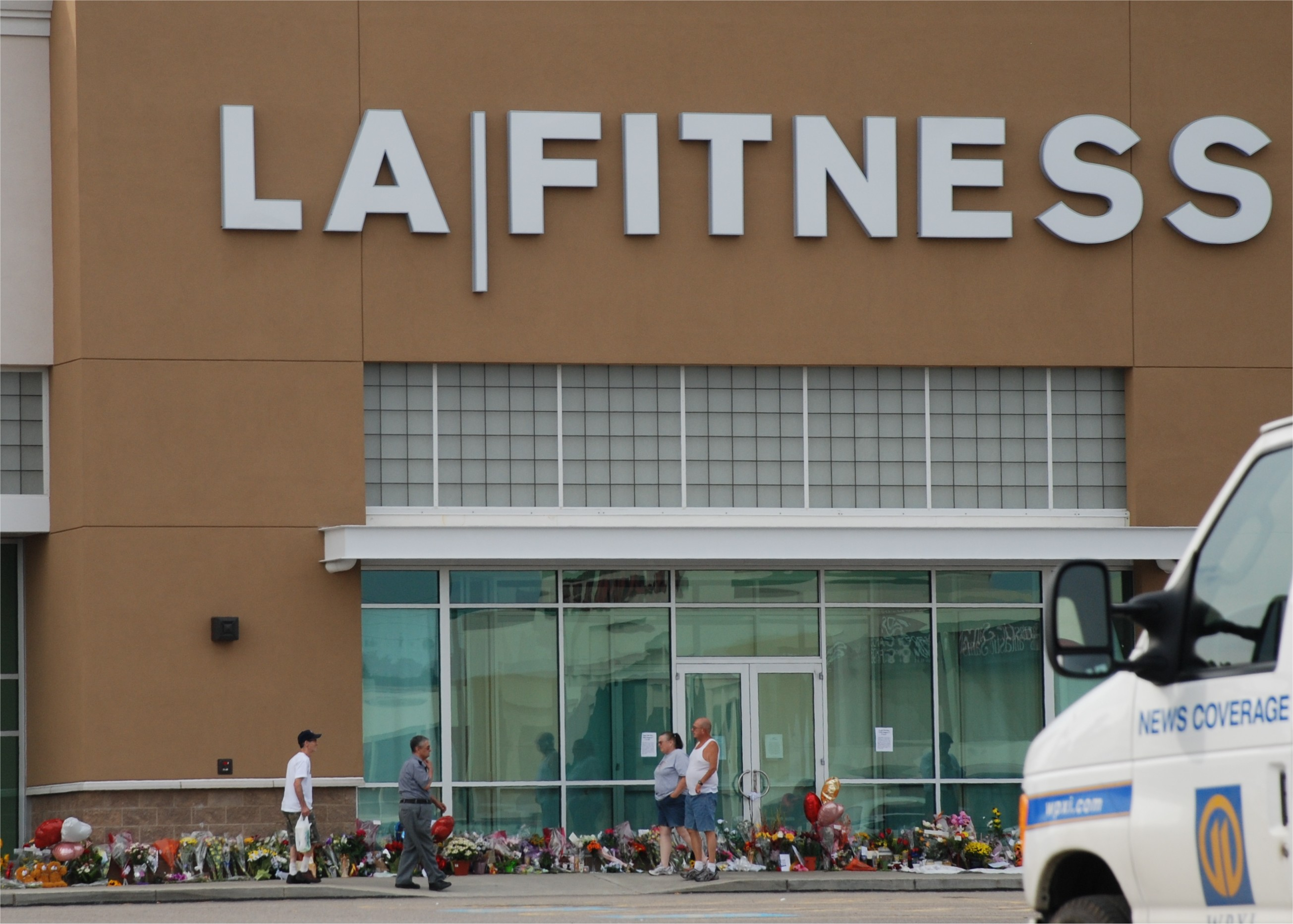
Flowers and remembrances left at the scene of the August 4, 2009 murder

On August 6, 2009, approximately 75 people, including friends, women's rights advocates, clergy members, and local officials, held a vigil at the Pittsburgh City-County Building in downtown Pittsburgh in honor of the shooting's victims. In the aftermath, some feminist groups attributed misogyny and toxic masculinity as a contributing factor.

George Sodini has since widely been discussed online by the incel movement. He is considered one of the first incel killers.

== See also ==
- List of rampage killers in the United States
- Tsuyama massacre
- 2014 Isla Vista killings
- 2015 Umpqua Community College shooting
- 2018 Tallahassee shooting
- 2018 Toronto van attack
- Plymouth shooting
- 1989 École Polytechnique massacre
