= Misogynist terrorism =

Terrorism motivated by the desire to punish women

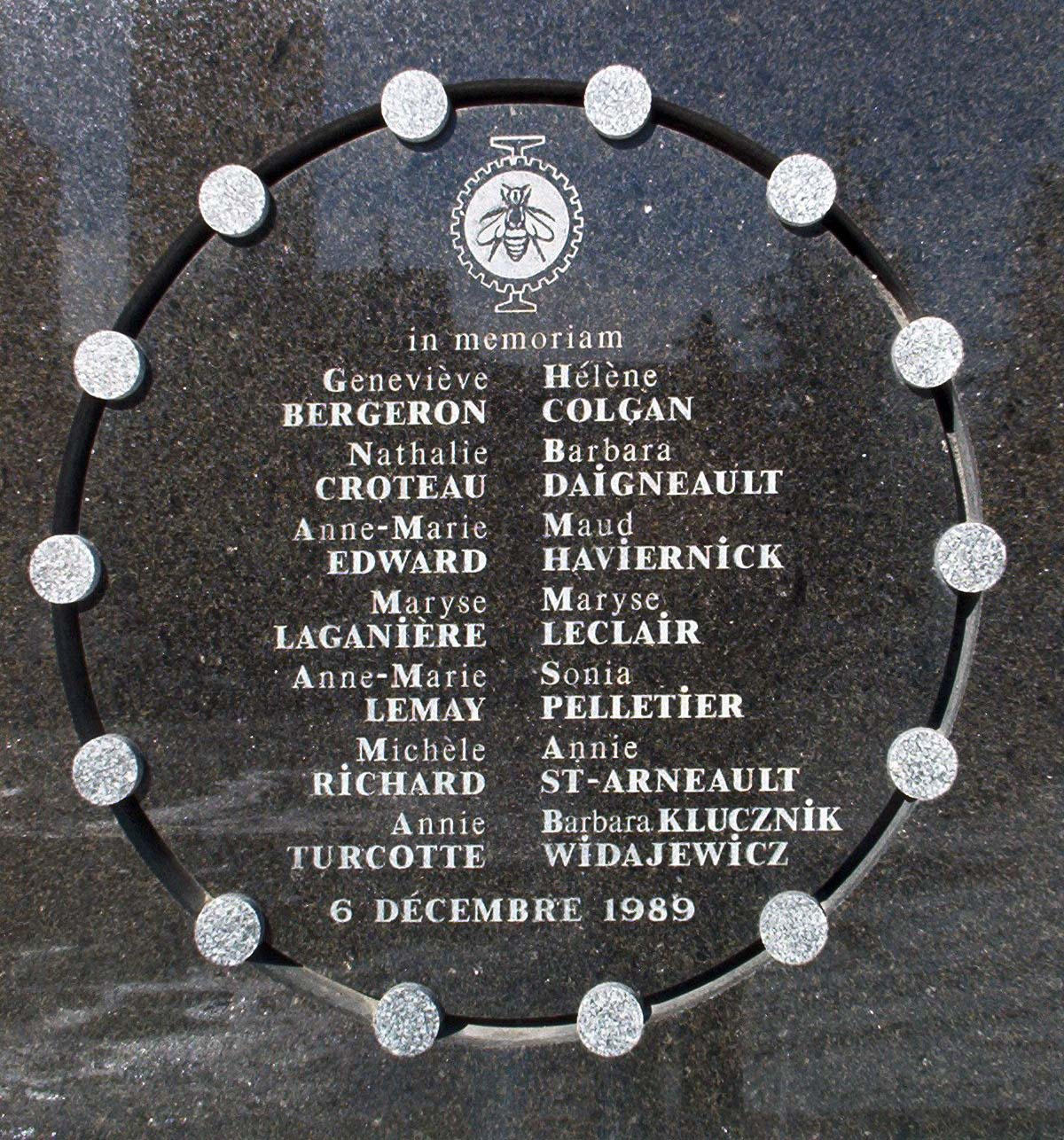
A plaque memorializing victims of the 1989 École Polytechnique massacre, which targeted women students in the Canadian city of Montreal

Misogynist terrorism, also called misogynistic extremism, male supremacist terrorism and incel terrorism, refers to one of the most extreme manifestations of misogyny and violence against women. This type of terrorism specifically targets women and girls by subjecting them to mass murder and bodily harm. Those who commit such acts may have either complex motives or a simple motive, but the majority of cases include a general desire to establish or assert perceived male supremacy by policing women's compliance to patriarchy and violently punishing them into submission to certain gender norms.

Misogynist or male supremacist ideologies have been listed and tracked by counter-terrorist organizations as an emerging terrorist threat globally. Often, misogynist terrorists target representatives or stand-ins for a type of person that they feel hostility towards. For instance, some attacks have been motivated by a perception of entitlement (which is not fulfilled) to sexual intercourse with women of a type that the terrorist finds attractive. A number of misogynist terrorists who have been motivated largely or solely by lack of sexual success with women in their personal lives have identified with the "incel" (lit. 'involuntary celibate') community, which also antagonizes men who do not have problems in engaging in romantic or sexual relationships with women.

== Recognition ==
According to the International Centre for Counter-Terrorism (ICCT) at the Hague, counter-terrorism experts were slow to recognize misogyny as an animating ideology for acts of mass violence in comparison to recognition of other ideologies. The National Consortium for the Study of Terrorism and Responses to Terrorism (START) and the Southern Poverty Law Center (SPLC) have tracked misogyny or male supremacy as a motivation for terrorism since 2018, describing it as a "rising threat."

The Australian Security Intelligence Organisation considers misogynist violence among the fastest-growing terrorism threats of 2021. A guidebook for law enforcement by the Organization for Security and Co-operation in Europe notes that strict and systematic control of gender roles is used as a recruitment tool both by ISIL/Daesh and by Western misogynist extremists among the incel and men's rights movements. Both groups portray men as hyper-masculine warriors and women variously as passive caretakers, sources of sexual gratification, and "the enemy" who must be punished.

The 1989 École Polytechnique massacre is recognized as the first documented mass killing explicitly motivated by antifeminist resentment. The shooter, who killed 14 women and injured 10, stated that his motivations were "political" and that he intended to "fight feminism."

Misogynist ideology is often not mentioned in reports of terrorist attacks, even when attackers explicitly state it.

== Motivations ==
Misogyny is common among mass killers, even among those who kill for other reasons. The following are specifically misogynist motivations that have been given as primary reasons for indiscriminate mass killings.

=== Sexual entitlement towards women ===
Sexual entitlement alone has been a primary motivator for acts of terror. The ICCT has found that anti-feminist conspiracy theories are typically combined with other far-right ideologies in motivating terrorists; however, sexual entitlement may be a motivation that stands by itself. In the 2014 Isla Vista attack, the perpetrator set out to "punish all females for the crime of depriving me of sex." As of 2020, incel ("involuntarily celibate") ideology has been a contributing factor to a further 90 fatalities and injuries.

Feminist writer Jessica Valenti writes that mass killers of women have described being motivated by a perception of entitlement to sex or companionship with women, and a desire to seek revenge for being rejected by women. Valenti argues that incels should be viewed as misogynist terrorists and warns that they are being radicalized online.

Journalist and editor Laurie Penny writes that misogynist extremism is motivated by an ideology of men's entitlement to women's attention, love, sex, and obedience.

=== Male supremacism ===
In some attacks or threats of terrorism, the perpetrator has described a desire to reinforce male superiority in a sexual hierarchy by preventing women from being recognized for their work or tolerated in leadership positions. For example, feminist video game critic Anita Sarkeesian received threats of mass shooting and bombing unless a ceremony in which she was to be given an award was canceled. The ICCT argues that the Hanau terrorist attack should be understood as motivated by male supremacism, despite the perpetrator sharing some beliefs of incels.

=== Proving masculinity ===
According to feminist author Laura Bates, online extremist groups present stereotypes of masculinity such as strength, a lack of vulnerability, and a lack of emotion as solutions to the problems and insecurities faced by young men, such as workplace injuries, cancer, and suicide. However, she says, these stereotypes actually cause or exacerbate the problems they claim to solve. Bates says that this ideological grooming can lead to calls for mass violence against women and that when this occurs, it should be categorized as terrorism.

Valenti writes that some misogynist terrorists have been motivated by a desire to live up to the stereotype that "real men" are powerful.

Incel beliefs can include an abhorrence of men who are perceived as sexually successful with women. Male victims of misogynist violence have been targeted because of a desperation to assert superiority over these men.

=== Spreading fear among women ===
As is typical of terrorism, these acts are intended to cause widespread fear. Any woman may reasonably be unsettled about the potential of being targeted, notes philosopher Kate Manne, because often victims of these killings are treated as essentially interchangeable. Women are targeted merely because they fit a certain type rather than because they have any particular relationship to the killer.

Misogyny need not mean hostility to women universally, or even very generally. Instead, misogynist terrorists often express a desire to target women of a particular type, either as revenge for perceived slights or because of a perceived connection between the targeted women and feminism. However, the women targeted have no actual connection to a terrorist targeting indiscriminately; instead, they are viewed as representatives or stand-ins for the women he wishes to harm.

== Responses ==
Like other forms of terrorism, misogynist extremist violence is intended to make a political statement. However, political responses to this form of terrorism have been less proactive than the governmental response to Islamic terrorism and other forms of terrorism.

Counter-terrorist response is complicated by cultural attitudes toward misogynist crimes in general. Such crimes tend to be viewed as a "private issue" rather than a proper political subject. Further, because incel attacks sometimes target both men and women indiscriminately, the gender-based motivation of these attacks has been difficult to recognize.

=== Prosecutions ===
Christopher Cleary pled guilty to a charge of attempted threat of terrorism for an attack he planned against the 2019 Women's March rally in Provo, Utah. This was the first terrorism-related sentence given to a male supremacist perpetrator motivated primarily by sexual entitlement.

The 2020 Toronto machete attack, in which the perpetrator was associated with an incel group, is the first known instance of someone charged with terrorism on the basis of a misogynist ideology.

In January 2021, a man in Edinburgh, Scotland, was convicted and jailed for breaking terrorism laws by acquiring weapons in preparation for a misogynist attack.

=== Mitigation ===
Writers at the Institute for Research on Male Supremacism note that acts of misogynist mass violence can be placed on a continuum with intimate partner abuse, stalking, and other gender-based harassment and violence. They recommend addressing misogynist terrorism with the same approaches applied to these other problems, such as with domestic abuse perpetrator intervention programs.

Australian researchers have recommended securitisation of incel ideology, as has been done for other ideologies that animate terrorism.

Jessica Valenti recommends that feminism build a helpful alternative culture for young men, as it has successfully for young women, which would give young men an alternative to misogynist online communities when seeking respite from mainstream culture's constraints.

== Noted incidents ==
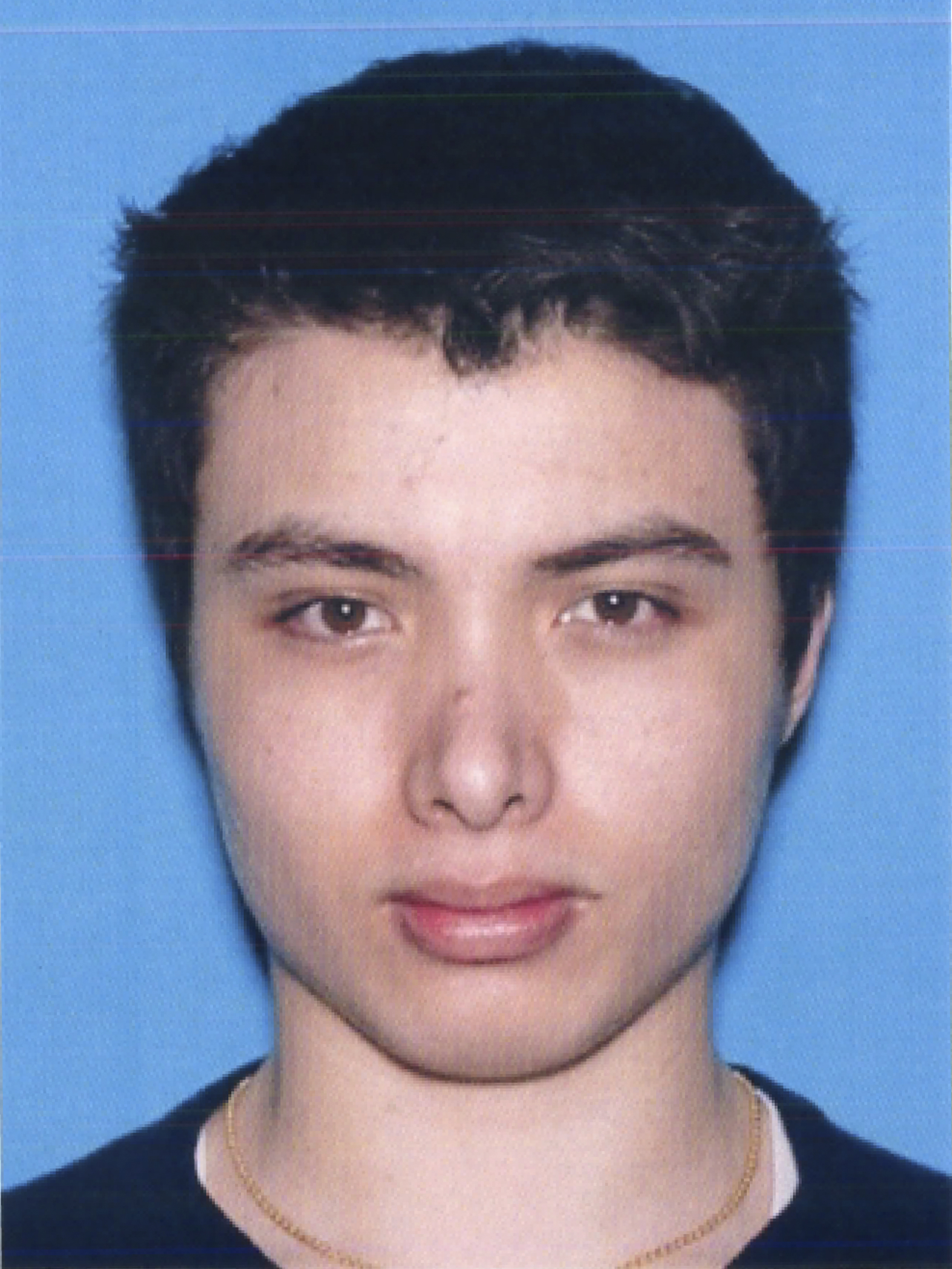
Elliot Rodger, perpetrator of the 2014 Isla Vista attacks

- 1984 Cleveland Public Library shooting
- 1989 École Polytechnique massacre
- 1991 Luby's shooting
- 2009 Collier Township shooting
- 2011 Rio de Janeiro school shooting
- 2014 Isla Vista attacks (Note: According to Alex DiBranco: "No misogynist killer articulated the terroristic intention behind his selected target more clearly than 22-year-old Elliot Rodger, who set out on his 'War on Women' to 'punish all females for the crime of depriving me of sex.' The autobiography he left behind—which has been taken as a manifesto for the incel ideology—spells this out.")
- 2014–2015 Portsmouth knife attacks
- 2015 Umpqua Community College shooting
- 2018 Toronto van attack
- 2018 systematic shooting of female drivers in Texas
- 2018 Tallahassee shooting
- 2019 Dayton shooting
- 2020 Toronto machete attack
- 2020 Westgate Entertainment District shooting
- 2021 Plymouth shooting
- 2025 Spišská Stará Ves school stabbing
- 2025 CCH sur school stabbing
- 2025 Otley Run pub crawl attack
- 2026 Lázaro Cárdenas school shooting

== See also ==
- Violence against women
- Single-issue terrorism
