= Compugen Inc. =

Canadian IT company

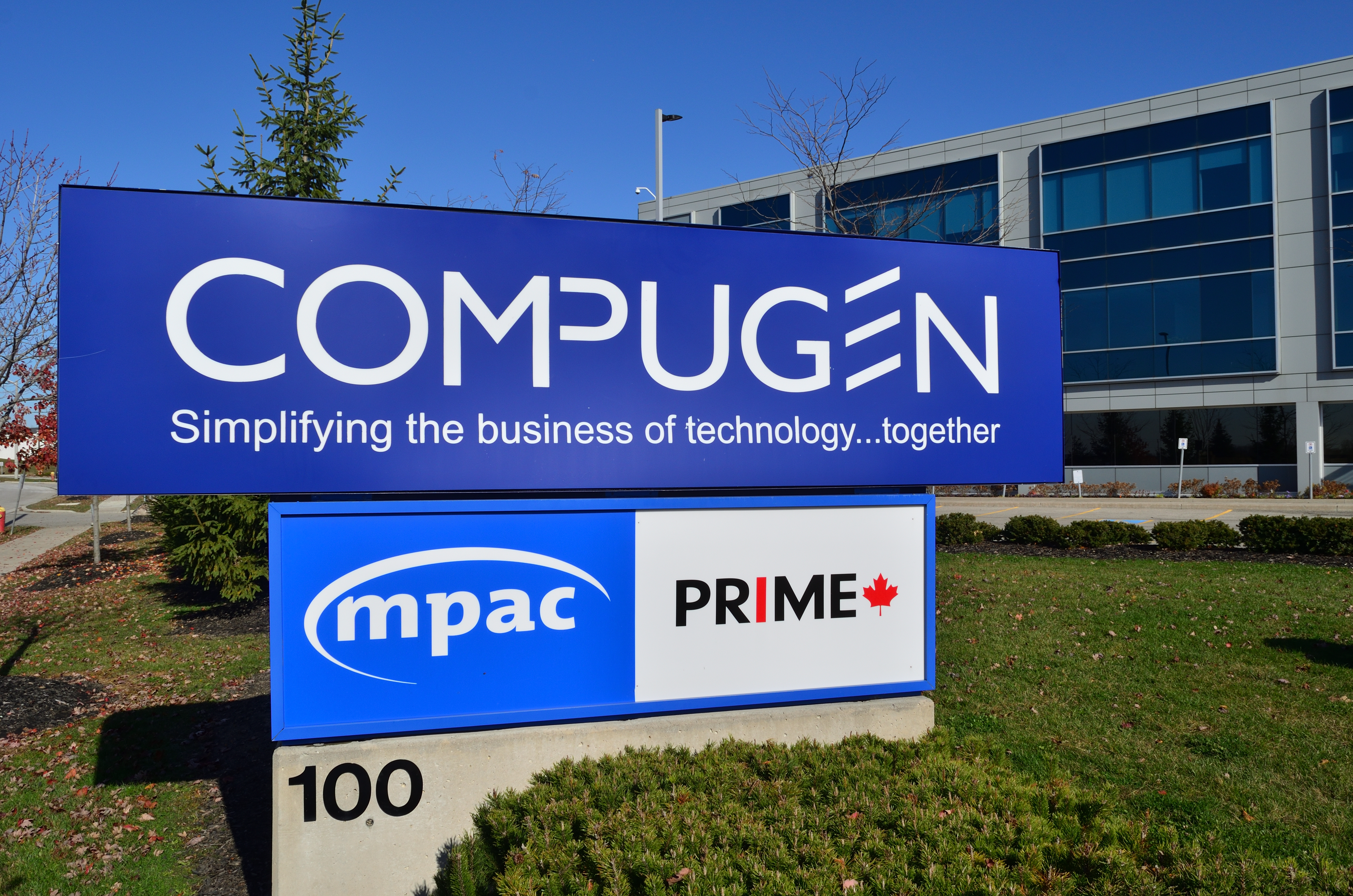
- Compugen head office in Richmond Hill
- Industry: Information Technology
- Founded: 1981
- Headquarters: Richmond Hill, Ontario
- Key people: Harry Zarek, CEO and president
- Services: Procurement, installation and consulting
- Number of employees: 1400+ (2020)
- Website: www.compugen.com www.itbuzz.ca

Compugen is a privately owned and operated information technology company headquartered in Richmond Hill, a suburb of Toronto, Ontario, Canada.

== History ==
Compugen was founded by Harry Zarek in Richmond Hill, Ontario, Canada. Harry initially developed an interest in personal computing while he was finishing his PhD in physics at the University of Toronto. In 1981, he started a business building computers in the garage of his Toronto home and Compugen (short for Computer Generation) was created. Compugen was initially authorized to sell PCs with Hewlett Packard in 1984.

In 1989, Compugen opened its first branch office in Ottawa, Ontario. In 2000, Telecom giant Norigen acquired a significant part of Compugen. In 2002, this portion of the business was reacquired by Mr. Zarek from Norigen. Compugen moved into its current Richmond Hill head office facility in 2010. In September of that year, Compugen merged assets with Canadian firm Metafore under the Compugen umbrella.

== Industry awards ==
- 2020 HPE Canada Solution Partner of the Year
- 2019 Cisco Architectural Excellence Award:Security
- 2019 Cisco Canada Social Impact Partner of the Year
- 2018 HPE Canadian Solution Partner of the Year
- 2018 Aruba Partner of the Year - Canada
