= Elliot Rodger =

British-American mass murderer (1991–2014)

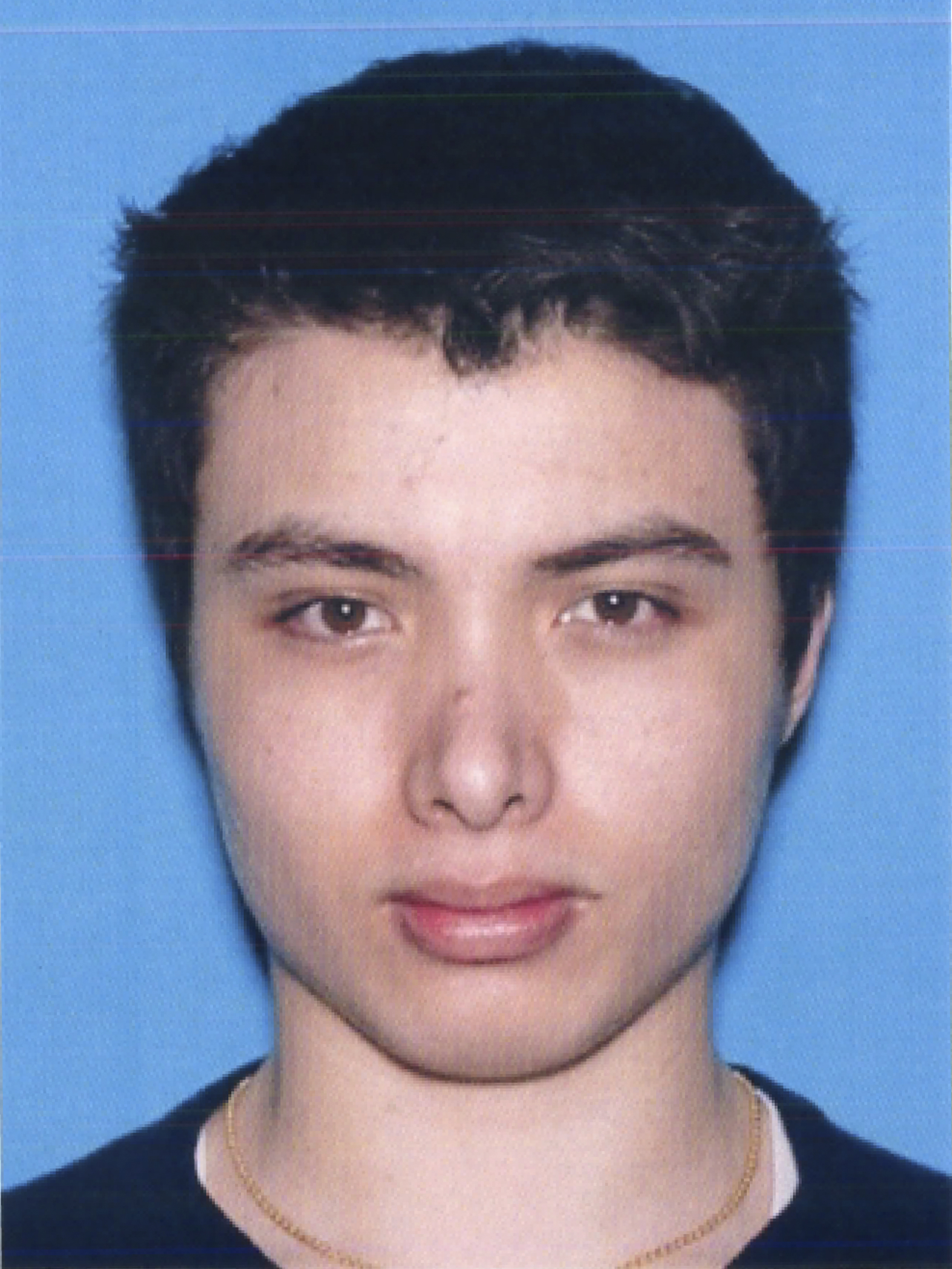
- Undated driver's license photo of Rodger
- Born: Elliot Oliver Robertson Rodger; July 24, 1991; London, England
- Died: May 23, 2014 (aged 22); Isla Vista, California, U.S.
- Cause of death: Suicide by gunshot
- Citizenship: United Kingdom; United States
- Education: Former student at Santa Barbara City College
- Known for: Perpetrator of the Isla Vista attacks
- Relatives: Peter Rodger (father); George Rodger (grandfather); Soumaya Akaaboune (stepmother)
- Motive: Revenge for perceived sexual and social rejection; Misogynist terrorism; Incel ideology

Details
- Date: May 23, 2014 ≈ 9:27 – 9:35 p.m.
- Targets: Students of Santa Barbara City College and the University of California, Santa Barbara, roommates
- Killed: 6 (3 by stabbing, 3 by gunfire)
- Injured: 14 (7 by gunfire, 7 by vehicle-ramming)
- Weapons: Six-inch "SRK" knife; Eight-inch hunting knife; Glock 34 Long Slide handgun (unused); Two SIG Sauer P226 handguns (only one used); 2008 BMW 328i Coupé

Elliot Oliver Robertson Rodger (July 24, 1991 – May 23, 2014) was a British-born American mass murderer who perpetrated the Isla Vista attacks, where he murdered six people and injured 14 others, before he fatally shot himself. The murders he committed, his suicide, and his manifesto have been named as early influences on the incel and manosphere subculture.

Born in London, Rodger relocated to California with his family as a child. The son of British filmmaker Peter Rodger, he grew up in a privileged household. Rodger struggled with social isolation, mental health issues, and rejection. As a teenager, he was diagnosed with pervasive developmental disorder not otherwise specified (PDD-NOS), but did not meet the criteria for an autism diagnosis. He started treatment and received special education resources and therapy for most of his life. He endured bullying during his time in middle and high school. Several incidents of Rodger's strange behavior during his time in Isla Vista, California, along with videos and other writings that mentioned violent intentions, worried his family and acquaintances.

On May 23, 2014, Rodger murdered six people and injured 14 others using knives, semi-automatic pistols, and his car as a weapon in Isla Vista near the University of California, Santa Barbara (UCSB). Rodger first killed his two roommates and their friend in the apartment they shared, ambushing and stabbing them one at a time as they arrived at different times. Hours later, he drove to the Alpha Phi sorority house, where he intended to murder its occupants but was unable to enter the premises. Rodger instead shot at three women from the Delta Delta Delta sorority who were walking near the Alpha Phi sorority house, killing two of them while critically injuring the third. He later drove by a nearby delicatessen, shooting and killing a man inside. Afterward, Rodger drove around Isla Vista, indiscriminately shooting and ramming pedestrians with his vehicle. He exchanged gunfire with sheriff's deputies twice, getting shot in his hip. Shortly after, he crashed his vehicle into a parked car. As police examined the vehicle, they found Rodger dead from a self-inflicted gunshot wound to his head.

Before starting the attacks, Rodger uploaded a video to YouTube, announcing his intention to "punish" women—as well as the men to whom they were attracted—for their lack of interest in him. He also e-mailed a 137-page manifesto—in which he described his major life events, personal struggles, and frustrations at having remained a lifelong virgin—to several of his family members, acquaintances, and therapists. In the years following his death, Rodger's attacks became a topic in conversations about mental health, online radicalization, and misogyny. He is cited as an early figure of the incel and manosphere subculture, being referred to as a "saint" in internet forums. Rodger's attacks have often been praised by incels around the world. He has both influenced and been referenced by perpetrators of other copycat killings, with some referring to their actions as "going E.R." Rodger's killings have sparked social media campaigns such as #NotAllMen and #YesAllWomen and have contributed to ongoing debates about toxic masculinity, gender-based violence, and the influence of internet forums in radicalizing young men who intend to commit copycat crimes.

== Early life ==
Elliot Oliver Robertson Rodger was born on July 24, 1991, in London, England, to Peter Rodger and Ong Li Chin. Peter, a British national, was a filmmaker who had directed television commercials. His mother is Malaysian Chinese and also worked in the film industry; after training in health care, she worked as an on-set nurse during production of The Princess Bride (1987) and Indiana Jones and the Last Crusade (1989). His paternal grandfather George Rodger was a photojournalist who was well known for his images of Bergen-Belsen concentration camp.

Following Rodger's birth, his family moved to Sussex, England, where he enjoyed a privileged childhood. Li Chin left her work in health care to take care of Rodger and soon bore a daughter. Rodger developed a close relationship with his maternal grandmother, who later moved in with his family. He initially attended Dorset House School, a private, all-boys school in West Sussex. When Rodger was five, due to his father's directing career, his family moved to Woodland Hills, an upscale neighborhood in Los Angeles.

Rodger's parents divorced when he was seven years old. Custody of Rodger was split between his parents' homes, and a year after their divorce, his father married Moroccan actress Soumaya Akaaboune. Rodger struggled with social interactions from an early age. In elementary school, he was withdrawn, whispered responses, and wrote answers instead of speaking. He avoided peers at recess and was overwhelmed by social gatherings. He also exhibited repetitive behaviors such as making noises and foot-tapping.

In 1999, Rodger's mother filed an affidavit asking for more child support from his father, labeling her son as a "high-functioning autistic child" with special needs. Rodger's father presented a diagnosis by a doctor, who stated the autism diagnosis was incorrect because the examiner might have missed conditions such as depression and anxiety. The doctor recommended an additional evaluation of Rodger by a child psychiatrist to obtain a correct diagnosis and appropriate treatment. Rodger had a difficult relationship with Akaaboune, whose parental authority he rejected in favor of that of his biological mother.

Growing older, Rodger wrote that he became self-conscious about his short height and slender frame; he briefly played basketball, believing it would make him grow taller. He also became embarrassed about his mixed-race heritage, which he felt set him apart from his entirely white peers. To blend in, Rodger stated that he dyed his hair blonde and began skateboarding, hoping these changes would help him befriend other children.

=== Middle and high school ===
Many of Rodger's social connections at school were initiated by his parents or other students, or facilitated by the parents of his peers, and he later wrote expressing anger when they stopped. He became known as a "quiet" and "weird kid" in middle school who intentionally annoyed classmates, leading to bullying by other students. He claimed one of his bullies was a blonde girl, which he stated contributed to the development of his misogynistic attitudes. Rodger's grades declined, his social activity decreased, and he immersed himself in video games such as World of Warcraft at his parents' houses and cybercafés. Akaaboune became concerned with his unwillingness to socialize and made him stop playing his video games, causing tensions between the two to escalate.

Upon reaching puberty, Rodger wrote that he developed a high sex drive but began to believe he would never have sexual relationships with women. Rodger wrote that he began masturbating regularly while viewing images of women online and fantasizing about sexual activity with them. He said that he did not know how to access pornography and instead browsed general websites. When he was 11, Rodger stated that a user on an AOL chatroom shared sexually explicit images of women with him, which, he wrote, left him shocked and overwhelmed with emotion. Two years later, while at an internet café, Rodger explained that he saw another teenager viewing pornography, which left him shaken and caused him to return home crying. During this time, his stepmother became pregnant and gave birth to a son.

After finishing middle school, Rodger attended Crespi Carmelite High School and later William Howard Taft Charter High School. During his time at both schools, he experienced severe bullying by other students, which contributed to anxiety and social withdrawal. During this period, Rodger spent increasing amounts of time playing video games, including World of Warcraft, mostly at home, and retreated more from in-person social interactions.

In 2007, Rodger was diagnosed with pervasive developmental disorder not otherwise specified (PDD-NOS), a diagnosis now grouped under autism spectrum disorder, which pertained to someone having difficulties in developing socially. While Rodger did not meet the criteria to be diagnosed with autism, his PDD-NOS diagnosis helped him receive special educational resources. At age 15, Rodger was prescribed Xanax and Prozac, but he stopped taking both medications after a year. He later began taking Paxil, but reported that it left him feeling excessively drowsy and fatigued. Rodger claimed he had to "rely entirely" on his "mind and positive thinking" to manage his social anxiety. His father's filmmaking career severely declined during the 2000s, culminating in the documentary film Oh My God (2009), which bombed at the box office. The film's failure drove Rodger's father into debt and forced him to pause his child support payments.

Rodger wrote that he harbored a fixation on becoming rich, believing it to be the key to gaining attention from women. He urged his mother to marry a wealthy man, but she refused. Rodger later pursued screenwriting and inventing as possible paths to success, but eventually abandoned these efforts. Disliking the milieu of standardized high schools, Rodger began attending classes regularly at Independence, a continuation high school, where he earned better grades, graduating in 2010.

== Later life ==
By age 18, Rodger had ceased his mental health treatment and was hesitant to take prescribed medication. Tensions continued to escalate between Rodger and his stepmother, and he was soon ejected from his father's house. Rodger enrolled at Los Angeles Pierce College, but dropped out shortly after.

Despite his mother's encouragement to seek employment, Rodger wrote that he spent his time frequently wandering around her house or reading at a bookstore, hoping to find friends. Later, he would sit alone in cafés, hoping for any woman to approach him. Rodger's parents worried about his direction in life and offered him help to find work, but Rodger deemed many jobs suggested to him to be "beneath him". His father referred him to his friend Karl Champley for construction work, where Rodger worked for some time.

Rodger soon enrolled at Moorpark College, attracted by its smaller size and appealing aesthetics. He stated that he was hopeful at the prospect of meeting blonde women and showing a potential girlfriend around his new campus. Rodger quickly experienced feelings of loneliness and unhappiness at Moorpark, and developed feelings of envy towards a couple in one of his classes. His discomfort was exacerbated by his social anxiety, particularly when he was called upon by a professor. Rodger dropped out of Moorpark after completing a year.

== Santa Barbara ==
Rodger's parents decided to send him to college in Santa Barbara and agreed to pay for his apartment and classes. He said that he agreed to the plan after watching the crime drama film Alpha Dog (2006), believing the move would change his social circumstances. On June 4, 2011, Rodger moved into the Capri Apartments in Isla Vista near the University of California, Santa Barbara (UCSB) campus and enrolled at Santa Barbara City College (SBCC).

Rodger found it difficult to form relationships with several roommates and chose to spend much of his time alone. When he shared an apartment with two Hispanic roommates, he would call them racial slurs and insist he was "superior". When his next roommate took his girlfriend to their apartment, Rodger began arguing with him, telling him he was "foolish" for being happy in a relationship with an "ugly whore". The roommate requested to be reassigned through the apartment management, stating that Rodger had "huge psychological issues", expressing that he was a "ticking time bomb waiting to explode", and that he was "at the point where I fear for my safety".

Rodger wrote that he soon began developing hostility toward the people in Isla Vista, viewing himself as deserving of relationships with attractive blonde women and resenting those he perceived as more socially successful. Rodger expressed that he started to have thoughts of killing women and couples, envisioning himself murdering couples when they were engaged in sexual activity. In July 2011, during a visit to a Starbucks coffee outlet, Rodger saw a couple kissing; he followed them outside and threw his coffee at them. The man yelled at Rodger, who fled the scene. That same month, Rodger noticed a couple kissing at a food court and later splashed them with iced tea. In January 2012, while driving past a bus stop, Rodger attempted to engage two blonde women by smiling; when they did not return the smile, he turned his car around and splashed them with his latté.

Rodger's father began working as a second unit director on The Hunger Games (2012). Rodger stated he soon developed an obsession with designer clothing, purchasing items in an attempt to elevate his status. By February 2012, Rodger withdrew from all of his classes at SBCC due to his frustration with his social interactions, particularly with women. He began to contemplate what he called a "Day of Retribution", a planned attack on women and couples. With these plans in mind, on March 11, 2012, Rodger traveled to attend a private Katy Perry concert, tickets for which his family were given by friends. The next day, Rodger went to the red-carpet premiere of The Hunger Games with his father and stepmother, where he met Jack Ross, the 16-year-old son of the film's director Gary Ross.

Rodger began to buy lottery tickets for the Mega Millions jackpot in June 2012, but he did not win. He began saving money for his planned attacks (eventually saving up to $5,000) to buy supplies, money he had saved from gifts from his grandparents and the $500 monthly allowance from his father. The following month, while walking alone in a park, he wrote that he saw college students playing kickball. Rodger stated he was overwhelmed with envy when seeing blonde women interacting with men; he purchased a Super Soaker and filled it with orange juice. He returned to the park, yelled at the students and sprayed them. In September 2012, after failing to win a $120 million Mega Millions jackpot, Rodger stated that he trashed his room and ended up spilling his wine on his laptop which permanently destroyed it. While traveling to Oxnard the following day to purchase a replacement, Rodger visited a shooting range to learn how to use a firearm.

Still hopeful of becoming rich, starting in November 2012, Rodger wrote that he drove on four separate occasions to Arizona over a six-month span to buy tickets for the Powerball jackpot, which had grown to $500 million. Rodger stated that he failed to win, further angering him. Thinking this meant he would remain a virgin, Rodger began to prepare for his "Day of Retribution", choosing the city of Isla Vista as his target. In December 2012, Rodger bought a Glock 34 Long Slide semi-automatic pistol for $755.57 at a firearms dealer in Goleta, California. He purchased another handgun, a SIG Sauer P226, in Burbank for $1,100 in March 2013. Rodger initially scheduled his attacks to take place around Halloween 2013, but realized the heightened police presence during the holiday would likely thwart his plans. He replanned his attacks for sometime in November 2013.

== Incident at house party ==
On July 20, 2013, Rodger was intent on losing his virginity days before his 22nd birthday; he drank vodka to ease his nerves and attended a house party. Upon entering, he wrote that he saw an Asian man speaking with a blonde woman and deliberately bumped into him while walking past. Frustrated by his inability to interact with women at the party, Rodger climbed a 10-foot (3.0 m) ledge and pretended to shoot people with his finger. He then insulted a group of women, and when he attempted to shove them off the ledge, a group of men pushed Rodger off, fracturing his ankle. He later went back to look for his sunglasses and entered the wrong house, where he was assaulted by the occupants, sustaining bruises and a swollen eye before returning to his apartment.

The following day, Rodger's father took his son to a hospital, where surgery was performed on his ankle. He helped his son file a police report, which caused two sheriff's deputies to attend the hospital to question Rodger. Rodger claimed that he was pushed off the ledge by four men after insulting one man's appearance. He stated that he then went to the front yard of another house and sat down on a chair, where he was approached by approximately 10 men who told him to leave. Rodger claimed he was grabbed by them and dragged to the house's driveway, where the men began hitting and calling him a homophobic slur; he remarked he struck one of them once before being further beaten. The police would classify it as a possible hate crime. When asked why he did not call the police, Rodger said he did not know whom to contact. A deputy remarked on Rodger's dishonesty, deeming him too timid to tell the truth. A man at the party confirmed that Rodger had instigated the incident, noting he acted strangely and did not talk to anyone. A neighbor also reported seeing Rodger returning home in tears, swearing to kill his assailants and contemplating suicide. The sheriff's office concluded Rodger was the instigator, and the investigation was closed without further action. Rodger was not arrested nor further interrogated.

=== Mental health and further planning ===
In August 2013, while recovering from ankle surgery, Rodger stayed with his mother and agreed to meet with a former childhood therapist. Fueled by resentment over the house party incident and his repeated rejections by women, Rodger concluded his only recourse was to enact his "Day of Retribution". Hindered by his fractured ankle, he again postponed his planned attacks until early 2014. Rodger's mother bought him a used 2008 black BMW 328i Coupé, giving him hope he might attract a girlfriend during the remainder of 2013.

Rodger's parents sought professional help for him, leading to therapy sessions with psychiatrist Charles Sophy, which began in late 2012 and ended by the fall of 2013. During his treatment with Sophy, he was prescribed the antipsychotic drug risperidone, which Rodger decided not to take after researching it online. Peter sought assistance from his friend Dale Launer, a filmmaker known for his work on relationship-themed films, in an effort to improve Rodger's interactions with women. Launer agreed to help and communicated with Rodger via email and in person; however, Launer's guidance was ineffective. Rodger's mother later enlisted the help of an agency that provided three counselors. Between May 2013 and May 2014, Rodger attended 29 sessions; he connected well with two male counselors but became jealous when they socialized with others. He formed a connection with a female counselor but was offended by the suggestion that he require paid female companionship, comparing it to being with a prostitute.

Rodger's parents also engaged a life coach named Gavin Linderman, who provided Rodger with instructions to improve his social life, requiring him to travel to Los Angeles for the sessions. During their meetings, Rodger told Linderman about his struggles with his virginity. Linderman suggested that moving away from Isla Vista might be beneficial for Rodger's mental health, but Rodger dismissed the idea. Li Chin later met separately with Linderman, a therapist, and the counseling director. After the meetings, she advised Rodger to temporarily leave Isla Vista and presented him with two options: either she would help him find a residential treatment center where he could get therapy every day, or he could move back home and receive intensive treatment from a therapist and social worker. Rodger responded by asking his mother to continue paying his rent, saying he had made new acquaintances, and promising to focus on his classes and meet with counselors. Because Rodger was now an adult, his mother could not legally force him to leave Isla Vista. After discussing with the therapists, his mother was told that she had done all she could and was advised to support her son's wish to stay and complete his education.

== Relationships and mindset ==
The following semester, Rodger enrolled in some classes but withdrew early. In September 2013, he was assigned a random apartment, where he gained two new roommates: 20-year-old Weihan "David" Wang and 20-year-old Cheng Yuan "James" Hong. Rodger remained socially isolated from the two and had little interaction with them.

In October 2013, Rodger's envy of his half-brother intensified after his stepmother told him that his half-brother had recently been signed by an agent for television commercials. Rodger wrote that he planned to murder his half-brother, expressing resentment and fearing he would be surpassed socially. He also planned to stab his stepmother in the neck, citing their strained relationship and stating that he believed she would interfere with his planned attacks. Rodger planned to commit the murders while his father was away on a business trip, as he was concerned he might hesitate if confronted with the task of killing his father as well.

According to Wang, Rodger was antisocial and largely withdrawn from him and Hong. Wang filed a complaint with the building's management stating that Rodger played loud music during the night. On January 15, 2014, a fight started after Rodger became irritated by Hong's cooking and took some of Hong's kitchen items. Hong responded by taking three of Rodger's candles, valued at $22, which Rodger reported stolen, and placed Hong under citizen's arrest. Police were called, and Hong was arrested for petty theft after he refused to return the candles. Officers located the candles in his bed.

Rodger later emailed the building manager, demanding that Hong and Wang be evicted from the apartment for the stolen candles. He also complained they were always too loud and constantly played video games. Hong and Wang were angered by Rodger's actions but refrained from confronting him, concerned it might worsen their living conditions. The parents of Hong and Wang grew concerned about their sons' living situation, but their sons reassured them that everything was fine. Hong and Wang distanced themselves from Rodger and signed a lease for a different apartment for the following semester. Rodger later wrote that he intended to murder both Hong and Wang, stating that he would have to eliminate them "to get them out of the way".

By January 2014, Rodger wrote that he had imagined launching his planned attacks during Valentine's Day or Deltopia, a spring break event in Isla Vista in early April, but dismissed those dates due to an anticipated heightened police presence and the additional time needed for preparation. Rodger eventually chose to mount his attacks on April 26.

In February 2014, Rodger bought a second SIG Sauer P226 handgun for $1,132 in Oxnard, in case either of his other two guns jammed. Throughout February and March of that year, Rodger visited gun ranges and made multiple ammunition purchases. On two separate occasions, Rodger visited the library at SBCC, where a librarian assisted him in locating books about serial killers and mass murderers.

== Online activity ==
Rodger maintained an active online presence across multiple social media platforms, where he posted photos and videos depicting an affluent lifestyle, such as attending high end plane rides and movie premieres. Rodger also conducted online searches related to mass violence, including Adolf Hitler, Joseph Goebbels, and Heinrich Himmler. He also searched celebrities, luxury automobiles, Nazism, knife attacks, and racially charged topics. He used search queries such as "Adolf Hitler and the law of attraction", "Nazi curbstomp", and "Holocaust of black people".

In the week before April 26, Rodger uploaded 22 YouTube videos. Some videos featured him expressing resentment toward women and frustration over staying a virgin, with titles such as "Why do girls hate me so much?", "Life is so unfair because girls don't want me", and "My reaction to seeing a young couple at the beach, Envy". Additional YouTube videos show Rodger recording himself driving around Southern California in his BMW while listening to music by artists such as Whitney Houston, George Michael, and Phil Collins. He subscribed to multiple YouTube channels associated with the men's rights movement that posted content advising men on attracting and talking with women. Rodger had a second YouTube channel named "Valtharion", where he would leave negative comments on some videos, calling women derogatory terms and accusing other men of lying about their relationships with women. He also boasted about his affluent family background and expressed racist viewpoints.

Rodger posted his videos and grievances on forums such as Bodybuilding.com; while some users mocked him as desperate and insecure, Rodger rejected help and advice offered by others. He was active on online forums associated with the manosphere, including ForeverAlone and PUAHate, where users identified themselves as "incels" (involuntary celibates) and discussed social rejection and resentment of women. Along with such comments expressing racist and misogynistic views, Rodger posts showed resentment of interracial relationships.

When Rodger told his father about the forums, his father confronted him, warning him that the content was negative and inappropriate and that he should not visit them. Rodger also informed his mother about the forums, though she did not give them much attention. Rodger later claimed that he sent his parents a link to PUAhate, though neither of them reviewed the forum's posts. A friend of Rodger later noticed his behavior on social media and reached out to Li Chin, who told him that Rodger was already receiving treatment.

== Month before attacks ==
=== Police welfare check ===
In April 2014, Rodger continued his preparations by visiting two additional gun ranges. After posting videos to his YouTube channel in the week leading up to April 26, Rodger planned to finish writing his manifesto and upload a final video minutes before starting his attacks. On April 24, Rodger became sick with a cold and his father returned early from his business trip, causing Rodger to question whether these events were a sign to abandon his plans. He postponed the date of his planned attacks to May 24 to allow recovery from his cold and more time to live.

On April 30, 2014, Rodger's mother became worried after she had failed to contact him for several days. Li Chin searched for Rodger online and found videos he had posted on YouTube. Becoming disturbed by the content, she tried calling her son again, but he did not answer. She then contacted Linderman and told him what she found. Linderman contacted a crisis hotline and spoke with a staff member, voicing concerns about Rodger mentioning self-harm, causing the staff member to request a welfare check on Rodger. Responding to the request, four sheriff's deputies, a university police officer, and a dispatcher-in-training visited Rodger's apartment.

When the police arrived at Rodger's apartment, he said the videos were his way of expressing his social difficulties in Isla Vista and that he had no intention of hurting anyone or himself. A deputy asked Rodger to call his mother to update her on his situation. He did so, told her he was fine, and handed his phone to one of the deputies. The deputy asked his mother if the videos caused her concern about Rodger harming himself or others. After she said she was not concerned, the deputies handed Rodger back his phone, and he told his mother he would call her later. Because they did not enter Rodger's apartment, watch his videos, or check whether he owned any weapons, they determined he did not pose an immediate risk to himself or others. The deputies determined Rodger did not meet the criteria for an involuntary hold and provided him with information on local support services.

Rodger was relieved after the police officers left because a search of his apartment would have uncovered his firearms and manifesto, and thwarted his attacks. After the police left, Rodger removed most videos from YouTube. The following day, Rodger's mother contacted the counseling office at SBCC but was unable to reach anyone. Rodger planned to repost the videos in the days leading up to his attacks in May. He took Xanax during this period.

=== Final planning and manifesto ===
Rodger created a 137-page manifesto entitled My Twisted World: The Story of Elliot Rodger. In the manifesto, Rodger describes his life and frustrations in staying a virgin. He described women as a "plague" and said their right to choose their own partners could "hinder the advancement of humanity"; and that "civilized men of intelligence" should choose women's sexual partners. He also stated women should not be given any rights, and that their "wickedness" needed to be "contained" to avoid the risk of humanity "falling into degeneracy". Rodger said women's refusal to accept him was a "declaration of war" and hoped his attacks would reshape humanity. According to Rodger, to "purify the world", it is necessary to remove love and sex from human existence. He imagined himself as a leader with "fanatically loyal troops" who imprison women in concentration camps, and the few left alive would be kept in "secret labs" and be "artificially inseminated" with sperm samples to become pregnant, ensuring men would be unaware of women's existence.

Rodger detailed his plan for his "Day of Retribution" and divided it into three phases. The day before starting his proposed phases, Rodger planned to drive to his father's house to kill his stepmother and half-brother. He would then steal their Mercedes SUV and drive it to Isla Vista. Rodger's first phase involved killing his two roommates and then luring victims into his apartment, slowly torturing them before killing them. In the second phase, which he dubbed the "War on Women", he aimed to target "the very girls who represent everything I hate in the female gender", specifically focusing on the Alpha Phi sorority house with the intent to kill as many occupants as possible before setting fire to the building. In his final phase, after setting the sorority house on fire, he would proceed to shoot and run over as many people in Isla Vista as possible with his parents' SUV.

Rodger showed a section of his manifesto describing his childhood in England to his mother, who was impressed and encouraged him to continue writing. Rodger's father knew he had been writing something, but Rodger refused to show it to him. During a hike together, Rodger's father expressed interest in his son's writing and asked to see it. Rodger declined the request, assuring his father he would share it with him soon.

=== Encounters before attacks ===
Throughout May 2014, Rodger drove throughout Santa Barbara and Montecito during the weeks leading up to the attacks. On May 6, Rodger was involved in an altercation with a couple in a parking lot in Goleta Beach. When a man attempted to reverse out of a parking spot, Rodger blocked his exit with his car. Rodger told the man: "You're lucky to be an Asian guy dating a white girl. It's too bad she is such a horsefaced slut". The man's female partner, who was in a separate car in the same parking lot, witnessed the fight. After Rodger drove away within the parking lot, the man told his partner of the encounter. The woman then attempted to follow Rodger in her car within the lot. After a brief encounter, during which Rodger did not respond, she left feeling disturbed and observed him speeding through the parking lot, nearly striking other vehicles. The woman called the police and informed them of Rodger's BMW.

A week before his attacks, Rodger met his mother and sister for dinner at a restaurant in Montecito. During their meal, he saw a couple and quietly told his mother the man was too unattractive to be dating a blonde woman. Rodger's mother ignored his remark and shifted the conversation, feeling relieved to see her son again after April 30. Rodger's sister commented that he was eating more than usual, which made him scoff at her. Once they finished eating, they went their separate ways. On May 18, a Bodybuilding.com user noticed that Rodger had removed the "Why do girls hate me so much?" video, commenting that his romantic failures were likely due to "the creepy vibe that you give off" and sounding like a serial killer. Rodger replied that his parents had forced him to take the videos down, but planned to repost them. He later gave the same response in the description of one of his remaining videos, saying the videos concerned some of his family members and that he would repost them later.

On May 20, one of Rodger's videos was posted on Reddit's "r/cringe" subreddit, where users discussed Rodger's mental health and debated calling the police, with some making fun of Rodger and saying it was a fake, while another user compared him to the fictional serial killer Patrick Bateman from the film American Psycho (2000). On May 21, after being called a "low-class incel" on PUAHate, Rodger linked a video of himself, his father, and stepmother at The Hunger Games premiere, saying: "You're all jealous of my 10/10 pretty-boy face. This site is full of stupid, disgusting, mentally ill degenerates who take pleasure in putting down others. That is all I have to say on here. Goodbye." On May 22, Rodger accessed and viewed PUAHate and Bodybuilding.com before discovering and viewing anxietyzone.com. That same day, Rodger reposted a number of his videos on YouTube, including the "Why do girls hate me so much?" video.

== Attacks ==
Despite initially selecting May 24 as the date for his attacks, Rodger decided to initiate his attacks a day earlier. He told his mother his final day of school would be on May 23, that he would be taking a test at SBCC, and that he would call her after he finished the test. Rodger visited Giovanni's Pizza, where he stood silently on the patio, holding his phone. A female staff member claimed that she approached and asked if he needed assistance, but Rodger remained silent, only smiling at her.

=== Apartment stabbings ===
Before starting his attacks, Rodger took Xanax. He looked up pornography online and searched the terms "quiet silent kill with a knife" and "how to kill someone with a knife" before practicing stabbing on his bed sheets and pillows. Rodger armed himself with a six-inch "SRK" knife and eight-inch hunting knife. Rodger ambushed and fatally stabbed his first victim when his roommate Wang returned to the apartment. Wang suffered 15 stab wounds while attempting to defend himself, after which Rodger moved Wang's body to Wang and Hong's shared bedroom and attempted to conceal it. Rodger then ambushed and fatally stabbed Hong when he entered afterward; Hong sustained 25 stab wounds while attempting to defend himself. Rodger also moved Hong's body to the same shared bedroom and tried to conceal it. Later, 19-year-old George Chen, a friend of Hong and Wang who had come to visit them, entered the apartment and was ambushed and stabbed as Chen attempted to defend himself. Chen sustained 94 stab wounds. His body was left in a bathroom. After each stabbing, Rodger tried to clean the apartment, which was covered in blood, and hide evidence before each victim's arrival by using bathroom towels and paper towels, which became soaked in blood.

=== Preparation for shootings ===
Rodger changed out of his blood-soaked clothes, wrapped them in his bedsheets, and showered. At around 7:30 p.m., Rodger made a purchase at Starbucks and texted his mother saying he would call her later. He then returned to his apartment and wrote in his journal:

I had to tear some pages out because I feared my intentions would be discovered. I taped them back together as fast as I could. This is it. In one hour I will have my revenge on this cruel world. I HATE YOU ALLLL! DIE.

Minutes before starting his planned shooting attacks, he emailed his manifesto to 34 people, reposted several more videos which he previously deleted, and uploaded a seven-minute video called "Elliot Rodger's Retribution" to YouTube. In the video, Rodger repeated grievances about his life and described his intention to "punish" women and sexually active men.

=== Shootings and car attacks ===
At around 9:15 p.m., Rodger drove to the Alpha Phi sorority house. After failing to enter, at 9:27 p.m., he noticed three women, members of the Delta Delta Delta sorority, walking around the Alpha Phi sorority house. Rodger pulled up to them in his car and opened fire, killing 19-year-old Veronika Weiss and 22-year-old Katherine "Katie" Cooper while severely wounding the third woman. Weiss suffered seven gunshot wounds while Cooper sustained eight. Rodger then drove past a deli, shooting inside and killing 20-year-old Christopher Michaels-Martinez with a single gunshot wound to the chest. While driving further through Isla Vista, Rodger shot seven people and wounded seven others with his BMW by striking them. He exchanged gunfire with police twice and was shot in the hip. He then crashed his BMW into a parked car and was found dead by police from a self-inflicted gunshot wound to the head at 9:35 p.m.

=== Vehicle search ===
After searching Rodger's car, police found a Glock 34 Long Slide handgun with seven loaded, 10-round magazines; two SIG Sauer P226 handguns with 34 loaded, 10-round magazines; over 500 rounds of live ammunition; and two knives he used to kill his two roommates and their friend. The shootings lasted eight minutes, during which Rodger discharged approximately 55 9mm rounds. Rodger used only one of the Sig Sauer P226 pistols which was later found on the driver's seat of his BMW. The other two handguns had not been fired.

=== Victims killed ===
During his attacks, Rodger murdered six people, two women and four men, all of whom were UCSB students, with 14 others sustaining injuries, seven by gunfire and seven who were hit by Rodger's vehicle.

- Weihan "David" Wang, July 6, 1993 – May 23, 2014 (aged 20), sophomore majoring in computer engineering
- Cheng Yuan "James" Hong, April 15, 1994 – May 23, 2014 (aged 20), sophomore majoring in computer engineering
- George Chen, September 19, 1994 – May 23, 2014 (aged 19), sophomore majoring in computer science
- Veronika Elizabeth Weiss, February 24, 1995 – May 23, 2014 (aged 19), freshman and member of the Delta Delta Delta sorority majoring in financial mathematics and statistics
- Katherine "Katie" Breann Cooper, December 26, 1991 – May 23, 2014 (aged 22), senior and member of the Delta Delta Delta sorority double majoring in art history and classics and archeology
- Christopher Ross Michaels-Martinez, December 23, 1993 – May 23, 2014 (aged 20), sophomore majoring in English

== Aftermath ==
Following the attacks, police and the Bureau of Alcohol, Tobacco, Firearms and Explosives (BATFE) conducted search warrants at the homes of Rodger's parents, first at his father's home in Woodland Hills and then at his mother's house in West Hills. Several memorials were held for the victims. In early June 2014, Rodger's father met with Richard Martinez, the father of Michaels-Martinez, to talk about Michaels-Martinez's life and death. In an interview later that month, Peter told journalist Barbara Walters that although Rodger had a long history of social problems and had gone through years of therapy, he did not believe his son was capable of murder. He stated that his son was good at hiding his true emotions and described him as an "incredible liar", expressing remorse to the deceased victim's parents.

The parents of Hong, Wang, and Chen filed a wrongful death lawsuit in federal court against Santa Barbara County, the Sheriff's department, Capri Apartments. They received a settlement for $20 million from Capri Apartments. Rodger's attacks renewed calls for gun control and improvements in the American healthcare system. In response, Santa Barbara Assembly members Das Williams and Nancy Skinner introduced legislation that would allow law enforcement, close relatives, or roommates to request a court order for the confiscation of firearms from individuals deemed a danger. Governor Jerry Brown signed the red flag law in September 2014. California became the first state to enact a red flag law that allows close relatives and friends to petition courts to remove weapons from persons deemed a danger to others. The attacks also sparked discussions of violence against women and misogyny. The International Centre for Counter-Terrorism at the Hague classified Rodger's attacks as misogynist terrorism, while The US Secret Service described it as "misogynistic extremism".

Following the killings carried out by Rodger, users on social media and the comments on his YouTube videos expressed sympathy for his perceived grievances, some suggesting that his perceived rejection by women justified violence. A Facebook page titled "Elliot Rodger Is an American Hero" and other fan pages were later created, sharing his videos and hosting commentary supportive of his actions. After Rodger's attacks, social media users used the hashtag #NotAllMen to emphasize that most men do not share similar thoughts of violence. The hashtag #YesAllWomen was used approximately 1.2 million times on Twitter, surpassing earlier hashtags that highlighted sexism and violence against women.

Some members of the incel community have portrayed Rodger in explicitly celebratory terms. Posts in these communities have included tribute songs, merchandise featuring his image, and memes depicting him in quasi-religious imagery. Some users refer to him as a "saint" and mark the anniversary of the killings as "Saint Elliot Day". Within these forums, his name was often abbreviated as "E.R." and his attacks have been cited as an inspiration by individuals involved in or suspected of other acts of mass violence, sometimes described as "going E.R."

== See also ==
- Misogynist terrorism
- Gun laws in California
- List of rampage killers in the United States
