= Hunt family murders =

2024 killings in Bushey, England

- Location: 51.653220°N 0.378037°W; Bushey, Hertfordshire, England
- Date: 9 July 2024; 2 years ago c. 14:32 – 18:54 (BST, UTC+01:00)
- Attack type: Stabbing, shooting, femicide, home invasion, rape
- Weapons: Hori-Zone Kornet MXT-405 compound crossbow; butcher knife
- Deaths: 3
- Injuries: 1 (the perpetrator)
- Victims: Carol Hunt; Hannah Hunt; Louise Hunt
- Perpetrator: Kyle Marcus Clifford
- Verdict: Guilty
- Convictions: Possession of an offensive weapon (2 counts); False imprisonment; Rape; Murder (3 counts)
- Sentence: Life imprisonment (whole life order)

On 9 July 2024, three members of the Hunt family—Carol Hunt and two of her daughters, Hannah and Louise Hunt—were killed in their home in Bushey, Hertfordshire, by Louise's ex-boyfriend Kyle Clifford. The subsequent manhunt lasted until the next day, ending when Clifford was found injured near his home in the London Borough of Enfield. For the murders, Clifford was given a whole-life sentence on 11 March 2025.

== Events ==
=== Murders ===
Louise Hunt had broken up with Kyle Clifford on 26 June 2024, due to his views and behaviour. To Hunt, Clifford appeared to accept this. Over the next few days, however, he purchased a Hori-Zone Kornet MXT-405 compound crossbow and six bolts, a butcher knife, and a CO2 Glock air pistol (which was not delivered to him in time for the attacks), as well as large quantities of petrol, duct tape and rope.

Clifford parked on a street near Hunt's home at 19 Ashlyn Close in Bushey, near Watford, by 13:40 BST on 9 July 2024. He left the car to check which vehicles were in the Hunts' driveway, before returning to his vehicle, where he searched online for horse racing events to determine if Hunt's father John, a racing commentator, would be at home. Clifford approached the Hunts' house with his knife concealed in a rucksack and rang the doorbell at 14:32. At the door, he was met by Louise's mother, Carol Hunt. Clifford told Carol that he was returning some of Louise's belongings before stabbing her to death once he was let in. The discussion on the doorstep was captured by the Hunts' doorbell camera, which also captured sound from the house throughout the day. Clifford likely waited for Carol to die of her wounds before he left the property at 15:07, returning to his car and retrieving the crossbow, which he took to the house concealed under a blanket.

Louise was working at her dog grooming business in an outbuilding of the property, with customers coming and going during the afternoon through a side gate. Clifford waited for Louise to enter the house, which she did at 16:11. Shortly afterwards, she was heard screaming. Further sounds described as high-pitched screaming, a male shouting, and banging noises were heard until 16:26. Clifford then restrained Louise by the wrists and ankles and gagged her. For several hours, Clifford harmed and raped Louise. At 17:31, Clifford went to the outbuilding to take Louise's phone. He used it to ask John when he would return home, and then searched online if unplugging a smoke detector fully disconnected it, as he was allegedly planning to burn down the house. He left the property and went to the back garden, returning to the house at 18:20, at which point he closed the patio blinds. At 18:49, Hannah Hunt, Louise's older sister, called Carol's phone as she was approaching the property. One minute later, Clifford fatally shot Louise through the back with the crossbow.

Hannah entered the property mere seconds later and called out to her mother, asking why she had not answered the phone, before going upstairs. Shortly afterwards, Hannah saw Clifford and began shouting at him; Clifford tried to calm her down before Hannah began crying and screaming. At 18:52, Hannah messaged her boyfriend, Alex Klein, asking him to call the police and telling him that Clifford was tying her up before her phone was set to silent. Clifford then shot Hannah with the crossbow at 18:54. He left the house immediately afterward, with the crossbow again concealed under the blanket. Based on audio recordings, Hannah likely discovered the bodies of her mother and sister at 18:57, after she had been shot and wounded by Clifford.

Hannah had called 999 possibly before Clifford fled. Armed police were sent to the house just before 19:00, with ambulance staff in attendance. Hannah was still alive when the first responders arrived, but was soon pronounced dead at the scene.

=== Manhunt ===
The police appealed for the public's help in locating Clifford, warning that he was considered armed and dangerous and to call 999 rather than approach him. After leaving the Hunts' home, Clifford began driving towards his own house. He stopped at a lay-by in Ferny Hill, before parking up at Cook's Hole Road at 19:32 and going into nearby Lavender Hill Cemetery. He spent the night there, at some point creating a noose from rope and a tree branch; the weakness of both rope and branch meant "any attempt at suicide by hanging would have been improbable."

Following a 22-hour manhunt mostly in the London Borough of Enfield, police found Clifford injured in the cemetery near his home in Enfield at around 18:00 on 10 July 2024. He shot himself in the chest when he saw armed police and a police dog approaching. Police recovered the crossbow and Clifford was initially treated for his injuries at the cemetery before being taken to the Royal London Hospital.

== Victims ==
The victims were Carol Hunt, aged 61, and two of her daughters: Hannah Hunt, aged 28, and Louise Hunt, aged 25. Hannah was a beautician and Louise was a dog groomer. The women are survived by BBC racing commentator John Hunt, Carol's husband and father to Hannah and Louise, and Amy, Carol and John's other daughter. The police had no previous contact with the family.

According to information given in the coroner's inquest, Carol died from stab wounds, while Hannah and Louise died from being shot with a crossbow. Hannah was still alive, found in the main doorway, when the police arrived at the address.

== Perpetrator ==
Kyle Marcus Clifford (born 5 April 1998) was 26 years old at the time of the murders. He is a former security guard and soldier who briefly served in the Queen's Dragoon Guards. After being found on 10 July, he was taken to a nearby hospital and was treated for serious injuries; the police confirmed that no shots had been fired when they apprehended him. It was later confirmed that Clifford's injuries were self-inflicted, and that he had undergone surgery for a chest wound. He was kept under police guard at hospital but was unfit to be arrested due to his injuries. Clifford had shot himself in the chest with the crossbow, paralysing himself from the waist down.

Clifford's brother Bradley is also a convicted murderer, having been sentenced at the Old Bailey in 2018 and still in prison at the time of the Hunts' murders. Police searched a property relating to Bradley as well as Clifford's home.

=== Trial ===
Clifford was arrested on the evening of 11 July, on suspicion of three counts of murder, but remained in hospital unable to be questioned because of his injuries. On 17 September 2024 he was charged with the murders of the women, appearing remotely at Westminster Magistrates' Court. He was also charged with the false imprisonment of Louise Hunt, and with two counts of possessing an offensive weapon. On 19 December 2024 Clifford appeared remotely at Cambridge Crown Court where he pleaded not guilty to the three counts of murder, as well as the charges of false imprisonment and of possessing an offensive weapon. He was also charged with one count of rape. Prosecutors said Clifford's actions were fuelled by the "violent misogyny promoted" by controversial social media personality Andrew Tate.

On 22 January 2025, he changed his pleas to guilty for all three charges of murder, the charges of false imprisonment and of possessing an offensive weapon. He pleaded not-guilty to the charge of raping Louise Hunt, with his defence arguing that the forensic evidence of sexual contact can be explained by the couple having consensual sex on 23 June 2024. The prosecution said this theory was "untenable". Clifford was found guilty of the rape charge, and on 11 March 2025 he was sentenced to life imprisonment without parole, a whole-life sentence.

Despite Clifford not attending court for sentencing, Judge Joel Bennathan delivered sentencing remarks. He said that Carol Hunt had shown Clifford "nothing but kindness" in the moments before he attacked her; that Louise Hunt had been "as gentle as she could" ending their relationship; and that Hannah Hunt had done nothing to Clifford "save supporting her little sister". For these reasons, and also referring to letters Clifford wrote before the attack, Bennathan described Clifford as "a jealous man, soaked in self-pity; a man who holds women in utter contempt".

== Response ==
A vigil was held in Bushey for the victims. The triple killings were heavily reported on and considered incredibly shocking. In the days following there was support shown to John Hunt in various forms. The Professional Jockey Association confirmed that jockeys would wear black armbands and observe moments of silence at upcoming races, while Mark Chapman spoke in support of Hunt in his UEFA Euro 2024 semi-final broadcast ahead of England defeating the Netherlands. After the match, other football personalities directed attention back to the Hunts.

In February 2024, the Home Office reviewed evidence to see if there was a need to legislate to restrict the ownership of crossbows as they had been used in several attacks. A new government took office in July 2024, with the Home Office announcing that home secretary Yvette Cooper would look at the findings of the earlier review. Then-prime minister Keir Starmer described the killings as "awful" and pledged that the government would look at crossbow legislation in response.

== See also ==
- Otley Run pub crawl attack
- Laws on crossbows § United Kingdom
- List of prisoners with whole life orders
