= Otley Run =

Pub crawl in Leeds, England

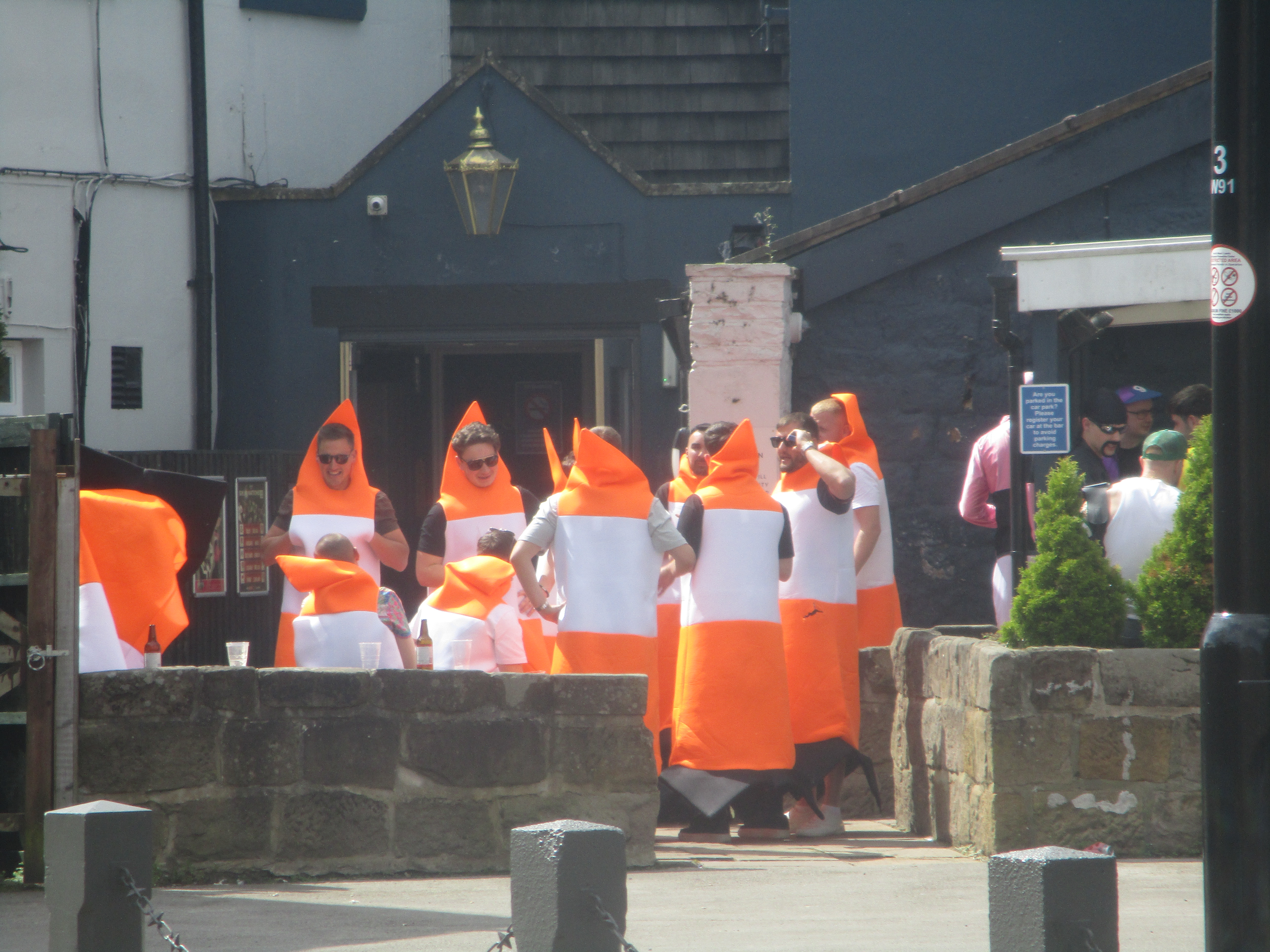
Revellers on the Otley Run in 2024

The Otley Run is a pub crawl in Leeds, West Yorkshire, England. The popular route covers Far Headingley, Headingley and Hyde Park areas and commonly continues towards Leeds City Centre.

The Otley Run is seen as a rite of passage for students studying at Leeds' universities and its modern route features in a London Underground style pub map of Leeds created by former graphic design student Steve Lovell. Participants now often wear fancy dress, coordinating their costumes to a particular theme.

As ad-hoc informal events, Otley Runs operate without co-ordinated management, although there is advice for student societies from their Universities which requires risk assessments and an agreed code of conduct. A Public Spaces Protection Order applies generally with enforcement by police and council anti-social behaviour officers, and an Otley Run Problem Solving Group exists to address related local concerns.

Following the Otley Run pub crawl attack in which two women taking part in the event were shot with a crossbow, Headingley Labour councillor Jonathan Pryor acknowledged that related safety management "needs looking at".

== Popularity and participation ==
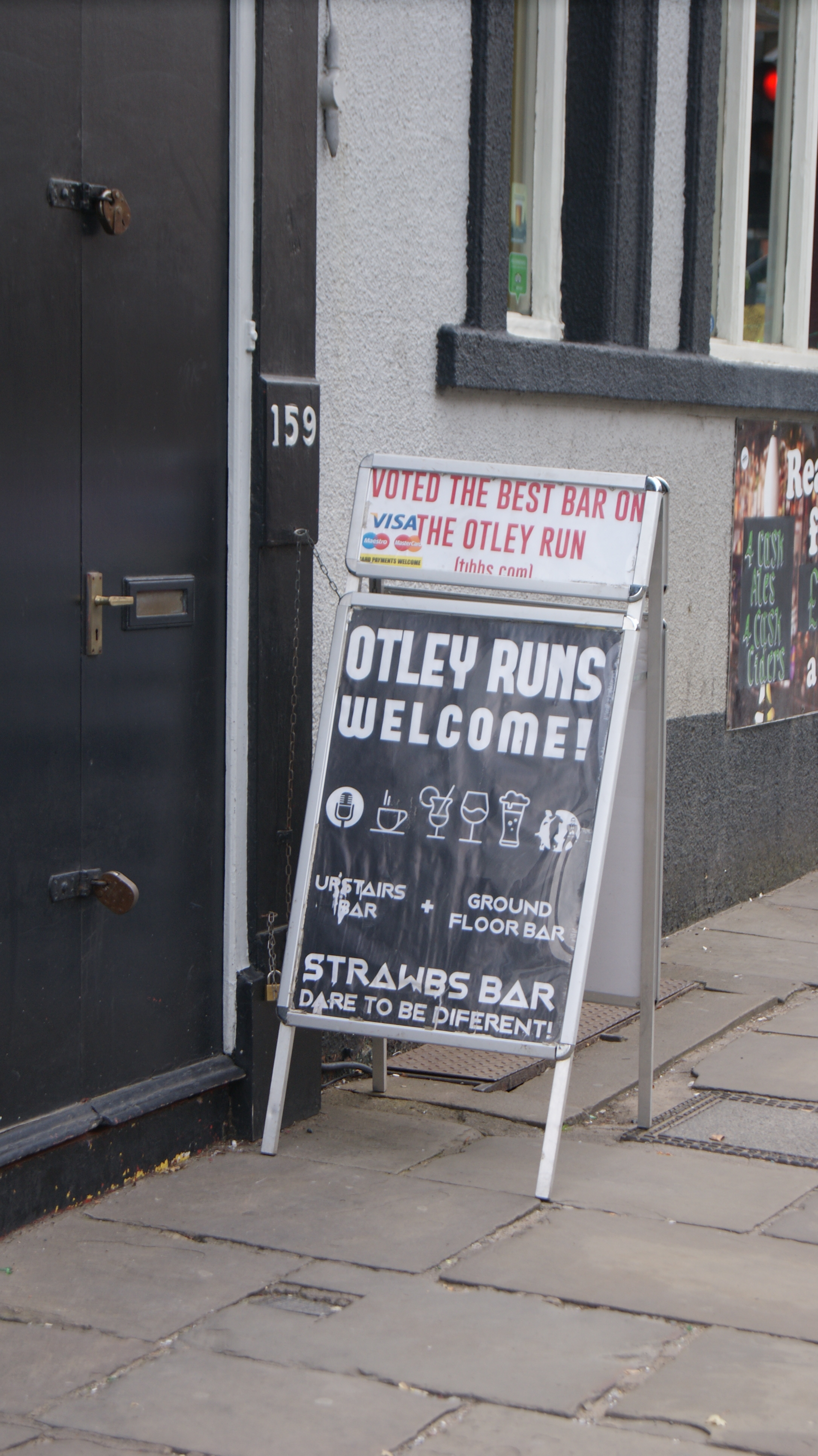
A sign outside Strawbs Bar on Woodhouse Lane welcoming Otley Run revellers.

As a recurring event in Freshers' Week, Otley Road pub crawls serve to introduce incoming students at The University of Leeds and Leeds Beckett University (originally Leeds Polytechnic) to Leeds' student residences and campus locations. These are also a popular social gathering for student clubs and societies throughout the year and have been adopted by Leeds College of Music, Leeds Arts University, and Leeds Trinity University.

Otley Run participants also include members of The University of Bradford Hockey Club and students of the Grammar School at Leeds, Lawnswood School, Roundhay School, Notre Dame Catholic Sixth Form College, Guiseley School, Horsforth School, St Mary's, Menston and Abbey Grange Church of England Academy do the Otley Run on their last day, as well as students from Otley's Prince Henry's Grammar School Sixth Form, with their run usually including various pubs and bars around Otley as well as the Headingley Mile venues.

The enduring popularity of the Otley Run has seen it become a common activity for birthdays and other celebrations among graduates, city residents, and visiting parties. Themed charity events organised by Leeds Rag have led to fancy dress as a common theme, and in 2010 a five-minute segment in Oz and Hugh's Raise the Bar featured the presenters dressing up to take part.

The Otley Run has inspired beer bottle designs, poetry and a verse novella, and artwork depicting the venues and scenery on the route. In 2019, the Leeds HSBC's "Global Citizen" campaign mentioned the Otley Run by name on billboards across Leeds.

== History of the route ==
Influences on the Otley Run's name and route over time include:

- A long-standing tradition of social drinking after lectures among students of the University of Leeds, with some heading north toward Devonshire Hall's JCR and halls with similar common room facilities such as Bodington Hall.
- An occasional "Otley Run" event in Otley, for which a general order of exemption to provisions of the Licensing Act 1964 meant pubs could open from 10am to 4pm on Mondays and Fridays when livestock markets opened. In the case of the Red Lion this was indicated by a licensing law sign beside the front door.
- Wide availability of Tetley's cask bitter in both Otley Road pubs (resulting from the brewery's rapid post-war expansion having included takeovers of inns and brewhouses on Otley Road) and in students' unions (until an NUS Services decision halted sales in 1993).
- Students being able to include bars and events on University of Leeds and Leeds Polytechnic union premises (which until The Licensing Act 2003 removed the private club exemption for alcohol sales were members' clubs and required membership cards to enter), and a similar bar at Bodington Hall. Events included a Wednesday Bop night set up specifically to attract sports clubs and their opponents after matches.
- Proximity of The Stables (at Weetwood Hall) to Bodington playing fields [for sports societies], of the Three Horseshoes and New Inn (central Headingley) to Beckett's Park, of Woodhouse Lane pubs to various University of Leeds departments, and of The Cobourg/Pig and Whistle (Claypit Lane and Merrion Centre) to the Polytechnic civic centre campus.
- Changes in permissible afternoon and evening opening hours encouraging new bars to open around North Lane/central Headingley and enhancing the appeal of bars and clubs at the city centre end of the main road
- Advice from letting agents seeking to attract students with written articles about the local area, from hen/stag party planners and fancy dress shops advising customers on which pubs to visit, and further commercial interest from pubs and associated discount card providers looking to get their associated venues "on the route". Viral marketing campaigns involving Twitter feeds and web sites were employed, each claiming to be official sources of information.

Prior to the Licensing Act 1988, UK pubs were required to close in the afternoon. For Leeds, Otley's status as a thriving market town having given it exemption from this law made it popular with afternoon drinkers in general. For students, Otley Road pub crawls might run to or from University Union premises and include (or stop at) residential cafeteria facilities and nearby Tetley pubs or the Bodington Hall on-site bar.

When the UK government introduced student loans to support rapid increases in availability of University places in 1990, demand for places in halls of residence followed and spilled over to demand on local houses in nearby Woodhouse, Hyde Park, and Headingley/Far Headingley areas. With longer opening hours being adopted by pubs at the time, the common Otley Run route became one that visited these areas in particular. Starting around the ring road junction was popular with student sports societies thanks to Bodington's playing fields, Sports Park Weetwood, and location of The Stables (at University-owned Weetwood Hall). Similarly, Woodhouse Lane and Albion Street bars or city centre clubs offered end points for south-bound runs should drinkers not qualify as members or guests as required for access to student union bars. This journey would therefore pass or approach such sites as the University playing fields at Bodington Hall/Weetwood Pavilion, as well as Carnegie stadium, Castle Grove Masonic Lodge, Associated Tower Cinemas' famous Lounge and Cottage Road cinemas, the site of the Skyrack Wapentake Shire Oak (now commemorated with a blue plaque at the Original Oak), Woodhouse Ridge, the site of Leeds Girls' High School, and Woodhouse Moor/Hyde Park.

As Headingley's student population subsequently grew, more, larger, and longer-opening pubs arrived in the area and were added to Otley Road crawls. Between teaching starting at LMU's Beckett's Park and the building of new University of Leeds student accommodation (halls such as Weetwood, Cavendish, Tetley, and Bodington closing in favour of alternatives in and around city centre), the formal route ceased inclusion of central Weetwood and beyond and commonly headed south from Woodies' Ale House instead. With Woodies' (originally The Woodman) close to Beckett's Park and Lupton Flats, this route was similarly served by cheap "Green Zone" bus tickets. New main road pubs such as the Dry Dock and The Feast and Firkin (which had an on-site microbrewery) were among those also adopted, as were North Lane pubs such as Arc in due course. Many city centre bars and club nights also began to compete for acknowledgement as an official end point.

The idea that followers of the modern run should start early and visit as many venues as possible rather than cover a greater area has prompted creation of a Cumulative Impact Policy in 2005 aimed at limiting the adverse effect of Headingley's new pubs on the surrounding area and quickly led to some pubs voluntarily setting up an informal warning network aimed at turning away drinkers in fancy dress and in obvious large groups. As concern around commercial interest in student events emerged, both students' unions began to establish codes of conduct for societies regarding public events and associated coverage. In 2014 the NUS established a pilot Alcohol Impact scheme with Home Office backing that aimed to ensure promotion of responsible drinking among students in general, which the University of Leeds formally joined a year later.

By 2022, increase in crowd sizes had led to concerns that current and former student groups were being eclipsed by visiting stag and hen parties, and that associated complaints needed even greater involvement of the police and more support from venues.

Following an appeal to the original licensing rejection for conversion of the former Elinor Lupton Centre to The Golden Beam, an updated application was accepted which stated that participants in the Otley Run would be refused entry.

=== 2025 attack ===
In 2025, two women aged 19 and 31 participating in the run were shot by an attacker, Owen Lawrence, using a crossbow. The 19-year old was critically injured. Lawrence was arrested, but died two days later from a self-inflicted injury.

== Other university pub crawls ==
- King Street Run, Cambridge
- Subcrawl, Glasgow
- Smithdown Road, Liverpool
- Metro Pub Crawl, Newcastle
- Campus 14, Nottingham
- Didsbury Dozen, Manchester
- West Street, Sheffield
