= Informal hall =

At traditional Oxbridge and many Durham colleges, there may be two dinners in the college hall each evening, named informal hall and formal hall. Informal hall normally takes place before formal hall and does not require the wearing of a gown. It is typically self-service rather than being served by college servants. It is also relatively early in the evening, thus allowing students to pursue other activities later. In some colleges, this leads to its alternative name of first hall. Often the meal is also known by an informal name, such as Buttery, Trough, or just the Canteen.
