= High table =

Staff dining table at some universities

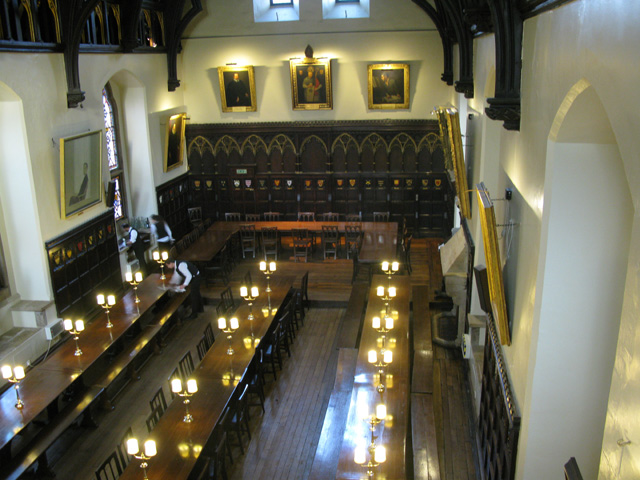
View towards the High Table in the dining hall of Merton College, Oxford. The lower tables have a mixture of chair and bench seating.

The high table is the table (often on a dais) where the most important guests are seated at a formal meal. These include state banquets, wedding receptions, university formals, and other formal events such as the White House Correspondents' Dinner. At some colleges in universities, the high table may be used by members of the senior common room during ordinary meals as well as at formal dinners.

== History ==
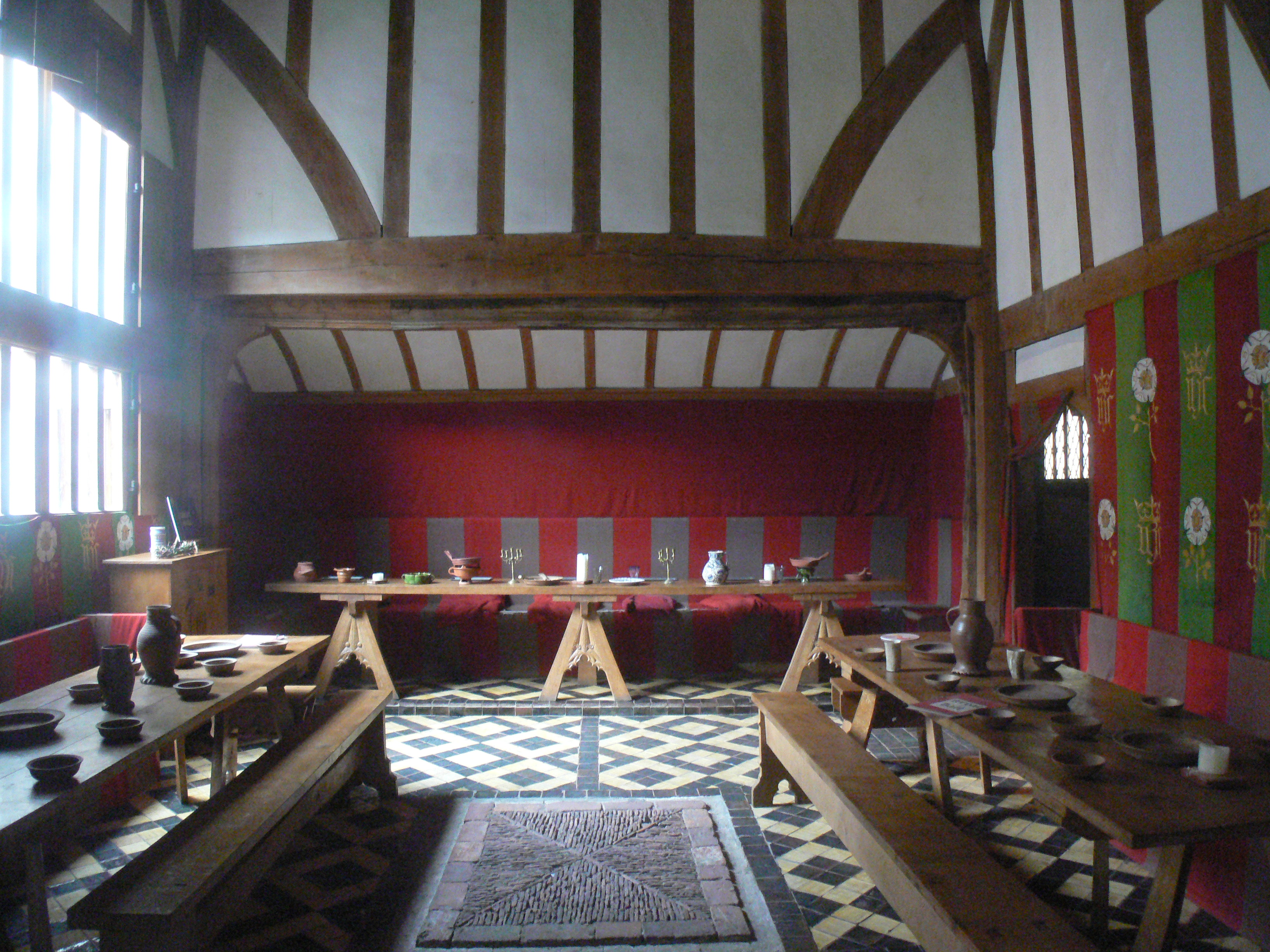
The restored great hall at Barley Hall in York, with the high table across the width of the hall and two other tables down its length

In the medieval period, the high table was where the host and the most important guests sat at meals in the great hall of a castle. It was at the far ends of the hall from the doorway to the kitchens, on a raised dais, and stretched across the width of the hall while they other tables, for the ordinary members of the castle household, ran down its length. This was preserved in the colleges of Oxford and Cambridge universities, where the students took the place of the members of the castle household and the fellows that of the lord and their guests. Traditionally the high table had chairs while the other tables had benches, and the food served at the high table could be completely different from that at the other tables.

== Universities ==
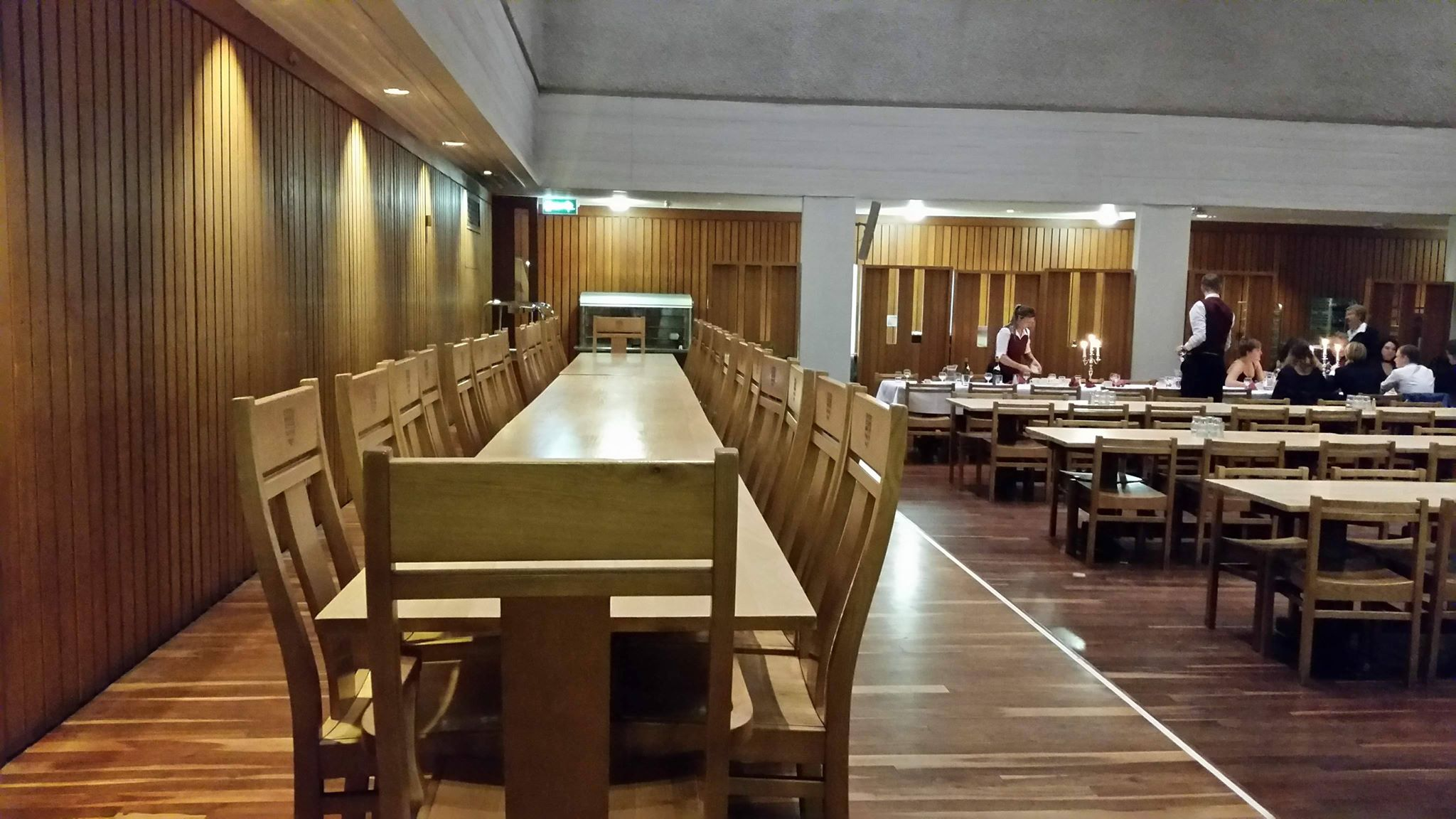
The high table in the dining hall of Fitzwilliam College at the University of Cambridge

The high table at universities is for the use of fellows (members of the Senior Common Room) and their guests in large university dining halls in some universities, where the students eat in the main space of the hall at the same time. They remain the norm at many colleges of Oxford, Cambridge and Durham universities, as well as at Devonshire Hall at the University of Leeds and St Anselm Hall at the University of Manchester in the UK, Trinity College Dublin in Ireland, St Paul's College, University of Sydney in Australia and the Graduate College at Princeton University in the US.

The high table is normally at the end of the dining hall on a raised platform, although this is not always the case. Typically, the high table is set across the breadth of the hall, and is thus at right angles to the tables in use by the main body of diners, which stretch along the hall's length. On more formal evening occasions, dinner jackets are worn. It is also still common to wear academic gowns, at least for dinner.

=== Other usage ===
At the University of St Andrews, "high table" refers to a small formal meal for a group of students and academics rather than to a high table in the dining hall. At Trinity College and Massey College in the University of Toronto, "high table" refers to the formal dinner for the whole college, as does "high table dinner" at universities in Hong Kong.
