= Hazel Irvine =

British sports presenter

Hazel Irvine MBE
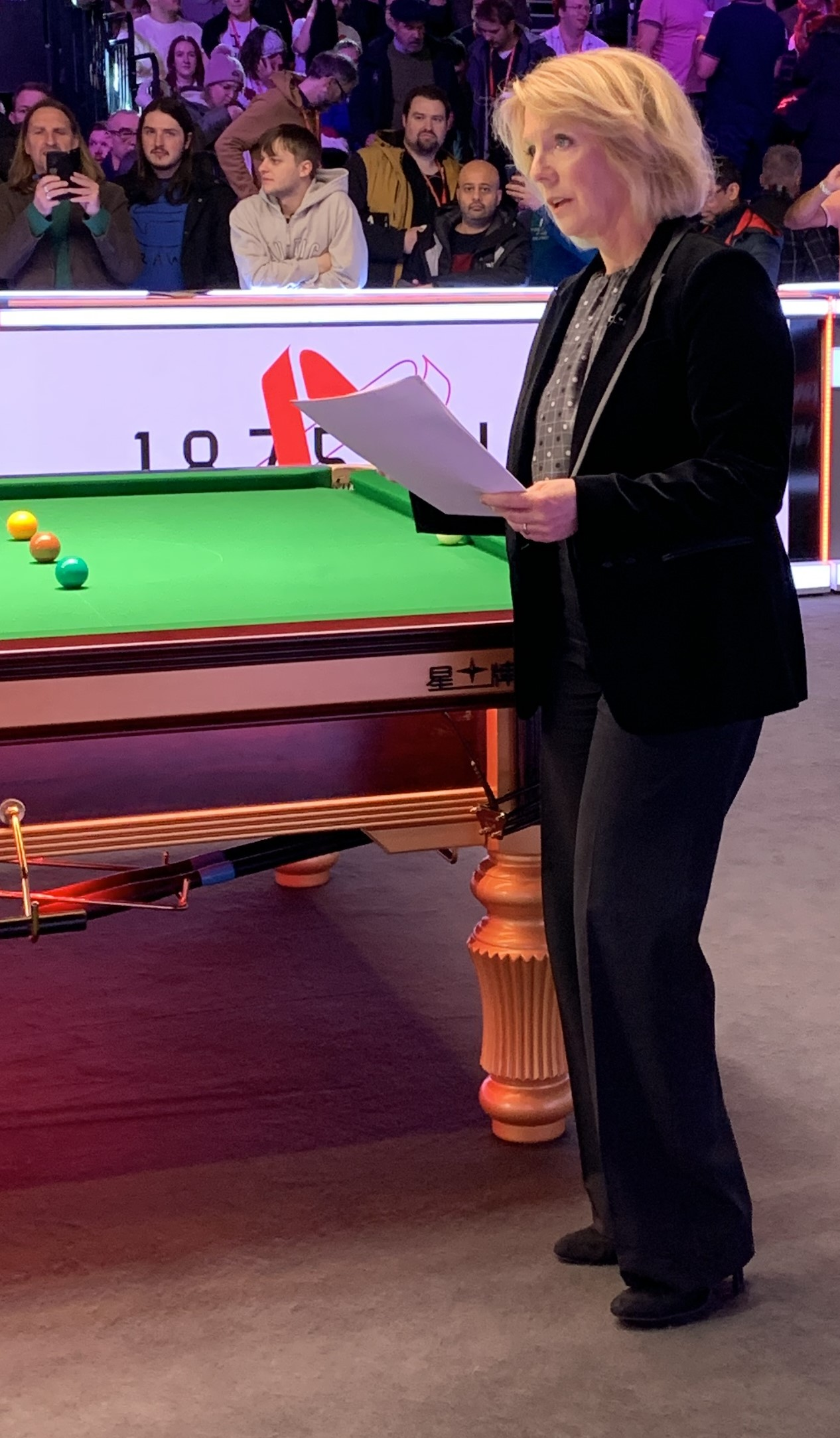
- Irvine in 2025
- Born: 24 May 1965 (age 61); St Andrews, Fife, Scotland
- Education: University of St Andrews
- Occupation: Sports presenter
- Years active: 1988–present
- Known for: Presenting the Olympics for the BBC
- Children: 1
- Parent(s): William Hyslop Irvine (father); Norma Bryson (mother)

Hazel Jane Irvine MBE (born 24 May 1965) is a Scottish sports presenter. Principally working for the BBC, Irvine has presented the Summer and Winter Olympics, the Commonwealth Games, the Triple Crown snooker events, all major golf events, and Ski Sunday.

== Early life ==
Irvine was born in St Andrews, Scotland. She has a younger brother, David William Irvine (born 1968). Educated at Hermitage Academy in Helensburgh, she achieved an MA in History of Art at the University of St Andrews, and competed in golf, netball and athletics at university level. In her final year she was Senior Student of Hamilton Hall.

== Broadcasting career ==
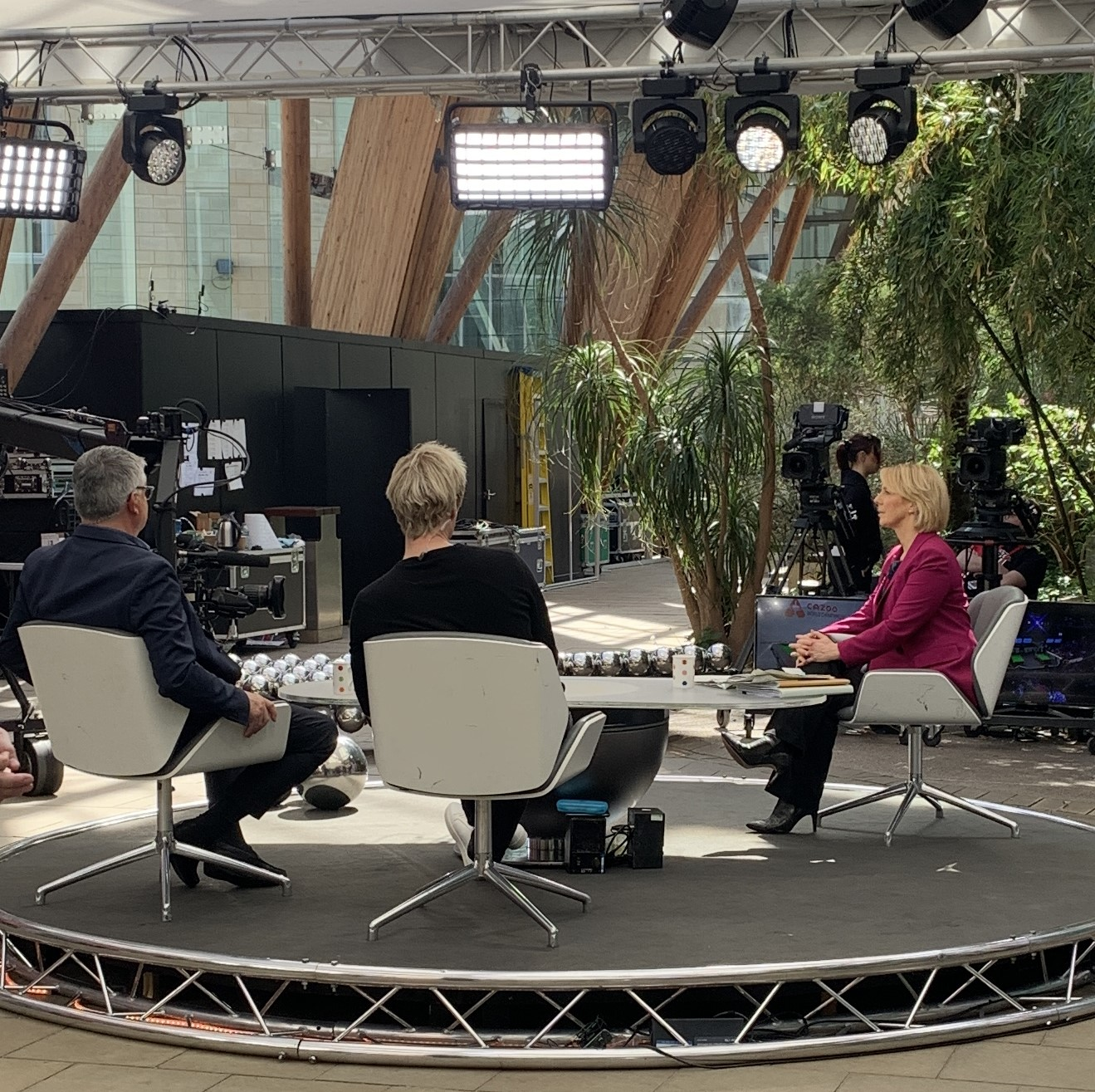
Irvine (right) in the studio for BBC coverage of the 2024 World Snooker Championship

Irvine began her broadcasting career on Radio Clyde in 1986, before moving to work for Scottish Television in 1988 as a continuity announcer and latterly, as a sports reporter/presenter. This led to slots on the national ITV network co-presenting coverage of the 1988 Olympics alongside Dickie Davies, and presenting reports from the Scotland football team's training camp at the 1990 World Cup.

Irvine joined the BBC in 1990, working as presenter on BBC Scotland's Sportscene programme and becoming the youngest-ever presenter of the BBC's flagship sports programme Grandstand on 19 June 1993. She also anchored BBC Scotland's coverage of Children in Need for ten years. In 1994, Irvine co-hosted the BBC's Hogmanay Live, and in 1995 she introduced coverage of the FIFA Women's World Cup and began reporting for Football Focus. Irvine has presented for the BBC at every Summer Olympics since Barcelona 1992, as well as five Winter Olympics and four FIFA World Cup tournaments. In December 1996, she became the lead presenter of Ski Sunday, initially with Julian Tutt, but then alone from 1997. She is also a regular presenter of the Triple Crown snooker tournaments (the World Snooker Championship, the Masters and the UK Championship) and since 2002 has led the BBC's coverage. She has also regularly presented the sports news on major BBC evening news bulletins, as well as reporting on events such as Wimbledon and the London Marathon.

At the Sydney 2000 Summer Olympics, Irvine fronted overnight action for the BBC. For the Salt Lake City 2002 Olympics, Irvine was a lead presenter for the BBC's coverage. At the Athens 2004 Games, Irvine hosted Olympics Grandstand with Steve Cram, the BBC's morning coverage of the games. In Turin in 2006, she was one of three lead presenters of coverage alongside Sue Barker and Clare Balding. In August 2008, Irvine presented Olympic Breakfast with Adrian Chiles as well as being one of the commentators for the opening and closing ceremonies of the 2008 Olympics in Beijing. She reprised these roles for the 2012 Games in London, this time presenting Olympic Breakfast with Bill Turnbull, as well as leading further coverage throughout the morning and afternoon. Irvine once again lead coverage of the Sochi 2014 Winter Games. At the Rio 2016 Games, Irvine once again provided commentary for the opening and closing ceremonies, as well as anchoring coverage of the early action of the day, broadcasting in the afternoons. In 2018, Irvine once again lead coverage from Pyeongchang. For the delayed Tokyo 2020 Games, Irvine again commentated on the ceremonies, as well as leading coverage with Gabby Logan of the day's later action, broadcasting through the morning and afternoon. At the Beijing 2022 Games, Irvine anchored coverage of the evening action, broadcasting through the morning. For Paris 2024, Irvine presented coverage of the afternoon action live from Paris. At Milano Cortina 2026, Irvine once again commentated on the ceremonies, this time alongside John Hunt, as well as presenting the morning action each day.

Irvine presented coverage of the Manchester 2002 Commonwealth Games for the BBC. For the Melbourne 2006 Games, Irvine was a main presenter of the BBC's coverage once again. This was a role she returned to for the Delhi 2010 Games. For the Glasgow 2014 Games, Irvine once again lead coverage, as well as commentating on the opening ceremony. For the Gold Coast 2018 Games, Irvine was one of two BBC presenters anchoring coverage live from Australia. At the Birmingham 2022 Commonwealth Games, Irvine fronted the afternoon coverage of events.

Irvine covered golf for the BBC as a reporter and presenter for 25 years, finishing with the Masters in April 2017.

Irvine also presented the 2019 Netball World Cup from Liverpool for the BBC.

She was appointed Member of the Order of the British Empire (MBE) in the 2024 New Year Honours for services to sport and charity.

== Other interests ==
Irvine also works as a media-trainer and after-dinner speaker.

== Personal life ==
Irvine married her long-term boyfriend at a private ceremony in Scotland in 2008. The couple live in London with their daughter, who was born in 2008.

Awards
Preceded by Mark Nicholas	RTS Television Awards; Best Sports Presenter; 2006	Succeeded by Incumbent
