= Otley Run pub crawl attack =

2025 crossbow attack in Leeds, England

- Location: Headingley, Leeds, England
- Date: 26 April 2025; 14:47 (BST)
- Target: Night club goers
- Attack type: Shooting
- Weapons: Break-barrel air rifle; Sig Sauer Rattler CO2 rifle; Pistol crossbow; Powerline Daisy 415 CO2 BB pistol; Modified blank pistol; Baseball bat (unused); Wooden shanks (unused)
- Deaths: 1 (the perpetrator)
- Injuries: 2
- Perpetrator: Owen Lawrence
- Motive: Misanthropy, misogyny

On 26 April 2025, two women were injured in a crossbow and air gun attack whilst participating in the Otley Run in Leeds, England. One woman required emergency surgery. The perpetrator, 38-year-old Owen Lawrence, was arrested at the scene, and was taken to the hospital after suffering a self-inflicted injury from an air gun. Lawrence died of his injuries two days after the attack.

A subsequent investigation into Lawrence's Facebook account began following the attack. It was discovered that he had posted a manifesto online prior to the attack, and detailed his plans for the "Otley Run Massacre", where he espoused misanthropic and misogynistic views.

== Background ==
The Otley Run is a popular pub crawl in the city of Leeds. The route follows the suburbs of Far Headingley, Headingley and Hyde Park before leading into Leeds City Centre. The majority of participants in the crawl are from 18 to 20 years of age due to a tradition of many students at Leeds' Universities viewing the pub crawl as a "rite of passage."

=== Perpetrator ===
Owen "Oz" Lawrence (born Owen Lawrence Eames, c. 1986 – 28 April 2025) was 38 years old at the time of his death. He was reported as living in a flat on Wood Lane Court in Headingley. The property was raided by police following Lawrence's identification as the perpetrator. In 2000, when Lawrence was 14, he had legally changed his name to Owen Lawrence, omitting his former surname. He was named as the perpetrator to the wider public on 28 April 2025 following his death in hospital, with police also stating that he had acted alone during the attack. He was registered as disabled at the time of the attack.

An investigation into Lawrence's Facebook account showed that he had expressed misogynistic and other extremist views. Posts from an account linked to Lawrence had also showed hatred for ideologies such as Feminism and Islamic extremism. Admiration for Brenton Tarrant was also expressed by Lawrence, possibly linked to his animosity towards Islam. Lawrence also stated his love for various mass shooters, including Anders Breivik, Eric Harris and Dylan Klebold, Pekka Eric Auvinen, Vladislav Roslakov, Randy Stair, and Ethan Blair Miller.

Lawrence had at one point posted two selfies of himself. In one he was wearing a white shirt with the phrase "Natural Selection" printed onto it, similar to the shirt worn by Eric Harris during the Columbine High School massacre. In another, he wore a white shirt with a Jerusalem cross imprint, a possible reference to Breivik. In the hours prior to the attack, Lawrence had made a post to his Facebook detailing his plans.

Friends and neighbours of Lawrence expressed shock at his attack, stating that he never expressed any of his far-right beliefs. They also recounted how he had experienced drug addiction and once previously amassed a weapons collection, mostly knives, that his mother had taken away from him. Lawrence was known to have stalked his former fiancée, who had learning difficulties, after a breakup around four years previous to the attack.

== Attack ==
At 2:47 p.m. on 26 April 2025, police were called after Lawrence shot two women, aged 19 and 31, on Otley Road in the Headingley area. The 19-year-old was found to be in critical condition and rushed to a nearby hospital. She would be made to undergo life saving surgery, and was eventually discharged on 30 April. After shooting himself in the head with an airgun, the perpetrator was arrested and hospitalised. He died two days later, on 28 April.

=== Aftermath and response ===
The Otley Run route was closed off until the Sunday following the incident to allow for investigators to carry out searches. Owen Lawrence was identified as the suspect after he died from his injuries. Counter Terrorism Policing would issue a statement in the days after the incident, stating that no other suspects were speculated to be involved in the attack.

The incident raised concerns around the country surrounding the growing threat of misogynistic violence. Just four years prior to the attack, a mass shooting in Plymouth was carried out by a self described Incel. Dr. Anna Kruglova from the University of Salford stated that people should be more "mindful" of the threat of misogynistic terrorism following the incident.

== See also ==
- Misogynist terrorism
- Hunt family murders
