= Formal (university) =

Traditional university meal

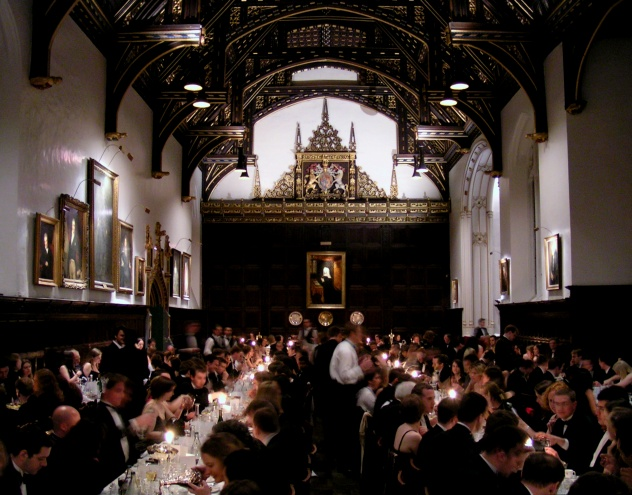
St John's College, Cambridge Formal Hall

A formal hall or formal dinner, commonly referred to as a formal, is a meal held at some of the older universities in the United Kingdom and Ireland, as well as some Commonwealth countries, at which students usually dress in formal attire and often gowns to dine.

== Practices and traditions ==
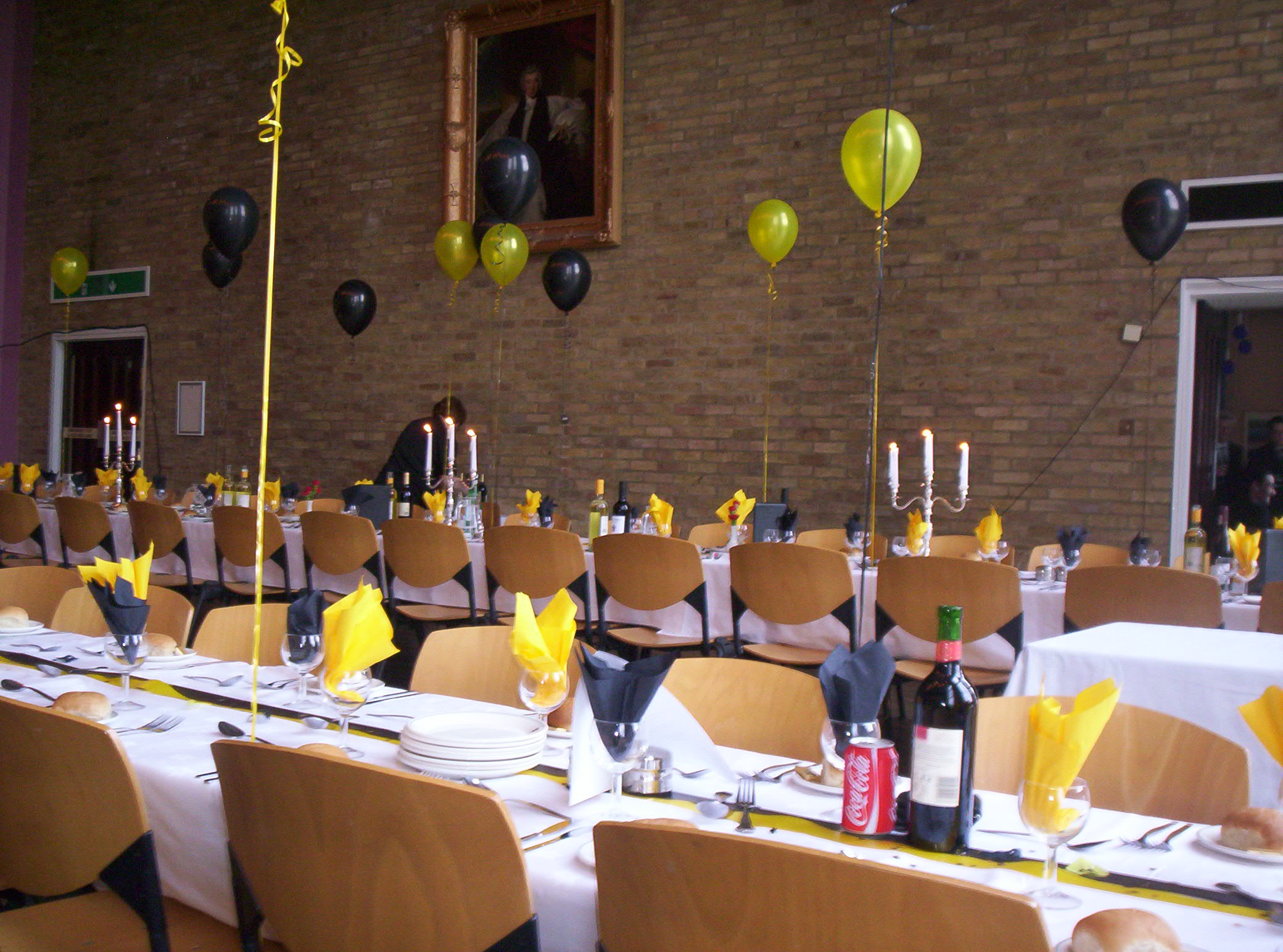
Mildert day formal at Van Mildert College, Durham

Formals are held commonly in colleges in the universities of Oxford, Cambridge and Durham, and at Trinity College Dublin (where they are known as commons). They are also held in some halls and colleges of other universities, including St Andrews, Leeds and Manchester in the UK; Adelaide, Melbourne, Queensland, Sydney, Tasmania, Western Australia Monash, New England and New South Wales in Australia; Toronto in Canada; and various universities in Hong Kong, including HKU, CUHK, and CityU.

Formals have declined in Britain in the 21st century, with the last formal at Wills Hall, University of Bristol, being held in 2018 and formals at some Durham colleges have been reduced from twice weekly in 2019 to every other week in 2026.

Some colleges and halls have elaborate traditions, while others are more relaxed. Grace may be said before the meal, in some places in Latin. The wearing of academic gowns at formals is compulsory at some colleges and halls; at others formal wear (for example, a lounge suit for men or equivalent for women) is required, and some colleges wear black tie. Fancy dress may be permitted for themed formals.

Drinking games are traditional at many, but not all, halls and colleges. These are banned in some colleges, such as St Cuthbert's Society, Durham, and Downing College, Cambridge.

Many formals include a high table, for members of the senior common room, their guests, and sometimes members of the middle common room or the junior common room executive, with other students eating at the lower tables. The high table may be raised above the floor level of the hall, on a dais. Some colleges, such as Linacre College, Oxford, do not have high tables. At Manchester halls, which do not have a close academic connection with the university and have always been largely undergraduate institutions, the executive committee of the junior common room sits at the high table.

There may be one or more after-dinner speakers at the end of the dinner or even between courses on special occasions. These have sometimes caused controversy, such as Rod Liddle at South College, Durham.

== Terminology ==
The full name and abbreviations to describe the formals differ. Generally, though, they are known as:

- Formal hall – used at Oxford, Cambridge and Durham
- Formal dinner – used at Durham and at Devonshire Hall, Leeds
- Commons – Trinity College Dublin
- Communal dinner – St Anselm Hall, Manchester
- High table – Trinity College and Massey College in the University of Toronto and most universities in Hong Kong.
  - In Hong Kong, they are also referred to as high table dinners, and may be used diglossically in Cantonese.

Abbreviations of the above terms tend to be either formal or, at St John's College, Cambridge, hall. There are other circumstances in which different names are used. For example, some larger colleges have both a large dining hall and a canteen-style dining room (often called the buttery or servery). In these cases informal evening meals are taken in the buttery and formal meals in the hall, and the term hall is used uniquely to refer to the latter meal. Some may call it second hall to differentiate from the earlier self-service first hall or informal hall.

== See also ==
- Informal hall
- Gaudy
