= John Hunt (sports commentator) =

British sports commentator

- Born: 1965 (age 60–61)
- Occupation: Sports commentator
- Years active: c.1987–present

John Hunt (born 1965) is a British sports commentator. Most often providing racing commentary, Hunt is also the regular commentary provider for the BBC's coverage of the Winter Olympic Games' opening ceremonies and sliding events, as well as for swimming at the Summer Olympic Games.

In July 2024, his wife and two of his daughters were murdered at their family home in Hertfordshire. The killer was given a whole-life sentence.

== Career ==
=== Racecourse commentary ===
Hunt gained an interesting in horse racing through seeing how emotional the sport made his father and, after this, travelling with his father to various racecourses to spectate. He has said without his father's interest, he would have stuck to spectating West Ham instead of watching the races. When Hunt was about 21 or 22 years old, his later-wife, Carol, saw an advertisement in the Harrow Observer for trainee commentators for Ladbrokes' in-house team. Hunt spoke to his chief inspector, who said he could take the trainee job and return to the police if it did not work out. Ladbrokes initially trained Hunt to commentate with dog racing. He then took a job at Sports Information Services in the early 1990s, where he had a full year for training on the job, which Hunt found very supportive. The first race he commentated alone after training was at Salisbury Racecourse in May 1992.

He has continued live racecourse commentary alongside his broadcasting career, and it was the races to which he initially returned following the murder of his wife and two of his daughters in July 2024, making his return on 9 September 2024 at Brighton. He commentated one of racing's premier events, Cheltenham, in March 2025 in the same week as the murderer was sentenced.

=== Broadcasting ===
Hunt began radio commentary for BBC Radio 5 Live in 2004 as well as continuing at racecourses. One of his "first big days" at Five Live came in 2004, commentating on the Grand National at the same time coverage of the FA Cup Final and England cricket was being broadcast. It was with the radio station he became a swimming commentator. In 2013, he commentated from the 2013 World Aquatics Championships in Barcelona. Great Britain did not win many medals at the event, and Hunt feared he would lose the job over lack of interest, before swimmer Adam Peaty started competing in 2014 and raised the success and profile. Having already commentated the equestrian at the 2012 Summer Olympics, Hunt was sent to the Commonwealth and Summer Olympic Games as a BBC swimming commentator after this.

In 2015, on his 50th birthday, Hunt was named the Horserace Writers' & Photographers' Association Broadcaster of the Year. He was nominated for the same award again in 2021.

He described joining the BBC coverage of the Winter Olympic Games as "a bolt from the blue"; they asked commentators if they would be happy to travel in person to Pyeongchang for the 2018 Winter Olympics, with only a small team sent out there. Hunt said that new experiences were getting harder to come by as he got older, so he asked to commentate on the bobsleigh and skeleton, which went well, although he nearly missed being able to commentate on the luge when Latvian diplomats joined the Latvian commentary team in the boxes and their security tried preventing other people from entering. Hunt was the BBC television commentator for the 2018 Winter Olympics opening and closing ceremonies. At the 2022 Winter Olympics he was joined by Gigi Salmon for opening ceremony commentary, and by John Jackson commentating on the sliding events.

Hunt withdrew from commentating at the 2024 Summer Olympics in July and August 2024. At the 2026 Winter Olympics, Hunt and Hazel Irvine provided commentary for the opening ceremony, with Hunt's appearance praised. He commentated the sliding events again, and the closing ceremony, which he "conveyed with his customary authority and poise" despite being upset by a melancholy part of a remembrance tribute to the point of crying in the dress rehearsal. He acknowledged this was not a bad thing, knowing that the moment would resonate with people experiencing grief.

== Early and personal life ==
Before becoming a commentator, Hunt worked in a newsagents', trained as a nurse – which he "absolutely loved" but left in order to move back to the London area – and then became a police officer in Kilburn.

Hunt was married to Carol from 1991 until her death, and the couple had three daughters: Amy (b. 1993), Hannah (1996–2024) and Louise (1999–2024). On 9 July 2024, Carol, Hannah and Louise Hunt were murdered in the Hunts' home in Hertfordshire by Louise's ex-boyfriend. Hunt and Amy said their devastation "cannot be put into words".

Hunt, who was working at the time, believed the murderer was aiming to kill him, too, had Hannah not called 999 and messaged her boyfriend to tell them who the attacker was. Hunt and Amy were upset by some of the inaccurate and sensationalist media response to the murders, and found the procedural side of the Crown Prosecution Service (CPS) sometimes cold and "clearly not fit for purpose". The CPS apologised to the family. They interviewed with Victoria Derbyshire in 2025 to redefine Carol, Hannah and Louise in the media. In March 2025, the killer was given a whole-life sentence.
