= Criminal possession of a weapon =

Crime

Criminal possession of a weapon is the unlawful possession of a weapon by an individual. It may also be an additional crime if a violent offense was committed with a deadly weapon or firearm.

Such crimes are public order crimes and are considered mala prohibita, in that the possession of a weapon in and of itself is not evil. Rather, the potential for use in acts of unlawful violence creates a perceived need to control them. Some restrictions are strict liability, whereas others require some element of intent to use the weapon for an illegal purpose. Some regulations allow a citizen to obtain a license or other authorization to possess the weapon under certain circumstances. Lawful uses of weapons by civilians commonly include hunting, sport, collection and self-defense.

== Types ==
Criminal possession of a weapon generally falls into one of several categories:

=== Simple possession ===
The strictest of standards, some weapons are prohibited from any form of private ownership at all, even if kept in one's dwelling under secure conditions (such as a safe). Typically, this covers military devices, such as bombs, artillery, machine guns, nuclear devices and chemical weapons.

However, this may also include possession of otherwise-legal weapons by a person of a class explicitly prohibited by law or court-order from possessing them. United States federal law, for instance, defines several classes prohibited possession of firearms under the Gun Control Act of 1968 (18 U.S.C. § 922(g) ) including:

- convicted felons (§ 922(g)(1))
- fugitives from justice (§ 922(g)(2))
- unlawful users or addicts of a controlled substance (§ 922(g)(3))
- mental defectives (§ 922(g)(4))
- illegal aliens (§ 922(g)(5))
- dishonorably discharged servicemen (§ 922(g)(6))
- persons who have renounced United States citizenship (§ 922(g)(7))

=== Carry of a concealed weapon ===
A restriction (ban) on carrying of certain weapons on one's person in such a manner that it is hidden from view of others. This can sometimes include somewhere in the same vehicle or close to one's immediate surroundings where the weapon is easily reachable.

=== Carry in plain sight ===
The opposite of concealed carry, some jurisdictions make it a crime to carry certain weapons in plain view of others. Reasons may be to prevent intimidation or menacing; to create a friendlier-looking population by removing visual symbols of violence; or to intimidate/control a segment of the population known for the carry of certain weapons (such as the samurai caste during the Meiji era).

=== Carry on or about the person ===
A combination of the above, this type of restriction makes it illegal to carry the weapon at all, whether concealed or not. This may or may not include the person's own land or place of business.

== Strict liability vs. specific intent ==
All weapon possession crimes follow some standard of intent (mens rea), though this standard varies. The most common is "strict liability," meaning that there is no requirement of intent whatsoever: Merely being caught by law enforcement with the weapon in question under the circumstances described in the law (possession, concealed, or open) is a crime in and of itself, with almost no possible defense other than proving the item is not an illegal weapon within the law's definition. Some laws allow the accused a defense to the charge that the item in question was going to be used for a specific set of lawful purposes, such as one's occupation (examples are sets of knives carried by a line cook en route to his job, or tools carried by a construction worker or craftsman). In this case, the burden of proof is often placed on the accused, requiring them to prove their lawful intent in court.

Other laws require proof of specific intent to commit a criminal act by the accused, thereby placing the burden on the state to produce evidence that the weapon was possessed with some unlawful purpose (such as an attempted homicide, robbery, or assault). The circumstances under which law enforcement discover the weapon often play a strong role in this.

== Exceptions ==
Many laws about weapon possession contain exemptions for persons of specific occupations or allow for permission to be obtained from the government to lawfully possess the weapon.

Generally, military personnel actively carrying out their duties are exempt from nearly any restriction other than internal policy and international treaties. However, they are often restricted from possessing their issued weapons when they are not on duty.

Police often are allowed to lawfully possess certain weaponry above what the populace is allowed to possess, though this varies by nation and jurisdiction. In some nations police may take their armaments home when off duty, while in others they are required to leave all (or some) of them in storage at their station. Some jurisdictions have special paramilitary units (such as SWAT or AFO) that carry machine guns, explosives or other military weapons, though the majority of the time these must be stored at the unit's headquarters.

For civilians, permits can sometimes be obtained to possess or carry certain weapons if that person meets certain qualifications that show they can be trusted (such as safety training and lack of prior criminal behavior) and/or have a specific need for the weapon, for example if the nature of their job places them at high risk for assault or robbery. The most common in the United States is a permit to carry a concealed handgun for purposes of self-defense. This permit often applies to both firearms and other self-defense implements. In many states, no permit at all is needed to carry a non-concealed firearm or other weapon. Other types of licenses can be obtained for collection and exhibition purposes, such as under the National Firearms Act. In the UK, a citizen can obtain a firearms or shotgun certificate in order to legally purchase and own rifles or shotguns for the purposes of sport and hunting.

== Legislation by weapon type ==
- Overview of gun laws by nation
- Knife legislation
- Laws on crossbows
- Legality of batons
- Legality of brass knuckles
- Legality of nunchaku
- Legality of pepper spray
- Legality of blowguns
- Ninja stars today

== See also ==
- Concealed carry in the United States
- Right of self-defense
- Gun control
- Gun politics
- Possession of a firearm or ammunition by a prohibited person
