= University of Leeds accommodation =

Halls of residence at the University of Leeds, England

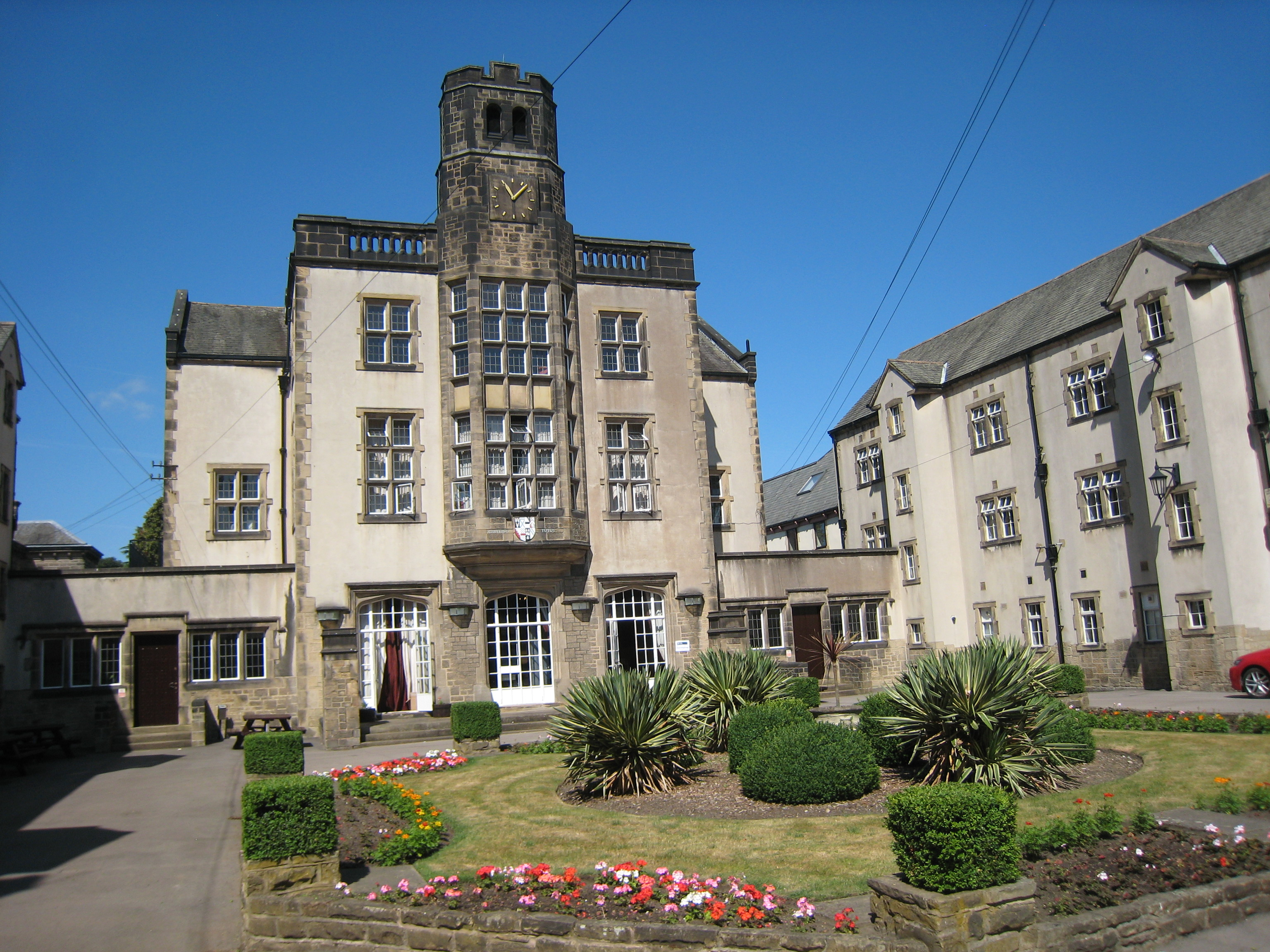
Devonshire Hall, Cumberland Road

This is a list of halls of residence both on and off campus at the University of Leeds in Leeds, West Yorkshire, England.

The list is split to show halls providing catered and self–catered accommodation and includes a section on halls that are no longer used as University of Leeds residences. Most sites provide general student accommodation but where all, or the majority of residents, are post-graduate or international students this is highlighted. Similarly, where residences include or are adjacent to particular facilities, e.g. music, sports, stores, food outlets, or entertainment venues, this may be mentioned. The distance between the residence and the campus and to the city centre are included where pertinent.

== Catered ==
=== Charles Morris Hall ===
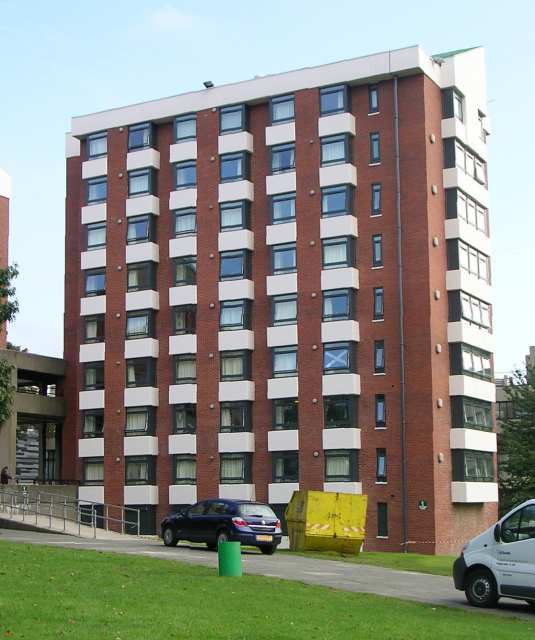
Charles Morris Hall on the main campus

Mount Preston Street, LS2 9JP, is home to Charles Morris Hall (53.8057°N 1.5579°W), consisting of four blocks of buildings; Storm Jameson East, Storm Jameson West, Dobree and Whetton. Dobree and Whetton accommodate 80 students in each of two blocks with most bedrooms having a washbasin but share a bathroom. The hall was named after former Leeds University Vice-Chancellor Charles Morris, Baron Morris of Grasmere. The hall was refurbished in 2010, with the original Mary Ogilvie House demolished and replaced by Storm Jameson East & West. All rooms in Storm Jameson are en-suite and are also fitted with double beds.

=== Devonshire Hall ===
Devonshire Hall (53.8184°N 1.5651°W) is located on Cumberland Road, off Headingley Lane, the main Leeds to Otley road. approximately one mile north from the centre of campus. Devonshire Hall comprises the main hall, formerly a Victorian manor house, as well as a number of newer annexes along Cumberland Road. 260 students live in catered residences, while another 300 reside in self-catering rooms. It is the only residence to hold formals, for which gowns are provided. Typically there is a formal at the start of the academic year and for Halloween, Christmas, Burns' Night and St Patrick's Day. These are attended by the Warden of the hall, the JCR and other senior members of the university who sit at the High Table. The President says Grace in Latin before Hall sits and the meal is served. The Devonshire bar is located in the main foyer but is now permanently closed. Above the foyer is the Tabbron JCR, music practice rooms, 3 snooker tables and a pool table. Behind the dining room lies a small gym, squash court and a Fives court.

The main building (built in 1928 in Scottish Baronial style) is Grade II listed. Devonshire Hall also encompasses six annexes (R block, Old Hall, Ruse, Ridgeway, Elmfield and Springhill) and modern purpose built buildings (The Orchards, 1993; North Lawn, 1994; and the Grosvenor complex, 1994).

Devonshire Hall is the only hall at the University to hold a regular alumni reunion dinner. Known at the Society of Old Devonians, fondly known as SODs, the reunion dinner is held each year in June or July. Everyone who has lived in the hall at any point is welcome to attend. The dinner has attendees aged from 25 to over 90 years old.

=== Ellerslie Global Residence ===
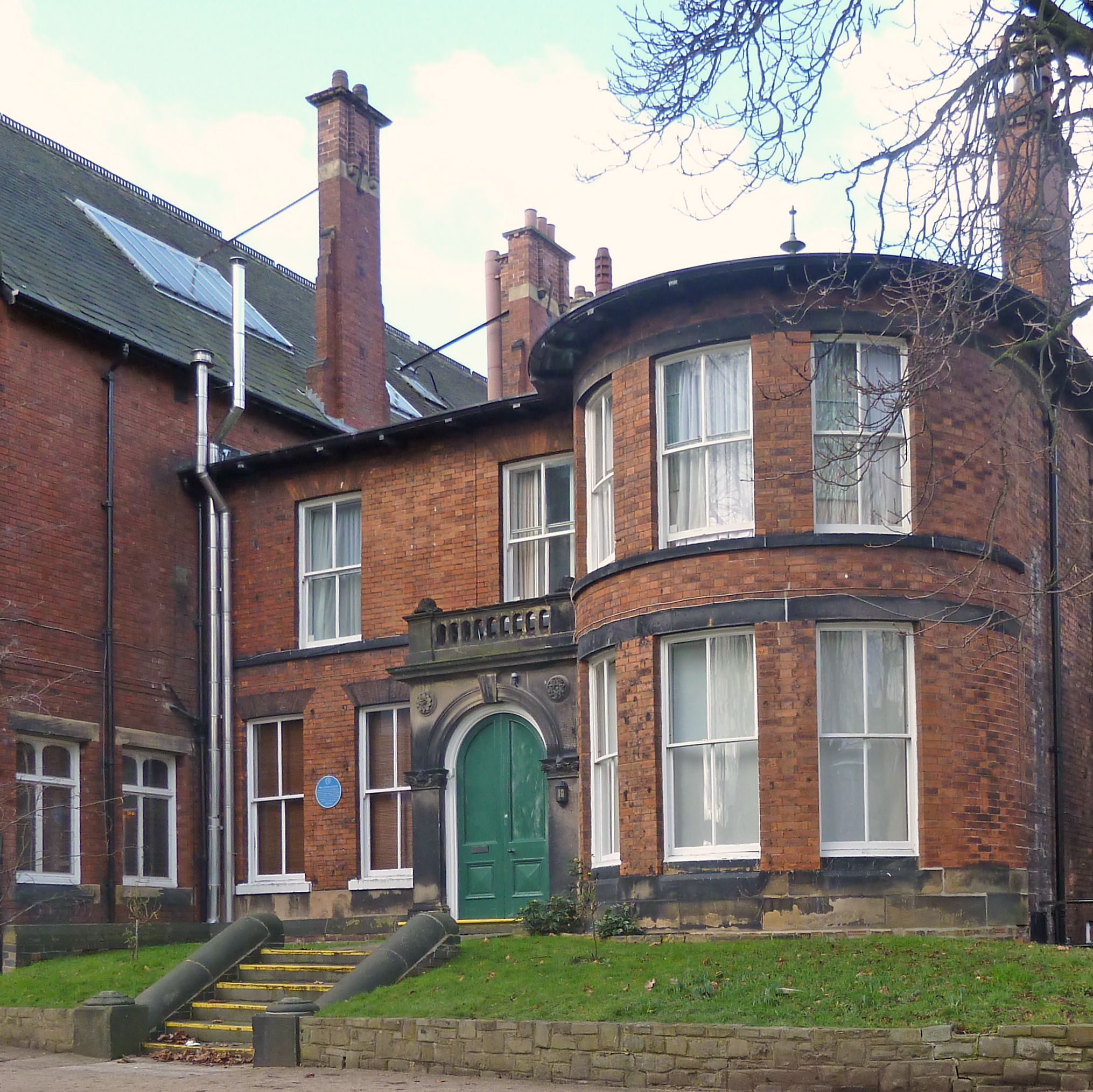
Lyddon Hall on the main campus

Ellerslie Global Residence (53.8075°N 1.5590°W), located on Lyddon Terrace, LS2 9LQ, is a set of 3 refurbished Victorian houses on campus. It has a total of 97 bedrooms. Ellerslie is a fully catered hall but also provides cooking facilities for students to make snacks.

=== Lyddon Hall ===
Lyddon Hall (53.8062°N 1.5569°W), located on Virginia Road, LS2 9JW, is a refurbished brick building comprising the original Virginia Cottage built in 1826 and a larger residential wing completed in 1892. This was the home of Sir Clifford Allbutt, inventor of the clinical thermometer. It is situated in the middle of the campus and is the university's oldest hall of residence. The hall contains 145 rooms, and 113 of these study bedrooms have a washbasin but share a shower and toilet with a neighbour.

== Self-catered ==
In addition to the purely self-catered halls given here, self-catered accommodation is also available at the Charles Morris and Devonshire halls listed above under 'catered'.

=== Blenheim Point ===
Blenheim Point is a postgraduate residence run in partnership with Harrison.

=== Carlton Hill ===
Carlton Hill is run in partnership with Unipol.

=== Central Village ===
Central Village (53.8039°N 1.5502°W), new in 2013–14, is run in partnership with Downing Developments. It has 943 single en suite rooms and 36 studio apartments, suitable for two persons sharing.

=== CitySide ===
CitySide is run in partnership with Downing Students.

=== Henry Price Residences ===
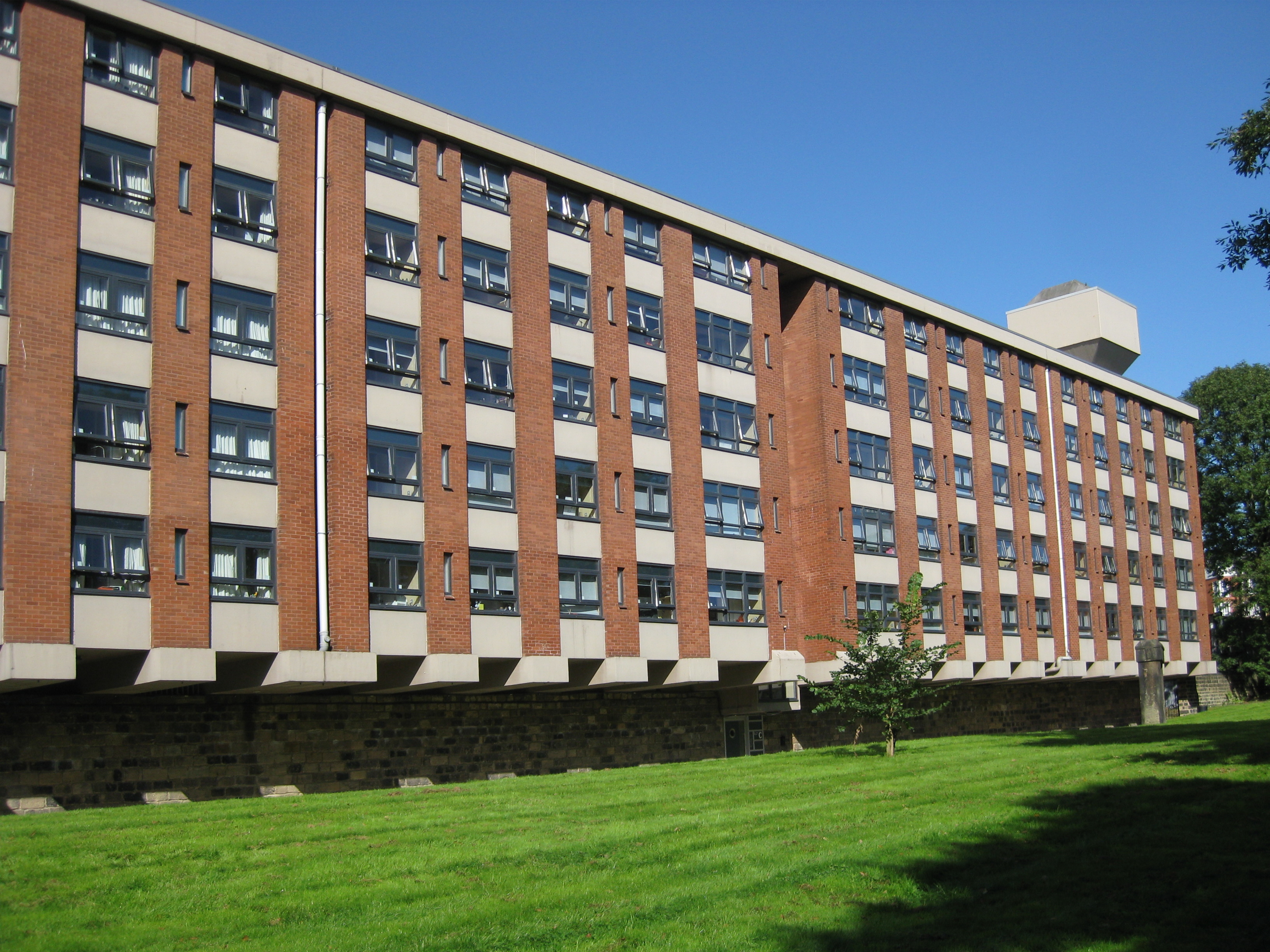
The Grade II listed Henry Price Residences by architects Chamberlin, Powell and Bon

Henry Price Residences (53.8088°N 1.5584°W) is the only self-catered residence on campus. There are 40 self-contained flats spread across five blocks. The five-storey building provides accommodation for up to 355 students. The ground floor is used for bicycle storage and the site reception. Flats generally have nine individual rooms (one of which is a double) and a kitchen/common room. Adjacent single rooms share a communal shower and toilet. The double rooms have en-suite facilities. All rooms have wardrobes, desks, chairs and fitted beds.

The Henry Price Building was designed by architects Chamberlin, Powell and Bon, who also designed other Brutalist building in a similar style, such as the Barbican in London. Henry Price gained Grade II listed status from English Heritage in 2010.

=== James Baillie Park ===
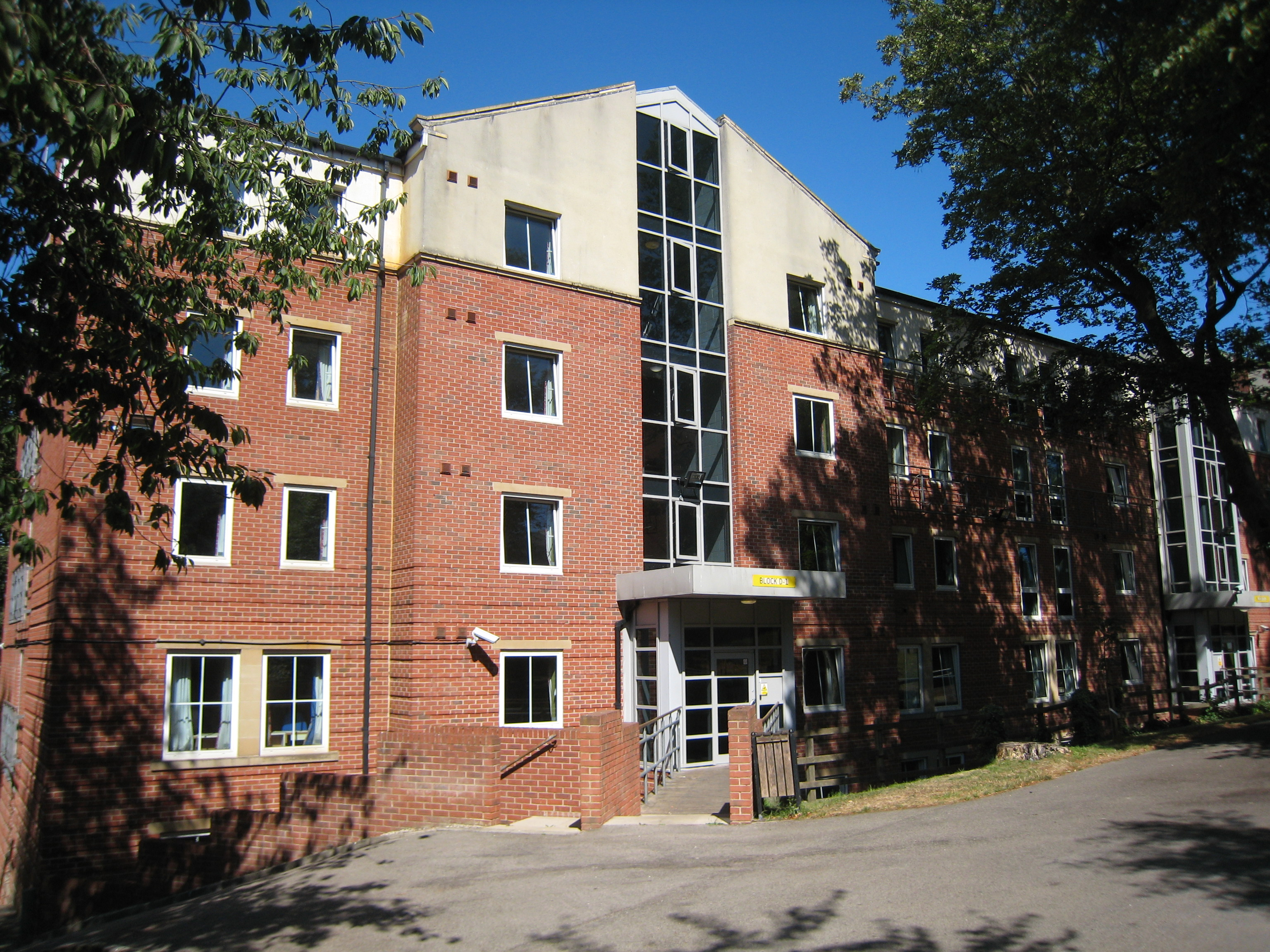
James Baillie Park, Block 1

James Baillie Park (53.8206°N 1.5662°W) is positioned at the end of North Hill Road, close to both Devonshire Hall and North Hill Court.

The site is managed by Unite Students and has 560 rooms available with most being en-suite; some studio flats are available and there are a few cluster flats housing 3 students sharing a bathroom. Most kitchens are shared between 6 residents; some share between 4 while cluster flats share between 3.

=== Leodis Residences ===
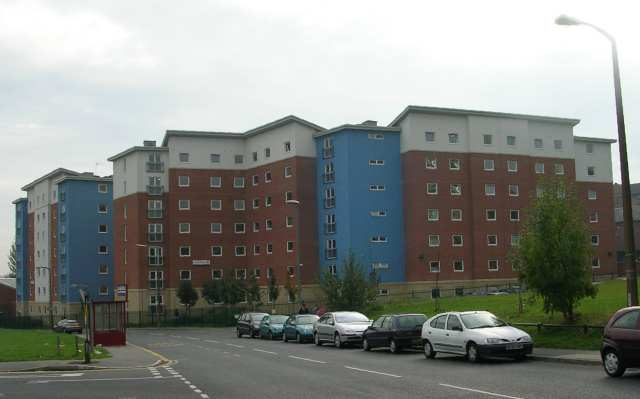
Leodis Residences, North West Road

Leodis Residences (53.8117°N 1.5481°W) are located on North West Road, LS6 2QF. These residences are run in partnership with Collegiate AC and accommodate 715 students with most of the rooms being en-suite. The hall is located approximately 10 minutes from the university, just by the Montague Burton residences.

Leodis consists of 9 blocks with blocks B - J (with no block I) being newly built and containing en-suites with lifts for the 7 floors and block A being a converted mill building with 4 floors plus 2 extra flats in the roof, there is no lift in this block. The halls are currently operated by Collegiate-AC on behalf of the University of Leeds.

=== Lupton Residences ===
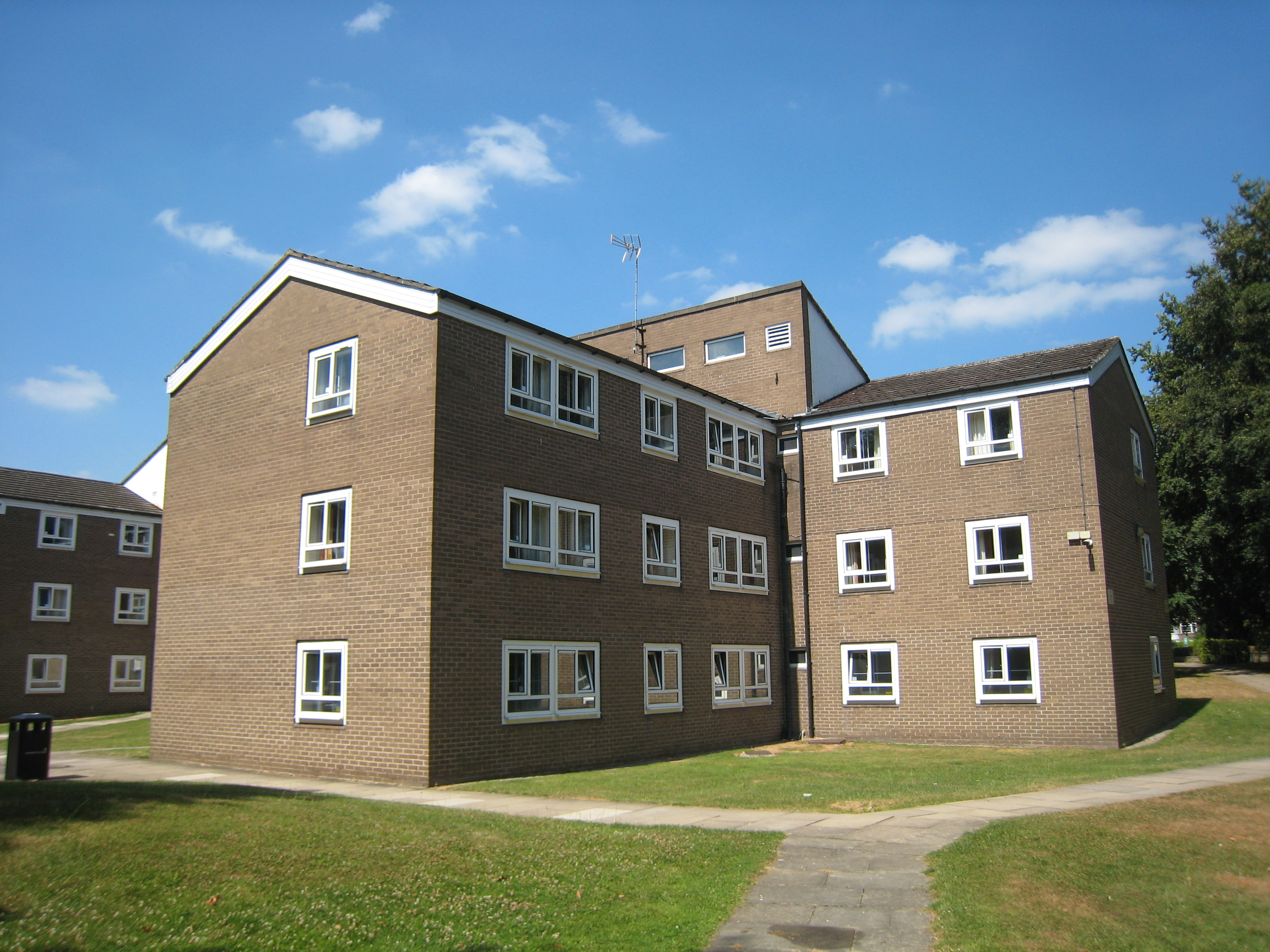
Lupton Residences

Lupton Residences (53.8224°N 1.5761°W) are located on Alma Road in the centre of Headingley, behind Sainsbury's, Wilkinson, and other shops along the Headingley shopping strip. The residences were named after two members of the Lupton family: Dr. Elinor Lupton, for 23 years the chair of the Women's Halls Committee, and her father, Dr. Arthur Lupton, the university's first pro-chancellor.All blocks but 1 contain 9 flats across 3 floors with 5 people per flat. These flats share one kitchen and one bathroom between the 5 people. Lupton Residences is one of the cheaper options of University Accommodation as the flats do not have a living room and the beds are single rather than doubles, however Lupton Residences are considered to be very sociable with lots of outdoor space great for summer barbeques. Jacqueline Hill, the last of the Yorkshire Ripper's victims lived in the halls at the time of her murder. Her body was found on waste ground off Alma Road between the flats and the Arndale Centre in November 1980.

=== Montague Burton Residences ===
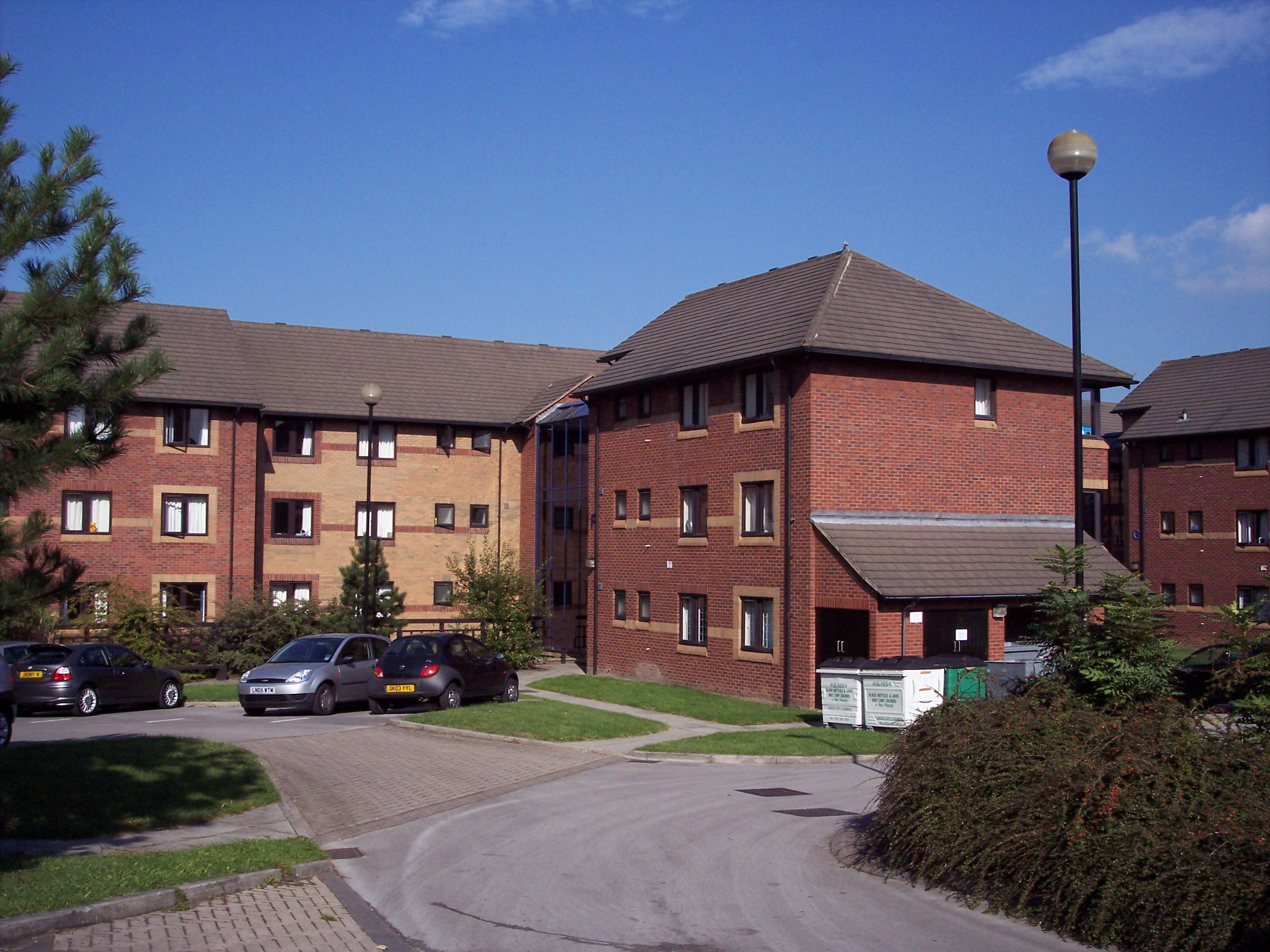
Montague Burton Residences, Block F from the central area

The Montague Burton Residences (53.8105°N 1.5482°W), which were opened in the early 1990s, are situated on Devon Road, approximately five to eight minutes walk away from the Parkinson Building at the front of the University of Leeds. They are named after Montague Burton, founder of Burton Menswear. The residences house 480 students in standard rooms with a washbasin. Flats are shared between four or nine people.

Despite the proximity to the campus, the residences were nicknamed "Fort Apache" when they first opened because they stood within a swathe of wasteground. Its isolated location lived up to its nickname on Bonfire Night in 1993 when fireworks struck the building and burning bins were rolled against the main gates. While university security guarded entrances, residents were ordered to stay in their rooms as police fought running battles outside with local hooded youths.

=== North Hill Court ===
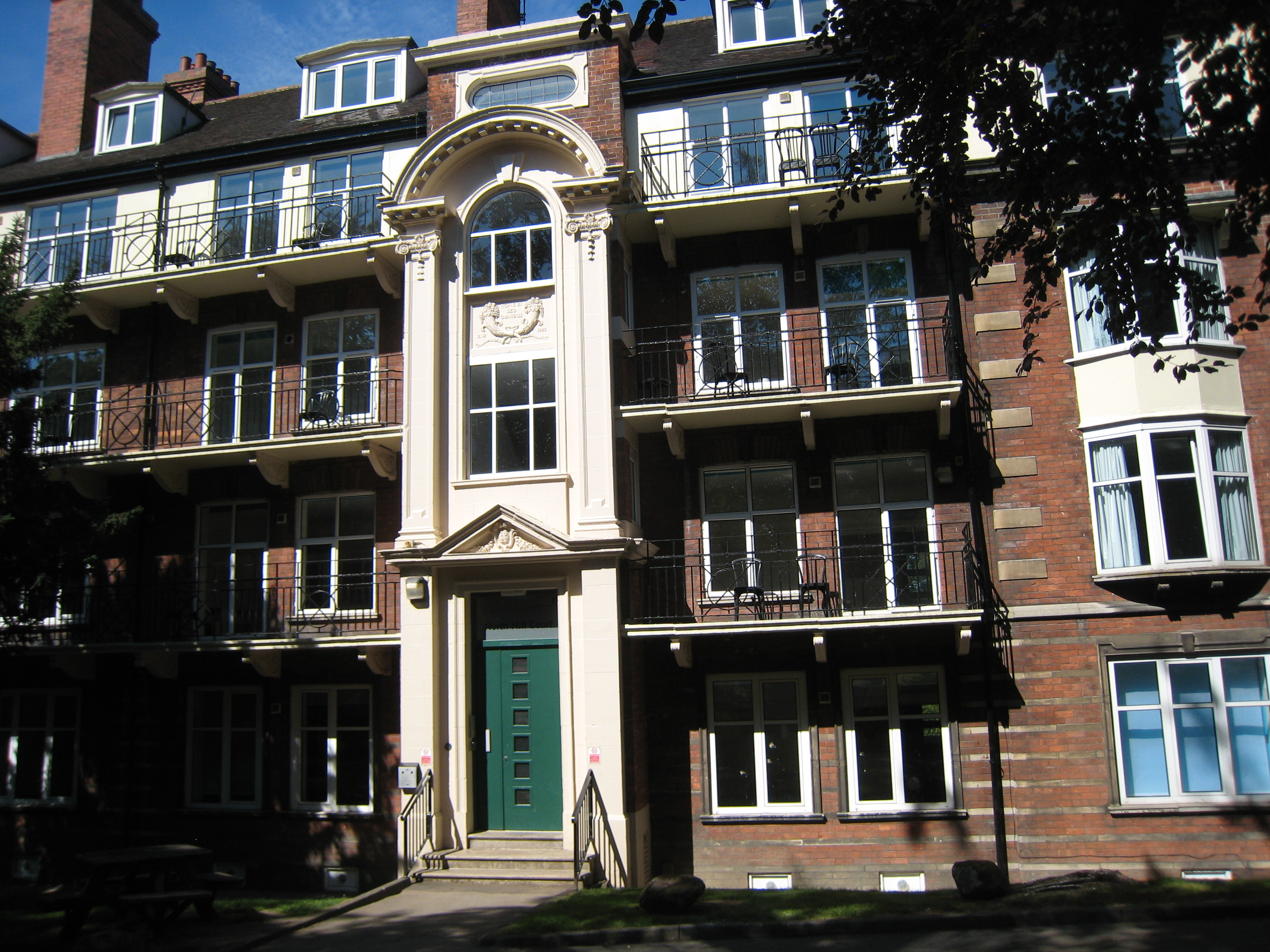
North Hill Court: 1923 Edwardian building with motto Non sibi sed omnibus - not for yourself, but for all

North Hill Court (53.8208°N 1.5676°W) is close to Devonshire Hall and shares its site with James Baillie Park. It is comparatively small; with a total population of only 76 students over 18 flats (numbered 2 to 20, excluding 11). Contracts are 42 weeks long, starting a week and a half before term.

=== Royal Park Flats ===
Royal Park Flats are postgraduate residences managed by Unipol Student Homes.

=== Sentinel Towers ===
Sentinel Towers (53.8002°N 1.5625°W) is located on Burley Street, approximately a 15-minute walk from the western end of the university campus. It is divided into two blocks, Tower A and Tower B. Tower B is occupied by international exchange, second year and postgraduate students. Tower A is a mix of first-year students and international students.

It comprises 240 en-suite rooms, organized into flats of between 4 and 8 students all sharing kitchen facilities. There are no living rooms as in some of the other student halls. It has a secure parking area beneath the bases of the Towers which is accessed only by keyfob with a capacity of around 10 cars. This is adequate as most exchange students do not have cars.

=== St Mark's Residences ===
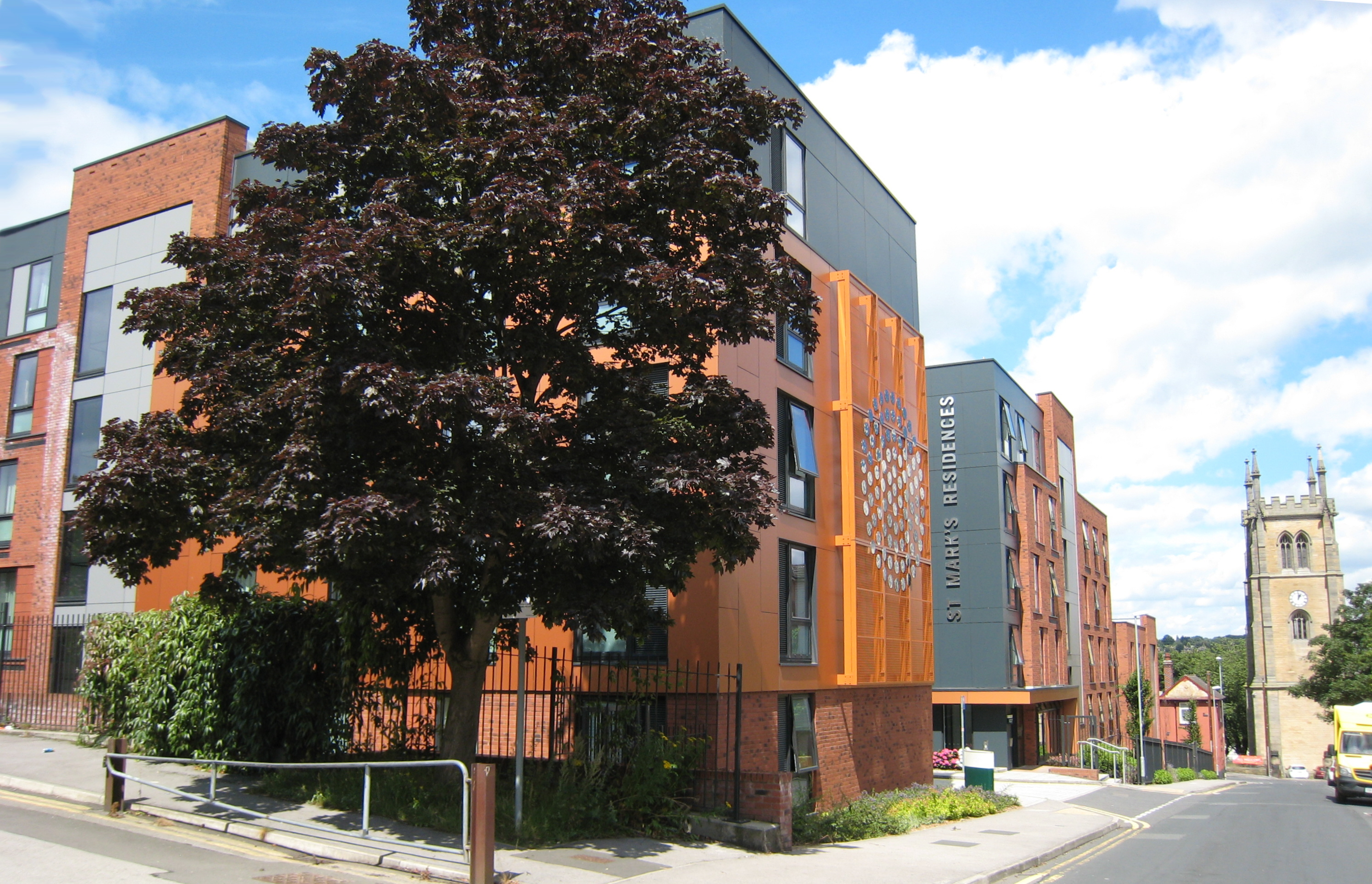
St Mark's Residences

St Mark's Residences (53.8114°N 1.5546°W) in St Marks Street, LS2 9EL is only available to postgraduate students. It has 529 en-suite bedrooms including 462 premium rooms with a larger footprint. Each flat has a washing machine, dryer and a flat screen TV.

=== White Rose View ===
White Rose View is run in partnership with Unite Students.

== Former ==
=== Albert Mansbridge Hall ===
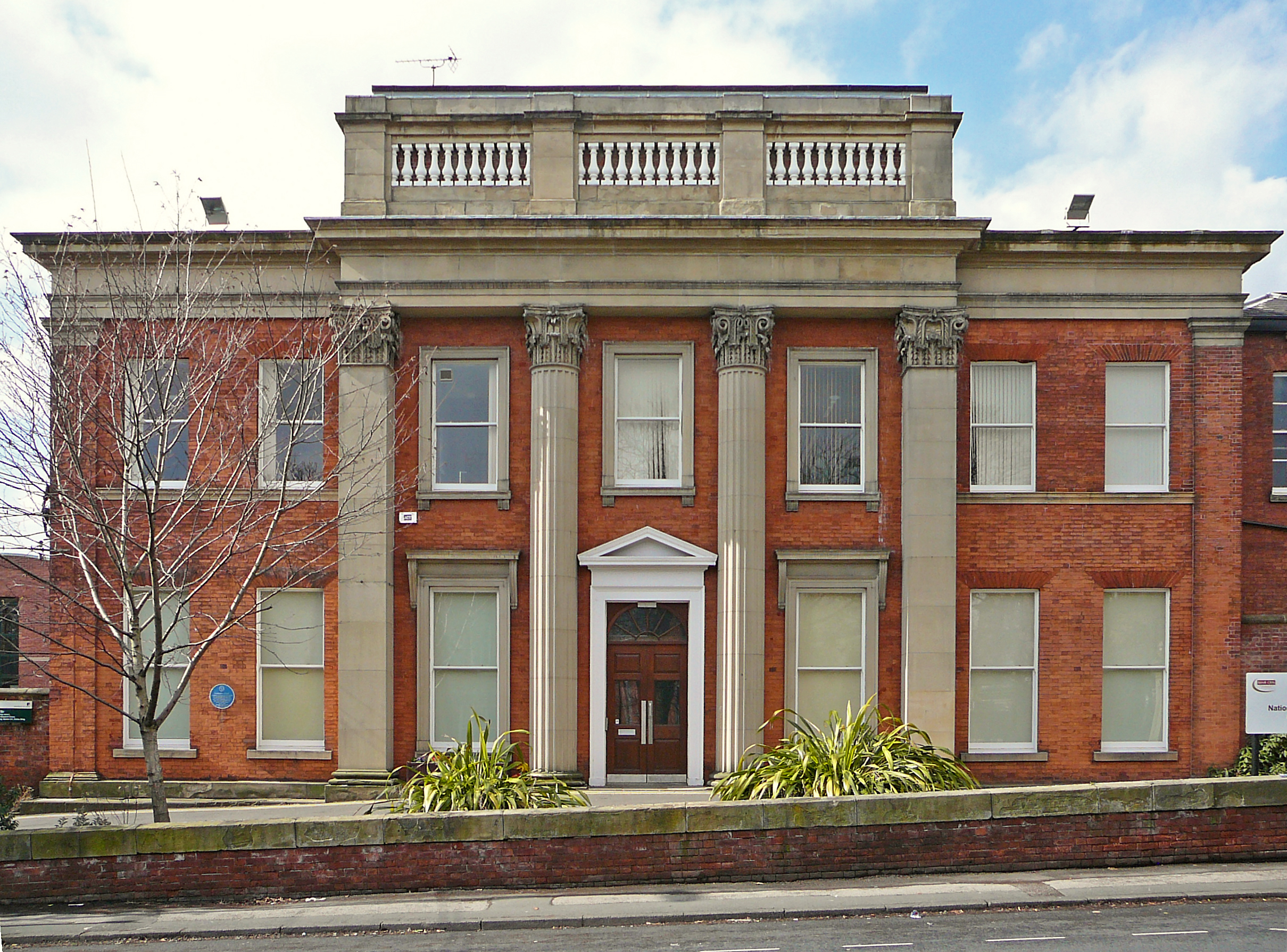
Fairbairn House, formerly Albert Mansbridge Hall

Albert Mansbridge Hall (53.8045°N 1.5615°W) 71–75 Clarendon Road, was formerly called Woodsley House and built for Sir Peter Fairbairn. It was Grade II listed by English Heritage in 1963. It is no longer a university residence and, renamed Fairbairn House, houses a residential and conference facility of the Nuffield Institute for Health Services Studies.

=== Bodington Hall ===
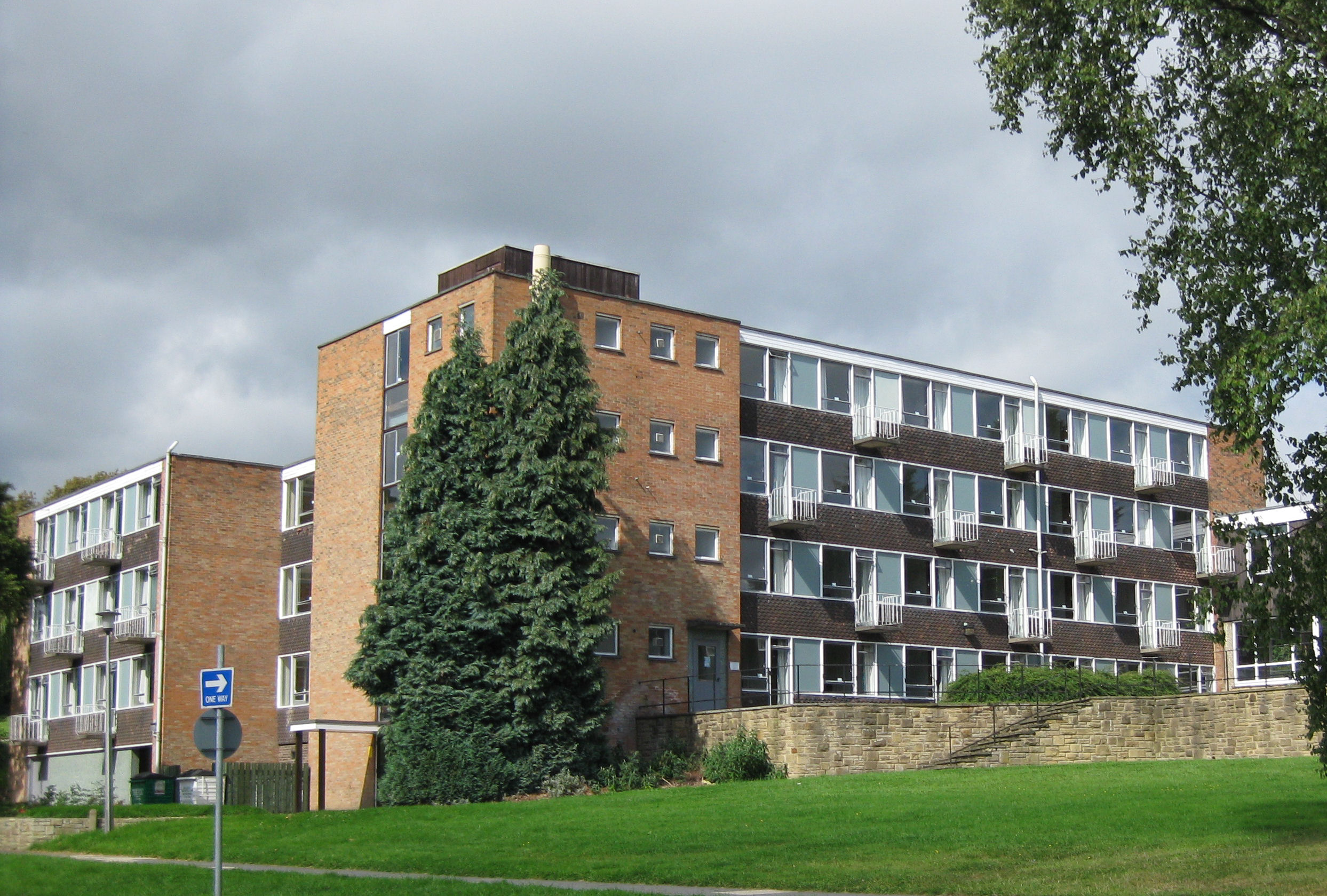
Student flats at Bodington Hall

Bodington Hall (53.8444°N 1.5876°W), known as Bod, was formerly the largest student residence for the university, and occupied mainly by first year students. It was located between Lawnswood and Adel, approximately 4 miles north of the main campus near the Leeds Outer Ring Road.

The residence closed in 2012 and the university obtained planning permission for the construction of 160 homes on land occupied by the former buildings and applied for planning permission for 30 more on adjacent land.

=== Broadcasting Tower ===
Broadcasting Tower (53.8058°N 1.5479°W), run in partnership with Downing Developments, was only available for 2014–15.

=== Carr Mills ===
Carr Mills (53.8160°N 1.5454°W) residence was located on Buslingthorpe Lane, off Meanwood Road on the border of Meanwood and Woodhouse. Carr Mills, a converted textile mill, contained 300 en suite rooms with kitchens shared between 4 or 6 rooms. This residence was privately rented accommodation which was wholly leased by the university. Signs with university branding erected at Carr Mills during this agreement are still in situ, although with slight amendment.

=== Clarence Dock Village ===
Clarence Dock Village is run in partnership with Unite Students.

=== clv Leeds ===
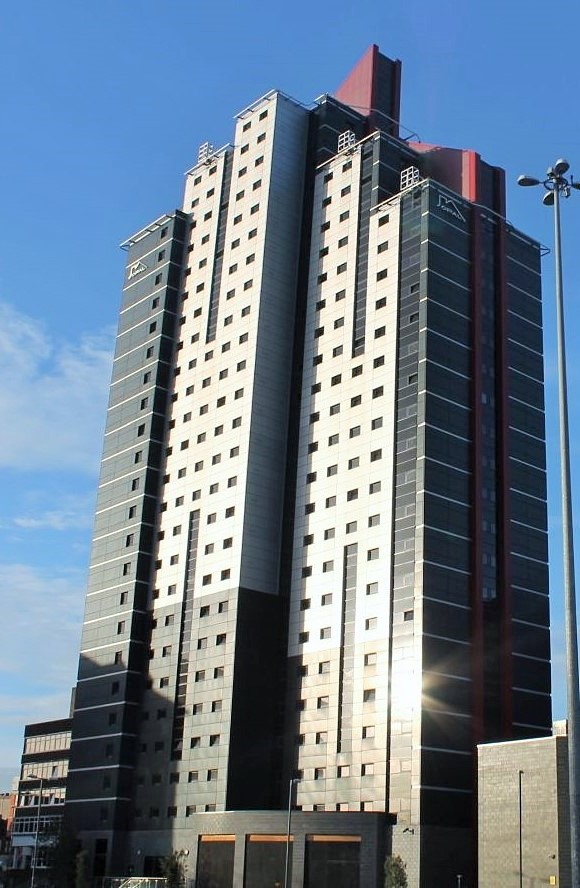
clv Leeds at the Opal Tower / Opal 3, Leeds

clv Leeds had 542 en suite rooms (300 available to University of Leeds first year students) in Opal Tower, Leeds, run in partnership with Campus Living Villages.

=== Grayson Heights ===
Grayson Heights (53.8141°N 1.5956°W) has been wholly leased from Unipol. It is used for housing postgraduates and families.

=== Liberty Dock ===
Liberty Dock was located on Clarence Road LS10 1LU, close to the city centre, situated by the River Aire and near the Royal Armouries. It contained 610 en–suite rooms including some modified for disabled students. The accommodation, with some refurbished flats, was run by Liberty Living.

=== Concept Place ===
Concept Place was located in Park Lane, off Burley Street. Opened in January 2008, it was a modern student accommodation building owned by Unite Students. The rooms were arranged in groups of 3 to 6 within each flat and all had en–suite facilities and three–quarter beds.

=== Mary Morris House ===
Mary Morris House was located on Shire Oak Road, Headingley, close to James Baillie Park and North Hill Court. It had 150 rooms and at least half of the residents were University of Leeds first year students. Some flats had laundry facilities in their own flat; others shared facilities.

=== Oxley Residences ===
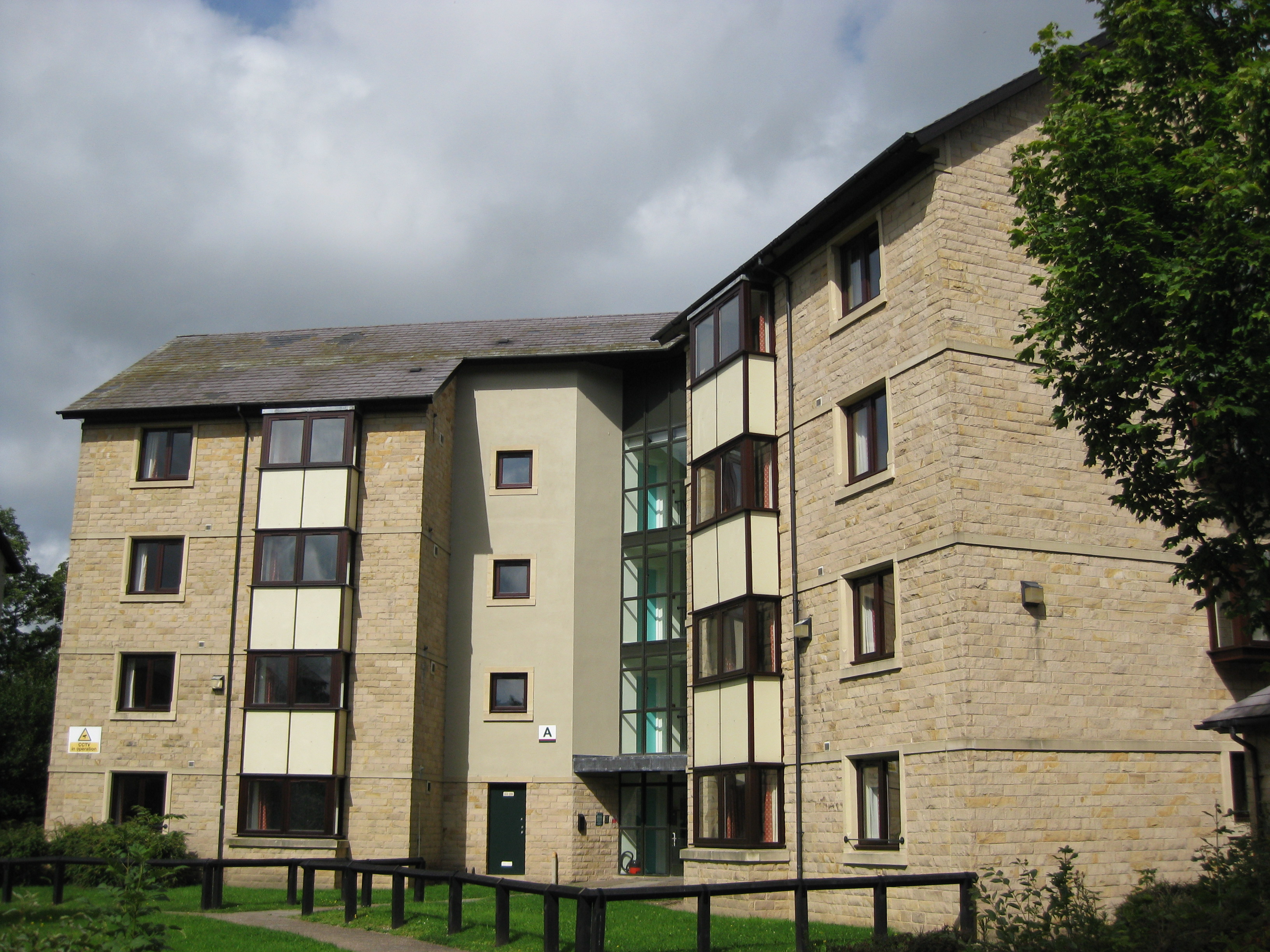
Block A of the Student Flats, Oxley Hall

Oxley Residences (53.8358°N 1.5865°W) were a group of student accommodation buildings situated in Weetwood, Leeds. The residences constituted 12 blocks (A-M, except I) and 2 houses (Oxley House and Bardon Grange). Oxley was approximately 2.5 miles (4.0 km) away from the University of Leeds and 3.5 miles (5.6 km) away from Leeds City Centre. The halls were located close to Weetwood Sports facilities.

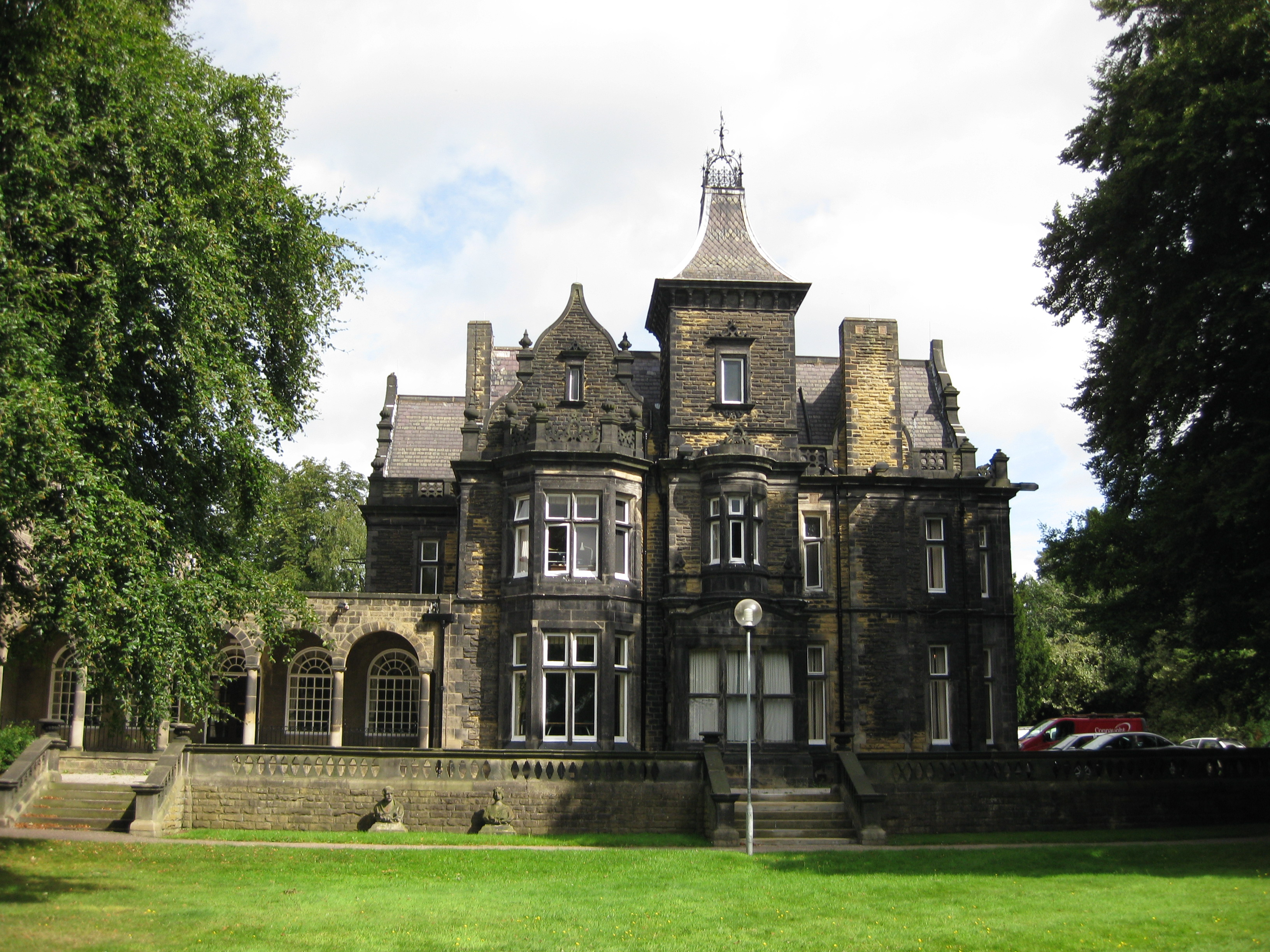
Oxley House

The main building Oxley House was built in 1861 in Gothic revival style for banker Henry Oxley, and then called Weetwood Villa (later The Elms). In 1921 it became Oxley Hall, a hall for women students. Other modern blocks were added. The residences were sold by Leeds University for £16.1 million in 2016, and are now run as private student housing by Allied Students.

=== Sadler Hall ===
In the 1960s and 1970s, under the stewardship of Ernest Kirkby, Sadler Hall, one of the smallest of the university's halls of residence, gained a reputation for folk music and for sword-dancing. In the mid-1980s, a group of undergraduates allegedly started the planned demolition of the building by kicking down the Table Tennis Hut. The Hall was demolished and has been replaced by a small housing estate (centred on Sadler Way, LS16 8NL). The Lodge remains standing on Church Lane.

=== Shimmin ===
Shimmin was a residence hall on the top floor of the Social Sciences building at the University of Leeds. It was able to house 40 students and had bathroom and kitchen facilities shared between each flat with each flat housing around 6 students. Historically, Shimmin was used to house female students but it closed in January 2008.

=== St Marks Residences (old buildings) ===
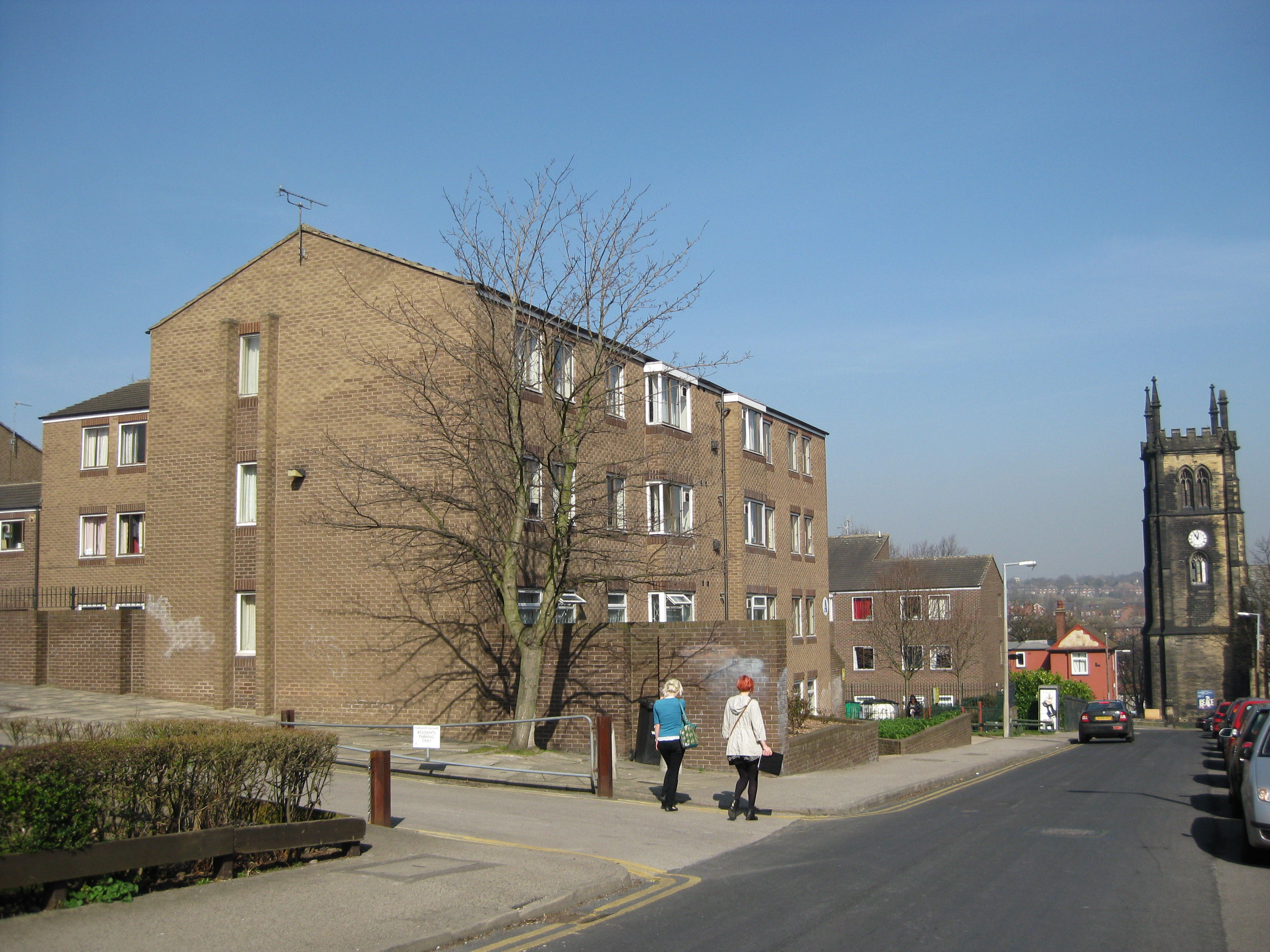
Former St Mark's Residences, St Mark's Street, with St Mark's Church behind

The St. Marks Residences was a 2-minute walk from the Houldsworth Engineering building of Leeds University, close to Woodhouse Moor. It was demolished in 2012 and has now been replaced by new buildings.

=== Tetley Hall ===
Tetley Hall was a catered hall of residence. It housed around 218 students in one main block, composed of two sections, Woodhouse and Heathfield, two listed Victorian buildings, Moorfield Lodge and Moor Grange, and four additional houses, Burton Grange, Burton Lea, the Cottage, and Moor Road House. The site was sold for £8.1 million in 2006 and is no longer used for student housing. The last academic year to live there was 2005–06. In the first term of 2007–08 one of the houses, Moor Road House, was used as temporary accommodation due to the shortage of normal university accommodation.

=== The Tannery ===
The Tannery was a modern student accommodation building on Cavendish Street owned by Unite Students. It was located at the rear of Sentinel towers, approximately 20–minutes walk from the Leeds University campus and 0.6 miles (0.97 km) from the city centre. There were 4 blocks at The Tannery (A-D) around a central courtyard. It had all en-suite rooms with wireless internet, a common room, laundry facilities, cycle storage and Edge Sports Centre membership.

=== Weetwood Hall ===
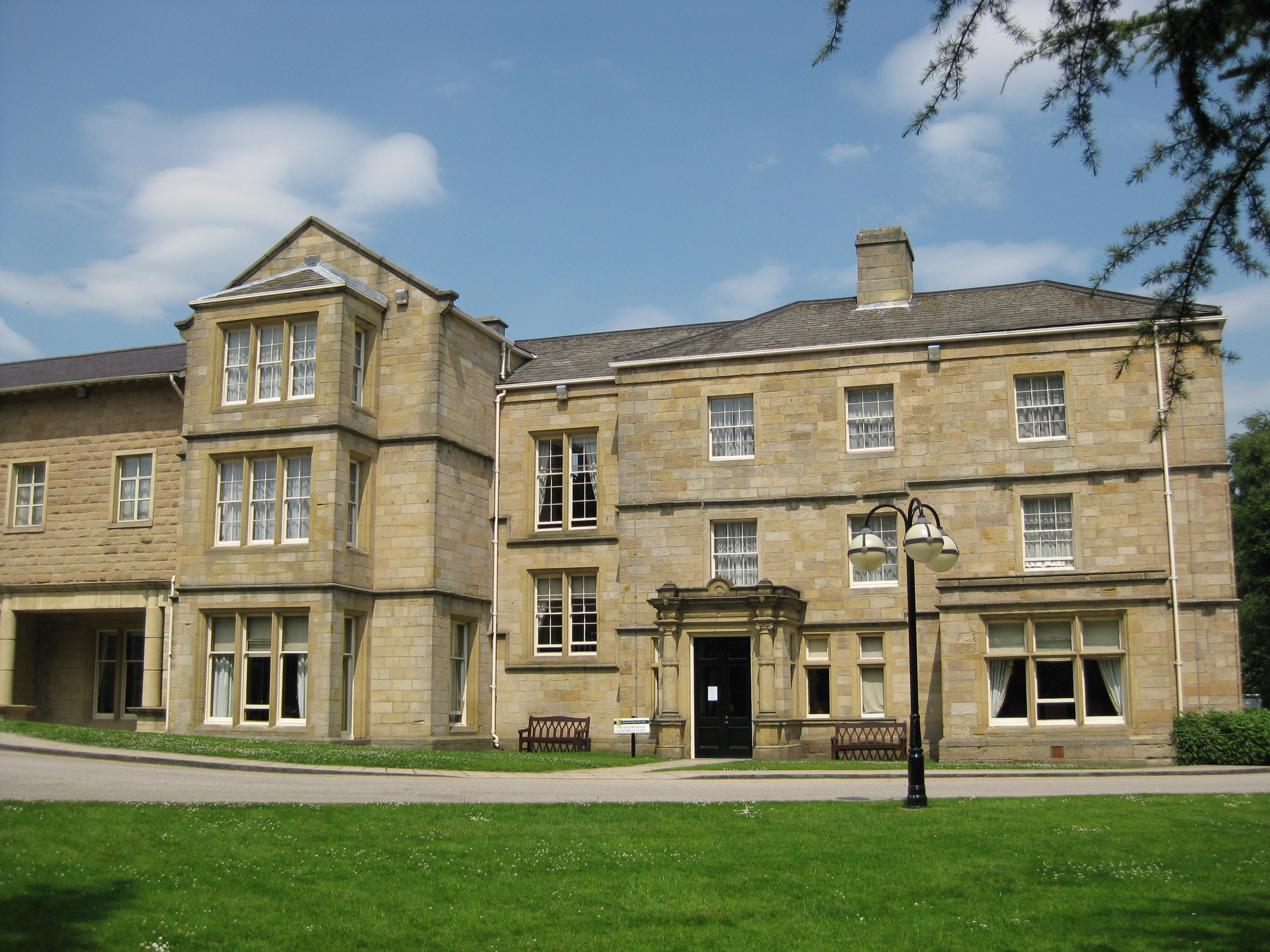
Weetwood Hall

The former University of Leeds hall of residence is now a Hotel and Conference Centre (owned and run by the university). It is located on the junction of the A660 and the Leeds Outer Ring Road.
