= Laws on crossbows =

The crossbow often has a complicated legal status due to its potential use for lethal purposes, and its similarities with both firearms and other archery weapons. The crossbow is, for legal purposes, often categorized as a firearm by various legal jurisdictions (even though it is not considered as a firearm from a technical perspective), despite the fact that no combustion is required to propel the projectile.

This is a list of laws concerning crossbows by country.

In some nations crossbows are not subject to any specific regulation, in most there are laws, which differ widely. Each jurisdiction has its own definition of a crossbow, and in some cases pistol-sized crossbows are treated differently. There may be minimum ages for possession, and sales of both crossbows and bolts may be restricted. Specific rules around hunting use are also common.

Some jurisdictions require permits and background checks similar to those required for firearms.

== Australia ==
Pistol crossbows are strictly controlled in all Australian states due to their concealable nature. Crossbows can be bought and owned by adults over 18 years of age, while in most states crossbows can only be owned with a special licence, for instance for members of an official sporting club. Control on transport of crossbows between states has increased to prevent unauthorised use of imported crossbows.

Recent changes to laws in Western Australia to prohibit crossbow ownership require applications to legally possess a crossbow by July 2, 2011, before they became illegal to possess and sporting usage is only legal for people currently participating in the sport at the date of the laws introduction and does not apply to or allow for new participants thereafter.

== Bulgaria ==
In Bulgaria crossbows are not regulated, but their use for fishing and hunting is explicitly prohibited.

== Canada ==
In Canada, crossbows are not classified as a firearm and can be acquired or manufactured by or sold to anyone over 18 years of age. According to the Criminal Code, barrelled weapons launching a projectile at a muzzle velocity not exceeding 152.4 m/s (500 feet per second) are also not considered firearms. This ensures no licence is required to purchase a crossbow, unless it is barrelled and launches projectiles at a velocity exceeding 152.4 m/s (500 feet per second). Though older PAL cards say that one is allowed to acquire one, the laws designating them as firearms were struck down before they could be implemented. Crossbows designed to be shot with one hand and crossbows measuring less than 500 mm in length are prohibited. Some municipalities also have bylaws prohibiting the discharging and/or possession of firearms within city limits, and those laws usually define bows, crossbows, and slingshots as firearms.

Hunting in Canada is regulated at the provincial level, therefore the legality of crossbow hunting vary from province to province.

== Czech Republic ==
Crossbows and other mechanical weapons with drawing force under 150 N (15 kgf; 35 lbf) are not regulated. Mechanical weapons above this limit are class D weapons, which means they can only be used or owned by a person at least 18 years of age (no license is required) and can't be worn visibly in public. They can only be used at places not accessible to public (without posing a risk to health or property), at licensed shooting ranges and at visibly marked places oversighted by a designated person.

== Denmark ==
In Denmark, the creation, import or possession of crossbows without a license is prohibited by Danish law on weapons (Våbenloven - Bekendtgørelse af lov om våben og eksplosivstoffer), and crossbows are not recognized as legal weapons for hunting.

== Finland ==
In Finland, crossbows are banned for hunting. Possession of crossbows and other bows requires no license. In other legal aspects the crossbow is parallel to an air gun.

== Germany ==
In German law on weapons, crossbows and firearms are equated in their legal status as weapons (WaffG Anlage 1 1.2.2), but in contrast to guns, acquisition, possession, trade or production of crossbows requires no license (WaffG Anlage 2). Because of their definition as weapons, but without further restrictions, any crossbows can be used by minors under custody of competent adults. Fishing and hunting with crossbows is prohibited. As a specialty to be noted is that, crossbows do not shoot as per legal definition in Germany, since they don't use expanding gases or similar mechanisms to propel a projectile.

== Hong Kong ==
In Hong Kong, crossbows with draw weight of more than 6 kg are defined as firearms according to the Firearms and Ammunition Ordinance and the possession of firearms requires a license or a dealer's license issued by the Hong Kong Police Force.

== Ireland ==
In Republic of Ireland law, crossbows are classed as firearms and require a licence to own. Before the Firearms and Offensive Weapons Act 1990 there were no specific regulations on crossbows. The bill as introduced did not restrict crossbows with a draw weight under 1.4 kilograms (3.1 lb), but the limit was deleted at committee stage.

== Japan ==
Since 2022 most civilians are banned from owning crossbows in Japan. Crossbows are regulated by the Firearm and Sword Possession Control Law. The possession of crossbow requires a license from a local public safety commission who are obliged to keep their crossbows in lockers or other appropriate storage facilities. The usage of crossbows is limited to firing ranges, shooting sports and veterinary anesthesia, and individuals who are below the age of 18, have been imprisoned or are drug addicts are not allowed to possess a crossbow. Illegal possession of crossbows can lead to imprisonment of up to three years or a fine of up to ¥500,000.

== Netherlands ==
In the Netherlands crossbows are regulated by the "wet wapens en munitie" (law on weapons and ammunition). Crossbows and crossbow bolts are placed in category 4, along with bows, swords, spears, etc. It is legal to possess weapons from this category providing that the individual is over 18. It is not allowed to carry those weapons in public. When transporting, the weapon should be packaged in a way that one has to perform at least 3 actions before the weapon is ready for use (this does not include the steps required to actually load and fire the weapon). Only on special occasions such as re-enactment events this is not strictly enforced. Crossbows should be used only for collecting, re-enactment or sportive purposes. Hunting with crossbows (or bows) is strictly prohibited in the Netherlands under animal cruelty laws.

== Norway ==
In Norway, crossbows are considered equivalent to firearms, and possession requires a license (Innførsel og utførsel av våpen, Tollvesenet). Hunting with crossbows is not allowed.

== Poland ==
In Poland, crossbows are considered a weapon, same as firearms, and possession requires a license (Dz.U.2024/0/485). Hunting with crossbows is not allowed (Dz.U.2005/61/548).

== Sweden ==
In Sweden, crossbows are considered equivalent to firearms, and possession requires a license. Hunting with crossbows is not allowed. Swedish law dictates that any weapon that stores its energy, i.e., weapons with a firing mechanism, that produces more than 10 J (90 in⋅lb_{f}) at the muzzle are illegal without licence. Thus very weak crossbows are sold in toy stores as well as low powered air rifles (not sold to minors). Sale or possession of normal bows of any strength are regulated in the same way as the previously mentioned weak crossbows and air rifles.

== Turkey ==
According to the Hunting Laws, crossbows are weapons which are manufactured solely for attack and defense, and they are prohibited to import, sell, purchase, carry and possess.

== United Kingdom ==
No licence or registration is required to own a crossbow in the United Kingdom. Under the Crossbows Act 1987, crossbows cannot be bought or sold in England, Wales or Scotland by or to those under 18. Possession is also prohibited by those under 18 years old except under adult supervision. The act states that crossbows may be used by persons under 18 years of age only when supervised by a person aged 21 years old or over. Similar prohibitions for Northern Ireland are made in the Crossbows (Northern Ireland) Order 1988.

Section 5 of the Wildlife and Countryside Act 1981 prevents their use for hunting birds. In Scotland, section 50 of the Civic Government (Scotland) Act 1982 makes it an offence to be drunk in a public place in possession of a crossbow.

Section 44 of the Violent Crime Reduction Act 2006 raised the age limit from 17 to 18 in England and Wales, with effect from 1 October 2007. The Scottish Parliament made similar changes in section 62 of the Custodial Sentences and Weapons (Scotland) Act 2007, also with effect from 1 October 2007. In 2021, after a man trespassed with a crossbow in Windsor Castle, the Home Secretary ordered a review of the law, with the possibility that it could be tightened.

Crime and Policing Act 2026 introduced a "Shane’s Law" that bans the sale of new crossbows and hunting arrows, as well as adds two-step age verification requirements for the remaining legal trade (such as parts or hire for events). Existing owners will be required to obtain a licence in order to keep them. Licensing requirements are expected to resemble corresponding regulations for firearms.

== United States ==
There are no federal regulations prohibiting ownership or sale of crossbows, however several states have implemented restrictions on criteria such as age or criminal status. For example, New York law classifies crossbows as dangerous weapons, thereby prohibiting ownership by convicted felons. Rules regarding hunting with crossbows vary by state.

=== Michigan ===
Any licensed hunter who has obtained a free crossbow stamp can hunt with a crossbow during any season in which a firearm is allowed, for both big and small game, except hunters in the Upper Peninsula may not use a crossbow or a modified bow during the December 1 – January 1 late archery deer season and December 7–16 muzzleloader deer season, unless the hunter is disabled and has a crossbow permit or special permit to take game with a modified bow. Any licensed hunter may use a crossbow throughout the archery deer season in the Lower Peninsula (October 1 – November 14 and December 1 – January 1) and during the early archery deer season in the Upper Peninsula (October 1 – November 14). Crossbow use is not allowed in the Red Oak Unit during the archery-only bear season (October 5–11) except for certified hunters with a disability.

The DNR may issue a crossbow permit or a special permit to take game with a modified bow to a person with a valid hunting license to take a deer during an open deer season, if the person is certified as having permanent or temporary disability, as defined in Wildlife Conservation Order 5.95, which renders a person unable to use conventional archery equipment. Hunters may use a modified bow where crossbows are legal. A modified bow is a bow, other than a crossbow, that has been physically altered so that it may be held, aimed and shot with one arm. When hunting deer, bear, elk and turkey, crossbow hunters must use only arrows, bolts and quarrels with a broadhead hunting type of point not less than 7/8 of an inch (2 cm) wide with a minimum of 14 inches (35 cm) in length. See Hunter Orange Clothing Requirements.

=== New York ===
Hunting with crossbows in New York is legal as of August 2014.
