= Atomwaffen Division =

International neo-Nazi network

- Flag Logo
- Founder: Brandon Russell
- Leader: Brandon Russell (2015–2017); John Cameron Denton (2017–2020)
- Political advisor: James Mason
- Founded: October 12, 2015
- Dissolved: c. July 2020
- Country: United States (country of origin)
- Headquarters: Tampa, Florida, United States (2017)
- Active regions: Worldwide
- Ideology: Neo-Nazism; Militant accelerationism
- Political position: Far-right
- Size: 60–100 full members; and a "large number" of initiates

The Atomwaffen Division (AWD, Atomwaffen meaning "atomic weapons" in German) was an international neo-Nazi paramilitary network active from 2015 to 2020. Founded in the Southern United States by Bahamian American neo-Nazi Brandon Russell, AWD expanded across the US and into several other countries. Since its inception, the group grew to several dozen members, with its main cell being based in Tampa, Florida, while also establishing chapters in at least 23 other US states.

AWD has been listed as a hate group by the Southern Poverty Law Center (SPLC), designated a terrorist group by multiple governments, and considered "one of the most violent neo-Nazi movements in the 21st century". Members of the AWD have been held responsible for a number of murders, bombings, planned terrorist attacks, and other criminal actions, and have also inspired copycat attacks in Buffalo, New York; El Paso, Texas; Jacksonville, Florida; Halle, Germany; San Diego, California; Aracruz, Brazil, and Buenos Aires, Argentina.

== History ==
=== Creation ===
On October 12, 2015, the group's creation was announced by founding leader Brandon Russell, on the neo-fascist and neo-Nazi web forum Iron March, which, prior to its shutdown in 2017, had been linked to several acts of Neo-Nazi terrorism and violent militant groups such as the Nordic Resistance Movement, National Action, CasaPound, and Golden Dawn. In its initial posts, the group described itself as a "very fanatical, ideological band of comrades who do both activism and militant training. Hand to hand, arms training, and various other forms of training. As for activism, we spread awareness in the real world through unconventional means."

=== Membership and training ===
As of 2017, the group's membership was mostly young, and it also recruited new members on university campuses. Its campus recruitment poster campaigns urged students to "Join Your Local Nazis!" and say "The Nazis Are Coming!". It posted recruiting posters at the University of Chicago, the University of Central Florida, Old Dominion University in Norfolk, Virginia, and Boston University. AWD had recruited several veterans and current members of the US Armed Forces who trained the organization's members in the use of firearms and military tactics. A US Navy officer was expelled for allegedly recruiting 12 members for the group and four affiliated US Marines were charged with trafficking and manufacturing firearms for the group. AWD members also sought to train with the Azov Battalion and Russian Imperial Movement. In October 2020, Ukraine deported two AWD members who tried to join Azov for inciting murders and terrorism.

During an investigation in 2018, ProPublica obtained 250,000 encrypted chat logs written by members of the group. It was estimated in early 2018, that AWD had 80 members, while ProPublica estimated as many as 100. According to International Centre for Counter-Terrorism the group has a large number of "initiates" in addition to 60 to 80 full members. At its peak, the organization consisted of 23 different cells across the US.

=== 2017 Tampa shooting and hostage crisis ===
==== Background ====
In early 2017, AWD founder Brandon Russell and fellow member Devon Arthurs moved into Hamptons, a gated community in Tampa, Florida. Arthurs had dropped out of school and was unemployed. Soon afterward, Andrew Oneschuk and Jeremy Himmelman, both members of the AWD, moved into the apartment. According to Arthurs, the apartment served as the "nerve center" of AWD.

Roughly a year before the shooting, Arthurs converted to Islam and revised his Iron March forum profile to align with his adopted "Salafist National Socialist" beliefs. Although he had embraced Islam and faced criticism from fellow members, he maintained his affiliation with AWD.

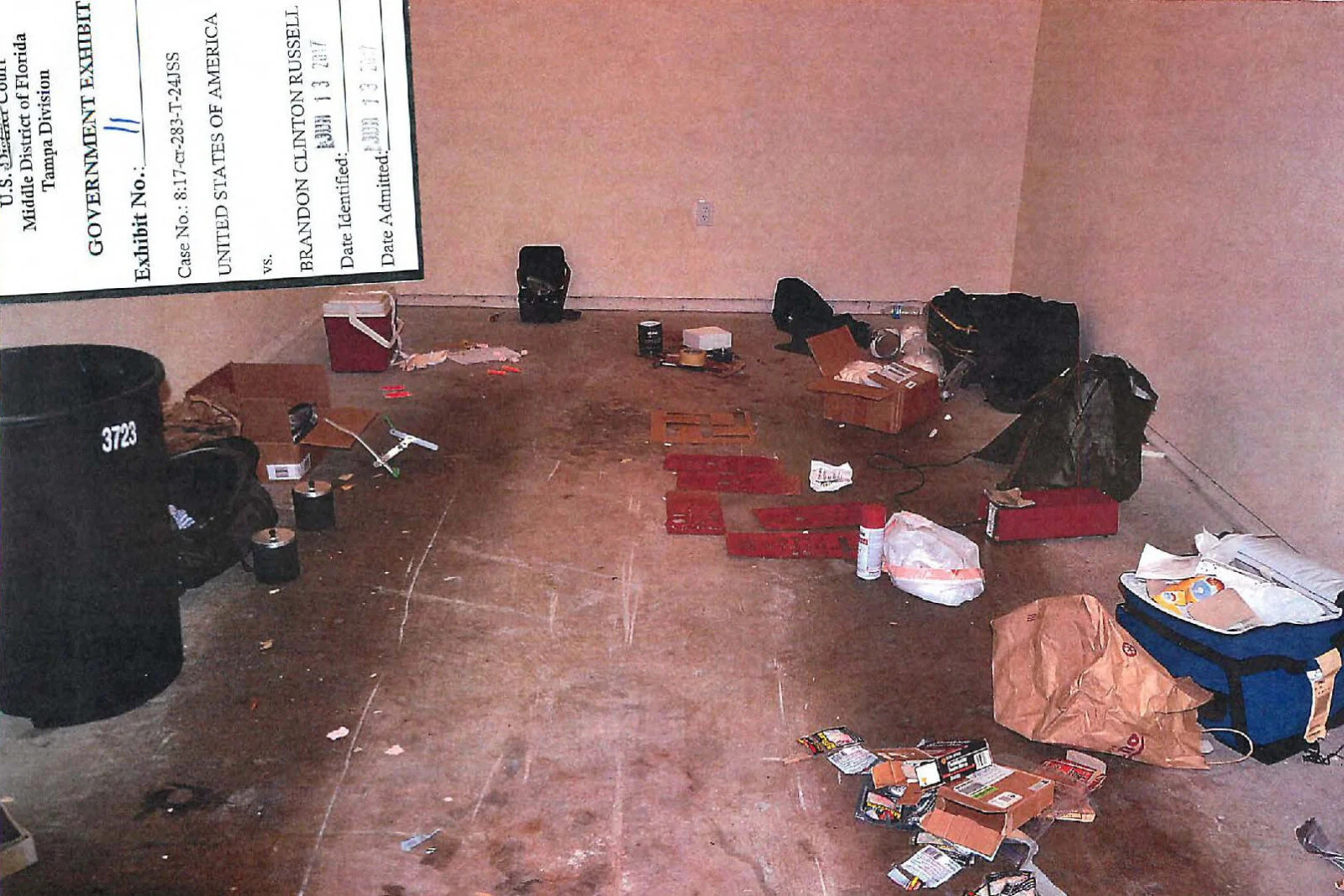
Police and federal agents discovered explosive materials in the garage of the apartment.

==== Shooting and hostage crisis ====
On the evening of 19 May, 2017, AWD member Devon Arthurs, armed with a WASR-10 assault rifle, shot and killed Oneschuk and Himmelman in retaliation for an argument about Arthurs's conversion to Islam. Following the shooting, Arthurs entered a leasing office and announced that he had killed his roommates. The property manager called 911 and watched as Arthurs walked to the nearby Green Planet Smoke Shop, where he entered, brandished a handgun, and held three people hostage. Shortly after the hostage crisis began, officers of the Tampa Police Department arrived at the scene and persuaded Arthurs to surrender. After being taken into custody, he told officers that his roommates would be found dead in the apartment.

The fourth roommate, Russell, founder of the AWD and a member of the Florida National Guard, returned to the apartment following a training exercise. Investigators stated that he was not implicated in the killings. He later admitted to possessing the bomb-making materials recovered from the garage.

=== Satanist influence, decline, and dissolution (2017–2020) ===
Following the 2017 Tampa shooting and hostage crisis, John Cameron Denton assumed leadership of the AWD. Through their shared interests in Nazism and occultism, AWD member John Cameron Denton met Joshua Caleb Sutter, the founder of the esoteric Satanist group the Tempel ov Blood (ToB), a nexion of the Order of Nine Angles (ONA), an organization which advocates rape and human sacrifice. The ToB infiltrated and effectively took over the AWD, beginning in 2017. Denton was close to Sutter and influenced by the ToB and changed the direction of the group to be more similar to the ToB. Denton made Sutter's books required for new initiates and approved them for reading for members. Sutter's influence became controversial among AWD members who despised the Satanic and violent direction the AWD took, which led to several members leaving.

On January 10, 2018, Blaze Bernstein was found dead in a park in Orange County, California, eight days after being reported missing. He was visiting his family in Lake Forest, California, when he was killed. He had been stabbed 28 times. Two days later, Samuel Woodward, a member of AWD, was arrested and charged with murdering Bernstein. As Bernstein was both openly gay and Jewish, authorities declared that he was a victim of a hate crime. Five deaths had links to the AWD over eight months from 2017 to early 2018.

On February 26, 2020, the FBI Joint Terrorism Task Force arrested five senior AWD members in a large operation spanning multiple states. It was claimed that they planned a coordinated operation to intimidate journalists and activists who had tried to expose AWD. Arrested were John Cameron Denton, 26, of Montgomery, Texas; Johnny Garza, 20, of Queen Creek, Arizona; Cameron Shea, 24, of Redmond, Washington; Taylor Parker-Dipeppe, 20, of Spring Hill, Florida; and Kaleb Cole, 24, of Montgomery, Texas. During the arrests, authorities seized knives, firearms, and body armor. The members would visit the apartments of their victims with their faces covered, deface their houses and intimidate them with death threats, including threatening to burn their houses down. Several of the victims moved or went into hiding out of fear for their lives.

On March 14, 2020, American neo-Nazi James Mason, AWD's political advisor, stated that AWD had disbanded, in the same announcement he also denounced the AWD “Fission” breakaway group that released its own propaganda in 2019. However, the group was believed to be on the cusp of being designated as a Foreign Terrorist Organization by the State Department, and the Anti-Defamation League stated that "the move is designed to give members breathing room rather than actually end their militant activities". An intelligence brief distributed by federal law enforcement warned that AWD and its branches had discussed taking advantage of the COVID-19 pandemic. On March 25, 2020, a Missouri man affiliated with AWD allegedly planned to destroy a hospital treating coronavirus victims with a car bomb and died in a shootout with the FBI.

According to counter-terrorism experts, the group remained active and it continued to established affiliates in Europe. On May 31, 2020, it was announced that a new AWD cell had been uncovered in Russia. Local security services had also just previously uncovered a cell in Switzerland, confirming the suspicions of the German officials that Switzerland served as the linchpin of AWD's German operation, allowing them to evade law enforcement. European security officials have asked their US counterparts for assistance in combating these cells and urged designating them as terrorist organizations.

==== Successor organizations ====
According to the Anti-Defamation League, AWD was dissolved in July 2020, and was succeeded by the short-lived National Socialist Order (NSO). In September 2022, a neo-Nazi website and several influential neo-Nazi groups, including The Base, announced that they were severing ties with the NSO, alleging that it had been taken over by the ONA. The website stated that ONA's promotion of Satanism and child sexual abuse was incompatible with its neo-Nazi ideology and claimed that the NSO had ceased to exist. A few days after the NSO's dissolution, several former members subsequently announced the formation of a successor organization, the National Socialist Resistance Front (NSRF). However, some sources attribute the founding of the NSRF to Ryan Hatfield (writing under the pseudonym "Ryan Arthur"), a former AWD cell leader, who is said to have established the group in 2020. Ryan Hatfield later announced on the American Futurist that the NSRF dissolved itself on November 8, 2024.

The National Socialist Order of Nine Angels (NSO9A) was formed in 2022 as the successor to the NSO. The ideological influence of ONA, which had long influenced AWD, remained evident in NSO9A. In March 2023, NSO9A published videos on its website that purported to show attacks carried out by Maniac Murder Cult in 2018 and 2019. It subsequently published a post describing MKU as one of its factions.

=== Post-dissolution events (2020–present) ===
On April 22, 2021, the British government announced its designation of AWD and the NSO as terrorist organizations. Similar actions were undertaken by Canada and Australia, which outlawed local AWD branches in sweeping bans against far-right organizations.

In 2023, Vice and The Guardian reported that former-AWD members have been active "and play key roles" in organizing the Active Club Network, which is a loose association of various neo-Nazi and white supremacist groups. A leading member of the Northern Order, AWD's Canadian branch, Patrick Gordon Macdonald, who has been charged with terrorism offenses, was allegedly also a member of Canadian Active Club. Kristoffer Nippak, another founding member of the Northern Order was also a member of the Active Club. According to the director of the University of New Brunswick's Criminology and Criminal Justice Program, David Hoffman, AWD is using Active Clubs as a cover for organizing where it has been outlawed as a terrorist group.

In February 2023 Russell and a Maryland woman were charged with allegedly conspiring to attack electric substations in the Baltimore area. Russell and Sarah Clendaniel, have been arrested for planning to attack numerous Baltimore electrical substations, aiming to "completely destroy this whole city" in an apparently racially motivated attack. On February 4, 2025, Russell was found guilty of one count of conspiracy to damage an energy facility. On August 7, 2025, Judge James K. Bredar sentenced Russell to the maximum 20 years in prison and a lifetime of supervised release, rejecting arguments that he was less culpable than Clendaniel.

== Ideology ==
The AWD was one of the most notable groups who belong to the militant far-right accelerationist movement popularized by James Mason and the now-defunct Iron March forum. In the context of contemporary neo-fascist politics, far-right accelerationism is a radical approach to societal change which maintains the belief that attempting to achieve such through civilized political activities is ineffective. Instead, it emphasizes using violently terroristic actions (the 'accelerant') to increasingly destabilize a nation until its own government completely loses the ability to maintain fundamental security and development functions. Meanwhile, it is at this point that a revolutionary vanguard party can successfully seize power and rebrand the former democratic government into, in this case, a white ethnostate based upon authoritarian neo-fascist ideals akin to Nazi Germany.

The organization explicitly advocated neo-Nazism, drawing a significant amount of influences from James Mason and his publication Siege, a mid-1980s newsletter of the National Socialist Liberation Front. It was published into a book with the same title that was required reading for all AWD members. Mason, a neo-Nazi and a Holocaust denier who advocates murder and violence in order to destabilize the system, was the main advisor to the group. Key ideological influences on the group included Mason, Joseph Tommasi, William Luther Pierce and Charles Manson.

AWD also drew influences from Nazi esotericism and the occult, and its recommended list of reading materials for aspiring initiates included the works of Savitri Devi and the works of Anton Long, a founding member of the ONA, a British neo-Nazi and a Satanist leader. Some members of the group also sympathized with the Salafi and jihadist forms of Islam. AWD Division's founder, Brandon Russell, is alleged to have described Omar Mateen, who perpetrated the Orlando nightclub shooting and pledged allegiance to the Islamic State (IS), as "a hero". In its propaganda, the group also idolized Osama bin Laden, and it also considered "the culture of martyrdom and insurgency" within al-Qaeda and IS as something which should be emulated. AWD promoted White jihad and has advocated for an alliance with Islamic groups such as Hamas and its Telegram channels have promoted the group. A member of the AWD, Steven Billingsley, was photographed at a vigil in San Antonio, Texas, for the victims of the Orlando shooting, with a skull mask and a sign which read "God Hates Fags", a motto connected to the homophobic Westboro Baptist Church. Although the AWD was anti-communist, it sympathized and promoted North Korean Juche as a model of racial purity and autarky.

In its propaganda videos, AWD burned copies of the US Constitution and flag and advocated for attacks against the federal government of the US, racial minorities, gay people, and Jews. The videos also contained footage of the attacks on said minorities. AWD had engaged in several mass murder plots, plans to cripple public water systems and plans to destroy parts of the continental US power transmission grid. AWD has also been accused of planning to blow up nuclear power stations. The organization's aim was to violently overthrow the federal government of the US via terrorism and guerrilla warfare tactics. Since 2017, the organization had been linked to eight killings and several violent hate crimes in the US, including assaults, rapes and multiple cases of kidnapping and torture. AWD is also responsible for several killings worldwide.

AWD's ideology has inspired copycat attacks in Buffalo, New York; El Paso, Texas; Jacksonville, Florida; Halle, Germany; San Diego, California; Aracruz, Brazil, and Buenos Aires, Argentina.

=== Involvement in local far-right parties ===
Although Atomwaffen's ideology stressed opposition to democracy and parliamentarism, prominent AWD members have also risen to power as prominent members of their local far-right parties. Viljam Nyman of AWD Finland had been member of the Lapland board of the Finns Party, and another Finnish member was a party ideologue, publishing dozens of articles in the Finns party organ. MP Ruuben Kaalep from EKRE was also connected to AWD members and four affiliates of AWD Deutschland were also local politicians of the Alternative for Germany.

== International branches ==
The AWD had branches, chapters, or cells in several countries, including Argentina, Australia, Brazil, Bulgaria, Canada, Croatia, Estonia, Finland, France, Germany, Ireland, Italy, Latvia, Lithuania, the Netherlands, Russia, Spain and Ukraine.

=== Sonnenkrieg Division (United Kingdom and Europe) ===
The Sonnenkrieg Division (SKD, /ˈzɒnənˌkriːɡ/; Sonnenkrieg being German for "Sun War") was a militant accelerationist organization that was active in the United Kingdom and the Netherlands from 2018 to 2020. Neo-Nazi Andrew Dymock founded SKD in 2018 and led the group until it was dissolved in 2020. SKD was linked to the AWD, and maintained its links by e-mail, chat room discussion, using similar names and distributing similar propaganda. The group was thought to have had 10 to 15 members in the UK and Europe, and some suspected members were thought to have been involved in a previous neo-Nazi group, the National Action's System Resistance Network, which was linked to various acts of racial violence and arson in the UK.

Police arrested three suspected members of the Sonnenkrieg Division in early December 2018 as part of an "ongoing investigation into extreme right-wing activity". MI5, the British domestic intelligence agency, took the lead in the government's monitoring of far-right terrorism. On June 18, 2019, Sonnenkrieg members Dunn-Koczorowski and Michal Szewczuk, 19, were jailed for terrorism offenses. According to the prosecutor the men promoted "engaging in a "total attack" on the system", Dunn-Koczorowski having proclaimed "terror is the best political weapon for nothing drives people harder than a fear of sudden death" and were intent on action. Furthermore, the group was influenced by James Mason who "may well represent the most violent, revolutionary and potentially terroristic expression of right-wing extremism current today". Dunn-Koczorowski was sentenced to 18 months in prison for encouraging terrorism, and Szewczuk was sentenced to four years in prison for encouraging terrorism and possessing documents that are useful to a terrorist, such as bomb-making instructions.

Hope not Hate's annual "State of hate" report concluded the Sonnenkrieg Division had been influenced by the ONA and it was more extreme and potentially more violent than National Action. Within the "State of hate" report: "some members have also carried out some of these satanic fantasies and allegations of rape and imprisonment against their own members are circulating." Sonnenkrieg Division members had shared videos of one female supporter being tortured and scored with a knife by one of the group's male members. The private messages which belonged to Sonnenkrieg Division and were acquired by the police included footage of the members of the group abusing women, such as images of the rape of a woman, who had a swastika and runes cut into her flesh.

On February 20, 2019, Jacek Tchorzewski, 18, was stopped by the counter-terrorism unit at Luton Airport. He was arrested on suspicion of terror offenses, and the police uncovered "an enormous amount" of manuals on how to make weapons and explosives and Nazi propaganda. In court, it was heard Tchorzewski had said it was "his dream" to commit a terrorist attack and he intended to smuggle firearms and explosives from Germany for this purpose. Also presented was a notebook from his prison cell where he had written, "Let's fill our hearts with terror and London's streets with blood." Commander Richard Smith, the head of the counter terrorism unit, said that Tchorzewski was connected to the Sonnenkrieg Division. Judge Anuja Dhir said Tchorzewski was a "deeply entrenched neo-Nazi with an interest in Satanism and occult practices" and an "offender of particular concern". On September 20, 2019, Tchorzewski was sentenced to four years imprisonment for terrorism offenses at the Old Bailey.

On December 4, 2019, Andrew Dymock was arrested and charged with 15 terror offenses, including encouraging terrorism and raising funds for a terrorist group. He was first arrested in June 2018 at Gatwick Airport on his way to the US. Dymock was questioned over alleged sexual offenses against a teenage girl, in connection to the earlier assaults on women. He was convicted on all counts on June 12, 2021, and sentenced to seven years' imprisonment on July 21, 2021.

15 year old Rhianan Rudd allegedly planned blowing up a synagogue and was arrested in October 2020 in the United Kingdom. The Home Office dropped the charges after concluding "she had been a victim of trafficking who had been groomed and sexually exploited." Rudd was allegedly radicalized by AWD and ONA. She died by suicide on May 19, 2022.

In February 2020, Sonnenkrieg Division became the second far-right group to be banned as a terrorist organization after National Action.

On September 2, 2020, Harry Vaughan pleaded guilty to 14 terrorism offenses and possession of child pornography. Vaughan was connected to both National Action and Sonnenkrieg Division. A police search of his house uncovered child pornography, documents showing how to build bombs and detonators, and "satanic, neo-Nazi" ONA books advising rape and murder. In addition to this, he was described at the Old Bailey as a firearms enthusiast living with his two young sisters at the time of the arrest. In June 2023, Vaughan pleaded guilty to new charges for his production of child pornography.

On March 2, 2021, the Australian home affairs minister, Peter Dutton, accepted an Australian Security Intelligence Organisation (ASIO) recommendation to label Sonnenkrieg Division a "terrorist organisation", citing their reach into Australia. The Sonnenkrieg Division was officially proscribed in Australia on March 22, 2021.

A Buckinghamshire man planned to attack his Jewish neighbors and broadcast it live in December 2022. High Wycombe Youth Court ordered him to take part in a two-year rehabilitation program in 2023. It was reported by the Economist that British AWD members took part in the 2024 United Kingdom riots. Telegram channels linked to AWD also "co-ordinated promotion and planning of riots".

It was added to the UK's list of Proscribed terrorist groups or organizations in 2021, an order which also contained its NSO name.

=== Germany (AWD Deutschland) ===
On June 1, 2018, in a video in German and English titled AWD Deutschland: Die Messer werden schon gewetzet ("AWD Germany: The knives are already being sharpened"), the group announced the establishment of a cell or branch in Germany, followed by the promise of a "long fight". The group's flyers were spotted in Berlin, targeting students. In June 2019, AWD propaganda was discovered in a Turkish neighborhood in Cologne that had been the site of a nail bomb attack motivated by ethnic hatred in 2004, threatening further similar attacks.

In November 2018, an unnamed American activist who had emigrated to Germany for safety reasons due to threats from AWD received a call from the Federal Criminal Police Office to urgently come to authorities. AWD members had traveled to Germany and the police believed they were in imminent danger of being murdered by the group based on a tip from the FBI.

In October 2019, people claiming to be members of the organization sent death threats to German politicians Cem Özdemir and Claudia Roth. "At the moment, we are planning how and when we will execute you; At the next public rally? Or will we get you in front of your home?" read part of the message sent to the office of Özdemir, who has Circassian roots. The death threats were condemned by Angela Merkel, and Interior Ministry spokesman Steve Alter commented the security services have "already had this group in their sights for some time".

German T-Online managed to uncover the identity of one of the members of the group, who is referred to as "A" to comply with German privacy laws. "A" had previously instructed people on a now-defunct website how to handle chemicals and how to make the explosive HMTD. He also has a conviction for illegal possession of armor. According to the article "A" is also experienced in martial arts and his social media shows him practicing with guns. The group has a house for meetings somewhere in Eisenach in Thuringia.

On February 5, 2020, a 22-year-old member was arrested in a Bavarian town near the Czech border and several firearms were confiscated from him. He was investigated on suspicion of preparing a terrorist attack. According to the German police the man had announced his intention of "martyring" himself in an attack against their "enemies" to other members of the group. In addition to this he allegedly instructed others how to procure and smuggle illegal firearms.

In September 2021, a 20-year-old, Marvin E., from the northern Hessian town of Spangenberg, was arrested on suspicion of terrorism. The investigators found 600 self-made explosive devices belonging to him. According to the investigators the man had been in contact with the AWD. On May 8, 2023, Marvin E. was found guilty of forming a local chapter of AWD in Hesse, building explosives, procuring firearms and planning attacks with them, he was sentenced to 3 years and 10 months in prison.

In April 2022, hundreds of police officers in eleven federal states took action against suspected members of the "AWD". Among the 50 accused members was a Bundeswehr sergeant. Kalashnikov rifles and gold bars were confiscated in the raids in addition to money and ammunition.

After months of observation, the police took action in Potsdam on June 3, 2022, and arrested a 17-year-old neo-Nazi said to have prepared right-wing terrorist attacks. The teen was said to have obtained instructions for the construction of weapons, ammunition and explosive devices and chemicals for the construction of explosive devices, as well as having built explosive devices and incendiary devices himself and carried out initial explosive tests. According to the investigators, findings in his house and business premises confirmed the suspicion. The Brandenburg Public Prosecutor's Office initiated proceedings on suspicion of preparing a serious act of violence that is dangerous to the state, violating the explosives law and using signs of unconstitutional organizations.

On October 4, 2022, the trial of Maurice P. begun. Maurice was an alleged AWD member and was charged with attempted murder for cutting the throat of a Jamaican man, barely missing the carotid artery.

In November 2024, 450 German, Austrian and Polish police raided 20 properties and arrested members of an AWD-affiliated group. Kurt Hättasch, Kevin Richter and Hans-Georg Pförtsch, who were arrested in the raids, were members of the extremist right party Alternative for Germany (AfD). The cell leader of the group Jörg Schimanek was also involved in the illegal sale of Kalashnikovs, silencers and ammunition.

==== AWD Europe ====
AWD Europe was a subgroup for Ukrainians and Poles affiliated with the Germans. One of the leaders of the group was Patrick G. who was connected to far-right music label Neuer Deutscher Standard and far-right fashion brand Isegrim Clothing. The Polish police raided the apartment of a member and uncovered Nazi memorabilia and expensive body armor. According to an investigation by German Amadeu Antonio Foundation published on April 19, 2021, the members were acquiring Uzi submachine guns and had attended Azov training camps in Ukraine.

=== Canada (Northern Order) ===
The group also had a presence in Canada via an affiliated organization called Northern Order that included members of the Canadian Armed Forces. Members of the group had also been known to attend the AWD training camps in the US. One of the pseudonymous individuals found to be part of the group was a 21-year-old "Dark Foreigner" who created propaganda for AWD. The group celebrated the anniversary of the Quebec City mosque shooting by defacing Canadian mosques with neo-Nazi slogans. Gunfire was also reported outside a defaced mosque in Ottawa.

A neo-Nazi affiliated with AWD serving in the Royal Canadian Navy was discovered to be selling handguns, assault rifles, grenades and RPG-7s from the Balkans to French neo-Nazis in Marseille. The man was discovered to be connected to Serbian Combat 18 and to another local neo-Nazi gang, "MC Srbi". It was confirmed the man had traveled to at least half a dozen cities in the Balkans to meet with his contacts and to procure firearms.

Master Corporal Patrik Jordan Mathews, 26, a trained explosives expert, was among the Canadian Armed Forces members accused of being connected to the group and recruiting for it. He was also accused of being affiliated with The Base. In August 2019, two days after being outed by the Winnipeg Free Press as a neo-Nazi recruiter, his truck was found abandoned near the border and it was suspected he was smuggled across the border and had gone underground in the US. Mathews was arrested in Maryland by the FBI in January 2020. Also arrested were two other members of the group accompanying him: 33-year-old Brian Lemley Jr, a US Army veteran, and 19-year-old William Bilbrough IV. According to the affidavit the men were building assault rifles and manufacturing the psychedelic drug DMT for occult rituals. They also possessed body armor, a machine gun and in excess of 1600 rounds of ammunition. They faced a maximum sentence of 50 years for firearm offenses, including transporting a machine gun and transporting a firearm and ammunition with intent to commit a felony. Mathews and Lemley were each sentenced to nine years in prison after pleading guilty. Bilbrough was sentenced to five years.

According to the law enforcement officials the men had planned opening fire from multiple positions on the upcoming 2020 VCDL Lobby Day rally. Bilbrough had also previously talked about fighting with the Azov Battalion. Mathews had instructed others to "Derail some fucking trains, kill some people and poison some water supplies ... If you want the white race to survive, you're going to have to do your fucking part." Lemley told that he could not wait and was excited "to claim my first kill", and said they could ambush and kill police officers and steal their equipment.

Another Canadian neo-Nazi attempted to cross the US border a few months after Mathews in November 2019, but was detained by the US Customs and Border Protection's Tactical Terrorism Response Team. It discovered an assault rifle, a shotgun and a pistol and a large amount of AWD propaganda. According to a Federal Bureau of Investigation affidavit, the man was going to meet American neo-Nazis with whom he had discussed attacking electrical sub-stations to cause power outages.

On September 18, 2020, Toronto Police arrested 34-year-old Guilherme "William" Von Neutegem and charged him with the murder of Mohamed-Aslim Zafis. Zafis was the caretaker of a local mosque who was found dead with his throat cut. The Toronto Police Service said the killing was possibly connected to the stabbing murder of Rampreet Singh a few days prior a short distance from the spot where Zafis' murder took place. Von Neutegem was a member of the ONA and social media accounts established as belonging to him promote the group and included recordings of Von Neutegem performing satanic chants. In his home there was also an altar with the symbol of the ONA adorning a monolith. According to Evan Balgord of the Canadian Anti-Hate Network, they were aware of more ONA members in Canada and their affiliated organization Northern Order.

Canadian Armed Forces launched an internal investigation in October 2020 after a special forces soldier with the CJIRU was identified as a member of the Northern Order and ONA. According to the SPLC, the man was among "some pretty well-known, high-up people in these organizations" and an acquaintance of Mathews and Mason.

The group was designated as a terrorist organization on February 3, 2021.

In May 2022, RCMP laid terrorism charge against Seth Bertrand of Ontario over alleged links to AWD. He was also charged with vandalizing a transgender center. In June 2022 the RCMP raided houses in St-Ferdinand and Plessisville in rural Quebec allegedly connected AWD. La Presse subsequently reported the raids were related to an AWD training camp in an old school building in Victoriaville. Member of the Northern Order Patrick Gordon Macdonald was arrested on July 5, 2023, by the Canadian Police and charged with participating in a terrorist group, facilitating terrorist activity, and commission of an offense for a terrorist group.

On December 8, 2023, two Ontario men Kristoffer Nippak and Matthew Althorpe were charged with making propaganda for AWD and membership in a terrorist group. On October 30, 2024, a Canadian AWD member named Alexander Moucka was arrested. Moucka is alleged to have hacked the customer information from 160 companies and extorting them with it. AT&T alone paid $370,000 to get the stolen information removed.

=== Feuerkrieg Division ===
Flag of the Feuerkrieg Division

In October 2018, a group which was modeled after AWD and called itself the Feuerkrieg Division (German for "Fire War Division") was established in the Baltic states, most likely in Saaremaa, Estonia where several members of its leadership resided. The FKD operated in more than 12 countries, before it allegedly dissolved in 2020, and again resurfacing later. In mid-2019, the Feuerkrieg gained attention when it issued death threats against Belgian MEP Guy Verhofstadt and YouTube CEO Susan Wojcicki. It had previously praised the actions of Dylann Roof, Robert Bowers, Timothy McVeigh and Brenton Harrison Tarrant, and encouraged violence against government authorities, Jews, LGBTQ people, leftists and feminists. Propaganda videos produced by the group showed its members building and detonating homemade explosive devices in Estonia. Feuerkrieg also shared a video among its members that instructs how to make TATP bombs, used by ISIS in the Manchester Arena bombing. On June 13, 2019, Feuerkrieg Division announced their presence in Ireland and encouraged people in the United Kingdom, the US, Canada and Germany to join the intercontinental network. Later that year the Bundespolizei announced it had deported a member of the AWD network to Ireland for his role in a murder plot.

According to Eesti Rahvusringhääling, an investigation revealed that Estonian MP Ruuben Kaalep (EKRE) was connected to British neo-Nazi terrorists from the former National Action who went on to form the British branch of the AWD, which subsequently opened a branch in Kaalep's native Estonia in the form of the Feuerkrieg Division. ADL and Hope not Hate also confirmed that American and English Nazis and Azov members had visited Tallinn multiple times, organizing events with Kaalep and Feuerkrieg "which began in early 2019, originally organized with Sonnenkrieg" before becoming a full-fledged branch. The Finnish Resistance Movement and its successor AWD Finland cooperated with the group as well. Kaalep was also found to have been organizing firearms training with pistols and assault rifles to groups of youths recruited from Blue Awakening, some of whom wore skull masks associated with AWD and were shown doing Nazi salutes. Kaalep had said that they are ready for armed combat and the collapse of law and order. The Estonian Internal Security Service had earlier expressed its concern over his events.

On September 2, 2019, the British police arrested a 16-year-old Feuerkrieg member for plotting a mass shooting and arson attacks. The army cadet had professed his admiration for Adolf Hitler and James Mason. Prosecutor Michelle Nelson said he adhered to "occult Nazism" and satanism. He had also allegedly surveyed the synagogues in the Durham area in preparation for the attack and talked with another man about buying a gun from him. He also tried to obtain a dangerous chemical from his neo-Nazi friend. The boy wrote in his journal how he needed to "shed empathy" in preparation for the attack. The group published the addresses of the force's station buildings, custody suites and training centers in retaliation and encouraged its members and sympathizers to kill West Midlands Chief Constable Dave Thompson. It was added that all police are "race traitors" and that police stations should be "considered high value targets to any local NS [National Socialist]". On November 20, 2019, he was found guilty of preparing a terrorist attack and several other terror offenses and was awaiting sentencing in custody. In addition to the terror offenses, he was charged with sexually assaulting a 12-year-old girl. He was eventually convicted of five sexual assaults in addition to the terror offenses.

On October 8, 2019, Feuerkrieg Division took responsibility for the unsuccessful bombing of Western Union offices on the Balčikonis street in Vilnius, Lithuania, posting footage of the bomb being constructed and stated that "Our threats are not empty". Nazi symbols were also spray painted on the building. The next day, a 21-year-old Luke Hunter appeared in court in London charged with terror offenses, allegedly having supported the Feuerkrieg Division and encouraged the mass murder of Jews, non-white people and homosexuals. In December 2020 he was sentenced to four years in prison. Subsequently, a 21-year-old Lithuanian named Gediminas Beržinskas was arrested and charged with the bombing and Lithuanian police removed a large quantity of explosives and firearms from his apartment. It was also revealed that his gang had previously been charged with the brutal beating and sexual assault of a teenage girl. The Estonian Internal Security Service also stated that their operation had stopped a similar bombing from taking place in Estonia by another member of Feuerkrieg Division.

On January 16, 2020, a 22-year-old Latvian named Arturs Aispurs was charged with preparing an act of terrorism for building a bomb he was planning to detonate in a crowd of "Muslims and foreigners" during the New Year's Eve celebration in Helsinki. During the search of his apartment the police found a large amount of propaganda in his possession linking him to the neo-Nazi network. In response, Feuerkrieg Division announced that it was ceasing its public activities. However, according to an investigation by Der Spiegel into firearm smuggling from the Balkans and Eastern Europe to Germany by AWD, the purported halt of activities was a ruse targeted at law enforcement, and that the group was still very much active.

According to Eesti Ekspress, Estonian Internal Security Service detained a local teenager alleged to be one of the leaders and recruiters for the group, operating under the nickname "Commander" or "Kriegsherr" ("Warlord"). He had instructed others how to build bombs, spoke about planning attacks and encouraged members to take part in the paramilitary training. However, the authorities could not legally arrest him due to his minor status, and being not criminally liable. His alleged status in the group was also disputed by Eesti Ekspress. In a published picture, the boy can be seen wearing a skull mask and holding a pistol, taking part in the firearms training organized by Kaalep, who is also believed to have taken part in the group's chats under the pseudonym "Kert Valter".

In the United Kingdom, the Home Office announced on July 13, 2020, that it has designated the Feuerkrieg Division as a terrorist organization and the designation came into effect on July 17. In addition John Mann, Baron Mann proposed "discussions with Estonian ministerial counterparts, given that the FKD and the Sonnenkrieg Division appear to have strong Estonian links ... to see what we can learn about the reason for the growth in such organisations in the Baltics".

On September 2, 2020, Paul Dunleavy from Warwickshire appeared in Birmingham Crown Court, charged with preparing an act of terrorism. He had allegedly stated he was getting armed and in shape for a mass shooting to "provoke a race war", having acquired a handgun and ammunition for this purpose. He was found guilty on October 2, 2020, and was jailed for five years and six months. On February 1, 2021, a Cornish teenager said to have been the leader of the UK branch of the Feuerkrieg Division pleaded guilty to 12 terrorism offenses, making him one of Britain's youngest convicted terrorists. Police had previously raided his home in 2019 for firearms and had found bomb building instructions and ONA literature. Luca Benincasa was sentenced to nine years and three months at Winchester Crown Court in January 2023. He had instructions on bomb making and was a recruiter and "prominent member" of the Feuerkrieg Division and ONA. He pleaded guilty to terrorism offenses and possession of child porn.

Swedish-Estonian NRM member Oskar Laas was deported to Estonia from Sweden in 2021 as a threat to national security for his extremist views. Laas' father was a founder of the local department of the EKRE and took part in NRM demonstrations, as did the younger Laas with another Estonian friend. Laas had taken pictures with his friend in face masks holding the book Siege, and attended events of Blue Awakening and AWD in Estonia.

In May 2023, a large-scale operation took place across Austria where 10 people accused of being affiliated with Feuerkrieg were raided and arrested. The police also confiscated multiple firearms and Nazi paraphernalia. A Viennese man was accused of building bombs and calling for terrorist attacks.

In July 2024, a leader of the Eastern European Accelerationist group Maniac Murder Cult (MKU), Michail "Butcher" Chkhikvishvili, native of Georgia, was arrested and is facing 50 years in prison for a plot to poison Jewish people. Under him MKU co-operated with the Feuerkrieg Division. On July 1, 2024, an Austrian 21-year-old member of the Feuerkrieg was sentenced to two years in prison for among other things, membership in a criminal organization. During a house search in May 2023, firearms and bulletproof vests were confiscated from his apartment. In Feuerkrieg chats he talked about attacking Jewish people and Muslims with poison gas and explosives. At the same time he was employed as a guard at Jewish institutions and was issued a firearm. However, he was intercepted by the police before he could carry out his plans.

On January 21, 2025 Harju Court in Estonia convicted three Feuerkrieg Division members for membership in and recruiting for a terrorist organization.

=== Russia (AWD Russland) ===
On May 31, 2020, the group announced the formation of a new cell in Russia. It received military training from the Russian Imperial Movement, designated a terrorist organization by the US State Department. US citizens affiliated with the group were also believed to have taken part. Leader of the AWD Kaleb Cole was one of the Americans who were trained by RIM. The ties between AWD and RIM reached back to 2015 when Brandon Russell met with the leadership of RIM. Groups of AWD members trained in RIM's facilities at least around 2018 and 2020 according to the Center on Terrorism, Extremism and Counterterrorism and there was some "overlap" between the groups.

BBC News Russian investigation managed to identify some of the members of the group. Some had previously been active in the banned National Socialist Society whose members committed 27 hate crime murders and decapitated a police informant. The members published a Russian language translation of Brenton Tarrant's accelerationist manifesto. A copy of the book was found in the apartment of Yevgeny Manyurov who was allegedly inspired by it to shoot and kill multiple Federal Security Service agents in the Moscow FSB headquarters. The cell maintained contact with the rest of the AWD network and affiliated militants in Ukrainian Galicia. In July 2020 Security Service of Ukraine conducted a raid against allegedly affiliated neo-Nazis in Kyiv who operated printing presses and sold printed versions of the manifesto and other Nazi literature. Another raid was conducted against a group of neo-Nazis in Odesa planning to burn down a synagogue. Firearms were seized in the raids. According to the Security Service of Ukraine both of these operations were masterminded by men from Russia.

As is the case elsewhere, AWD Russland was connected to the Russian ONA chapter. The group is tied to numerous crimes, including murder, burning down a church, sexual assaults, child prostitution, possession of occult extremist material and incitement to murder due to religious and racial hatred. Multiple members have been arrested and one was sent to involuntary psychiatric treatment. On August 20, 2021, four ONA members were arrested for satanic ritual murders in Karelia and St. Petersburg. Two of them are also accused of large-scale drug trafficking as a large amount of narcotics was found in their home. In October 2021 an AWD cell in Buryatia was arrested for having planned attacks against the government and migrants. The police seized firearms, explosives and Nazi paraphernalia from their hideout in Ulan-Ude. Siege was banned as "extremist material" in response to AWD's activities in Russia.

AWD Russland was part of a coalition of neo-Nazi groups taking part in Russian invasion of Ukraine consisting of Russian ONA, Rusich Group and Russian Imperial Movement, with some overlap.

=== Italy (Nuovo Ordine Sociale) ===
Already previously active in the Italian speaking Switzerland, by 2021, AWD had a full-fledged chapter in Italy with 38 members, formed in Savona. The group was called Nuovo Ordine Sociale or New Social Order in English. On January 22, 2021, the police arrested a 22 year old leader named Andrea Cavalleri in Savona and searched the houses of 12 other members in Genoa, Turin, Cagliari, Forlì-Cesena, Palermo, Perugia, Bologna and Cuneo in an anti-terrorism operation. Various firearms were seized. Cavalleri was suspected, among other things, of preparing to commit a mass shooting and the police believe they foiled an attack. Ten rifles and three pistols were confiscated from his house. According to investigators he also had published and distributed propaganda inciting a revolution against "Zionist Occupation Government" and extermination of the Jewish people and "race traitors". Cavalleri also allegedly encouraged people to commit mass murder attacks like Anders Breivik and Brenton Tarrant and rape and kill enemies of the group. He was charged with forming a terrorist organization and incitement to criminal actions motivated by racial hatred. The NOS described itself as "A special unit of National Socialist revolutionaries" which "only welcomes warriors ready to die" and has "race war as its main purpose".

On December 27, 2021, five Italian AWD leaders were arrested and searches were conducted in Pordenone, Brindisi, Milan, Turin, Ferrara, Modena, Verona and Bologna. Nazi propaganda and weapons were confiscated during the raids. The arrested leaders are suspected of distributing information on explosives. On February 5, 2024, 24-year-old Luigi Antonio Pennelli was sentenced to 5 years in prison for "apologia and recruiting for Nazism". Pennelli had joined AWD two years prior.

On December 4, 2024, in Bologna 25 houses belonging to the members of a splinter group of the Italian AWD "Nuovo Ordine Sociale-Sole Nero" (New Social Order-Black Sun) or "Werwolf Division" were raided and members were arrested for plotting to murder Giorgia Meloni and possessing illegal firearms. According to Il Giornale the group was connected to jihadi terrorists. Allegedly a man from Bologna volunteered to fight in the Palestinian group Lions' Den and returned to Italy, and a Palestinian PLO member Zyad Abu Saleh built explosives for the group.

=== Finland (AWD Finland) ===
AWD Finland "Siitoin Squadron" (AWDSS) was formed after the ban of the Nordic Resistance Movement (NRM) in 2019, following members of the underground group embracing accelerationism and occultism. Named after Pekka Siitoin, the AWDSS was announced on September 15, 2021, the anniversary of the adoption of the swastika flag and the Nuremberg laws in Germany, with footage of members holding assault rifles. However, the group had already been active long before the announcement, and a few of their members had previously been exposed by antifascist activists. The former NRM accelerationists had been active temporarily as Kansallissosialistinuoret (Finnish for 'National Socialist Youth') prior to the formation of the AWDSS. AWDSS also maintained particularly close relations with the Feuerkrieg Division in neighboring Estonia. According to an investigation by Yleisradio, two thirds of the known members who were previously involved with NRM or Soldiers of Odin had a conviction for a violent crime, and multiple have been convicted of murder. In their private chats Finnish AWD members talked about raping political enemies and publish videos of firearms training.

AWDSS was connected to and shared membership with Finnish ONA nexions. Finnish MP Vilhelm Junnila quoted a newspaper article about AWD that the nationally active group should be added to the list of proscribed organizations. In September 2021, Save the Children foundation warned that extreme movements like the NRM splinters were grooming and recruiting children in Finland. Five Finns were previously arrested for sexually abusing multiple children, and according to the police the activities involved "Nazism and satanism" and consumption of methamphetamine. On September 25, 2021, AWD members assaulted antifascist counterdemonstrators to a Nazi demonstration in Helsinki and were arrested by the police at the scene. AWD and Finnish lodge of the Black Order also formed a border patrol militia in co-operation, recruiting former military police. According to Seura magazine, some members had previously served in the Azov Battalion. In addition to Azov, the Russian Imperial Movement had also provided paramilitary training to the Finnish neo-Nazis. Finnish neo-Nazis have been recruited for the war in Ukraine by local far-right pro-Russian parties.

On December 4, 2021, the Finnish police arrested a five-man cell in Kankaanpää on suspicion of planning a terror attack and confiscated numerous firearms, including assault rifles, forty kilos of explosives and hundreds of liters of explosive precursors. According to the Finnish media, the men were part of AWD Finland. Further, they adhered to the ideology of accelerationism and ONA satanism. The men are suspected of having planned to blow up a refugee center in Niinisalo for which they had acquired explosives, and the men are suspected of homophobic assaults and arson of another refugee center. In July 2023, the Finnish police arrested five men in Lahti who possessed assault rifles and adhered to accelerationism and Siege and planned to ignite a race war by attacking the infrastructure, electric grid and railroads. The men discussed forming a new AWD cell, and discussed assassinating Prime minister Sanna Marin. It was reported the men had at least planned training in Russia, and had met with Janus Putkonen. Later multiple sources confirmed the men had acquired training for the use of firearms and explosives. Additionally the group committed burglaries against left-wing targets. On October 31, 2023, the men from Lahti were convicted of terrorism offenses. A 29-year old Viljam Nyman was sentenced to 3 years and 4 months. A man born in 2001 was sentenced to 7 months of probation and another man born in 1996 was sentenced to 1 year and 9 months. The fourth man was sentenced to 1 year and 2 months in jail. The Finnish Police also surveyed an ONA adherent and associate of Nyman who was suspected of planning a ritual murder and was subsequently arrested. The man is also suspected of a string of letter bombs sent to Social Democrat, Green and Left party offices.

As of November 2023, Finnish police was investigating at least three terrorism cases connected to ONA and AWD. According to Iltalehti, the Finnish central nexion in Tampere is potentially connected to unsolved murder cases in the city.

=== France (L'Œuvre) ===
According to Le Parisien, a French man referred to as Simon planned a double mass murder with an Alsatian man known as Nicholas which was to occur on Hitler's birthday, April 20. As a preparation, Simon had already scouted around his former high school and a nearby mosque, in Seine-Maritime. Simon wrote that "[he] want[ed] to do worse than Columbine", also professing an admiration for mass murderer Anders Breivik. Simon was arrested and taken into custody on September 28, by the police from the General Directorate for Internal Security (DGSI). Brought before an anti-terrorism judge, he was indicted for "criminal terrorist association" and placed in pre-trial detention. At his home, investigators discovered a collection of around 20 knives and at least three firearms including a long rifle equipped with a telescopic sight and a shotgun. Through AWD, Simon came to meet his "brothers in arms", Leila B and Nicholas. Like Simon, Leila B. planned to carry out a deadly attack in her high school. She also planned to plant a bomb in the church closest to her home during the Easter holidays. Detected by the DGSI a few days before the planned day of action, she was indicted on April 8, 2021, for "criminal terrorist association".

=== Argentina (AWD Argentina) ===
The existence of AWD affiliate in Argentina was first reported in early 2020. Tomás Gershanik of the Public Prosecutor's Office in Buenos Aires stated that Argentina was no exception, and the local chapter spread propaganda in universities and organizes firearm drills. The expose by the media was spurred by Grand Rabbi Gabriel Davidovich of Asociación Mutual Israelita Argentina being violently beaten by the Argentinian neo-Nazis. According to Cyber Threats Research Centre (CYTREC) at Swansea University, AWD Argentina maintained contacts with AWD-affiliated neo-Nazis in neighboring Brazil. AWD Argentina was member of Iron Order, a coalition of accelerationist groups. In October 2023, law enforcement uncovered a new AWD cell in Mar del Plata, confiscating multiple assault rifles during the raids. Police raided AWD cells in Tucumán, Santa Fe, and General Belgrano, Buenos Aires, resulting in multiple arrests.

Two AWD members were arrested for threatening a prominent Argentinian LGBT activist and "forming a white supremacist association".

=== Brazil (AWD Brazil) ===
Since the presidency of Jair Bolsonaro, AWD and other organizations had rapidly worked to create neo-Nazi cells, counting up to 330 as of 2019, this growth being even with the number of hate crimes. The offshoot of the AWD had been active since at least 2019, responsible for translating and disseminating propaganda in Portuguese and distribution of a manual for making explosive devices.

In May 2021, in the podcast "Infiltrado No Cast", presenter Ale Santos infiltrated an AWD Brasil chat, using false information, documenting the group's recruitment process. In November 2023, the Brazilian Intelligence Agency arrested seven men affiliated with AWD in an operation titled "Operation Accelerare". Around 100 civil police officers participated in the action. They are charged with participation in a criminal group and promoting Nazism. The men were allegedly leaders of the neo-Nazi cells in Rio Grande do Sul and Ceará. The police also raided 23 addresses in Rio Grande do Sul, Curitiba, São Paulo, Araçoiaba da Serra, Ribeirão Pires and Fortaleza where they seized electronic devices, weapons and Nazi paraphernalia.

=== Spain (Blue Division) ===
In September 2020, the Civil Guard and the Mossos d'Esquadra arrested two men in La Pobla de Cérvoles and El Campello, for planning terror attacks in order to provoke a "race war". Explosives and firearms were confiscated in the raid. The men had been involved with a project to create all-white rural community and stockpile firearms for the collapse of the society. Two months later, in December 2020, two men in Pamplona and Ronda were arrested for plotting similar terror attacks. According to the investigators the four men were involved with AWD and had produced AWD propaganda in Spanish. Besides stockpiling firearms and explosives, the men manufactured aphrodisiac psychoactive drugs. In addition to these late 2020 arrests, the El Confidencial newspaper reported of two previous foiled terror attacks by affiliated men: a young man with 150 kilos of explosives planned to blow up the University of the Balearic Islands and a Mexican national living in Spain planned to attack a far-left demonstration with Asphyxiant gas.

Later in December 2023, the Spanish Civil Guard arrested 11 leaders and an additional 11 individuals are under investigation for belonging to a Nazi paramilitary group linked to AWD. Ten firearms, more than 9,000 cartridges, 34 bottles of sulfuric acid, explosive precursors, and numerous prohibited weapons were seized. The association had headquarters in the province of Málaga.

== Symbolism ==
AWD's logo features a shield bearing a ionizing radiation hazard trefoil, the internationally recognised symbol for ionizing radiation, modelled after a Waffen-SS divisional insignia. The shield is sometimes enclosed by a wreath, a design commonly found in white supremacist imagery. The group's flag displays the emblem and wreath against a black background, with four yellow rays extending diagonally from the centre towards each corner.

== In popular culture ==
AWD has been the subject of five full-length documentaries, United Gangs of America: AWD by Vice TV, Documenting Hate: New American Nazis by PBS, "Im Verhör: Die AWD-Division" (parts one and two) by Spiegel TV and MSNBC's Breaking Hate: AWD.

== See also ==
- Terrorgram – Network of neo-fascist Telegram channels
- List of neo-Nazi organizations
- List of organizations designated by the Southern Poverty Law Center as hate groups
- List of white nationalist organizations
