= Brandon Russell =

American neo-Nazi (born 1995)

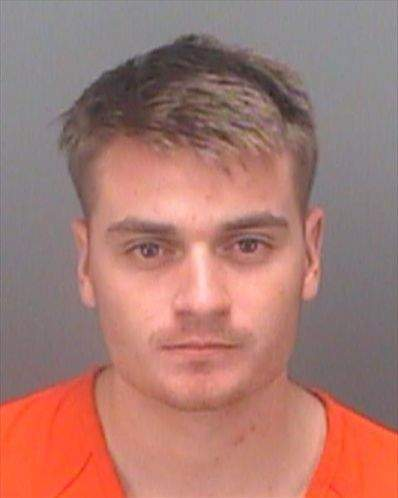
- 2017 mugshot

Leader of the Atomwaffen Division
- In office 2015–2017
- Succeeded by: John Cameron Denton

Personal details
- Born: July 1, 1995 (age 31) Florida, United States
- Citizenship: Bahamas, United States
- Education: University of South Florida
- Occupation: Ex-Florida National Guardsman; Neo-Nazi leader

Brandon Clint Russell (born July 1, 1995) is a Bahamian and American neo-Nazi leader and the founder of the neo-Nazi group Atomwaffen Division in 2015.

In September 2017, Russell pleaded guilty in federal court to possessing an unregistered destructive device and illegally storing explosives; in January 2018, he was sentenced to five years in prison, but was released in August 2021. In February 2023, he was indicted for planning attacks on electric substations in Baltimore. He was subsequently convicted. On August 7, 2025, Russell was sentenced to 20 years in prison.

== Early life and education ==
Brandon Clint Russell was born on July 1, 1995, in Florida. He is a dual citizen of the U.S. and The Bahamas. He studied nuclear physics at the University of South Florida as an undergraduate and became a Florida Army National Guardsman.

== Career ==
Russell, who went by the handle "Odin", first appeared on the right wing Iron March webforum on March 22, 2014, at age 18. Iron March was a far-right neo-fascist and neo-Nazi web forum. The site opened in 2011 and attracted neo-fascist and neo-Nazi members, including militants from organized far-right groups and members who would later go on to commit acts of terror.

Russell created contacts with American and international neo-Nazis and in an October 2015 post on Iron March, he announced the formation of Atomwaffen Division, which had been three years in the making. He stated that Atomwaffen was for very fanatical, ideological people who do military training, absolutely "no keyboard warriors". Dozens responded to the thread, which stated they had 40 members across the U.S., mostly in Florida.

Russell visited Atomwaffen's ideological comrades, National Action, in the United Kingdom. He also went to meet with the leaderships of Golden Dawn, Nordic Resistance Movement, Russian Imperial Movement and CasaPound in a neo-Nazi event in the Russian Federation in 2015.

=== Tampa murders and first arrest ===
In May 2017, Russell's friend and roommate Devon Arthurs was accused of killing two of his roommates and fellow Atomwaffen Division members with an assault rifle. Arthurs was arrested following a hostage situation in Tampa, during which he allegedly told police that he shot 22-year-old Jeremy Himmelman and 18-year-old Andrew Oneschuk earlier that day to prevent further violence. On the night of Devon Arthurs' arrest, then 21-year-old Russell was also arrested and questioned by local police and the FBI. While it was determined that Russell was not involved in the homicides, the deaths drew investigators' attention to a large stash of explosives in Russell's garage; they found ammonium nitrate, nitromethane, homemade detonators, and hexamethylene triperoxide diamine. HMTD has been used to make improvised explosive devices by groups such as Al-Qaeda, and ammonium nitrate and nitromethane were used by Timothy McVeigh, in the Oklahoma City bombing. The authorities also found thorium and americium, two radioactive substances, in Russell's bedroom. Russell had a framed photograph of Timothy McVeigh in his bedroom. The authorities also discovered guns, various Atomwaffen paraphernalia and neo-Nazi propaganda. Yet Russell was released.

The FBI issued an arrest warrant for Russell on explosives charges and the FBI bulletin warned he might be planning a terrorist attack. Russell was arrested again with another member in Monroe County, Florida. The car they were driving contained assault rifles, body armor and more than 1000 rounds of ammunition which they had acquired after the shooting. Russell claimed the explosives were used to power model rockets, but according to an FBI bomb technician the explosives were powerful enough to destroy an airliner. The prosecutors alleged Russell "planned to use the explosives to harm civilians, nuclear facilities and synagogues."

In September 2017, Russell pleaded guilty in federal court to possessing an unregistered destructive device and illegally storing explosives; in January 2018, he was sentenced to five years in prison. While in jail awaiting sentencing, he sent bomb-making instructions to his followers. While less than six months into his five-year sentence he issued a statement recorded inside United States Penitentiary in Atlanta. Russell thanked his comrades for their "undying loyalty and courage," and issued a warning: "There is no room in this world for cowardly people... The sword has been drawn. There is no turning back." On a separate occasion Russell also stated "I don't care how long you put me in jail, your Honor ... as soon as I get out, I will go right back to fight for my White Race and my America!'" He was released from prison on August 23, 2021.

=== Baltimore attack plot ===
In February 2023, a federal grand jury indicted Russell for allegedly conspiring with Sarah Clendaniel, a woman from Maryland he met in prison, on planning attacks on electric substations in the Baltimore area. Russell allegedly shared open-source maps of infrastructure and pointed out substations he said would cause a "cascading failure" if they were taken out. A magistrate judge in Florida ordered Russell held pending trial. On February 4, 2025, Russell was found guilty of one count of conspiracy to damage an energy facility.

=== Prison sentence ===
On August 7, 2025, Judge James K. Bredar sentenced Russell to the maximum 20 years in prison and a lifetime of supervised release, rejecting arguments that he was less culpable than Clendaniel.

In prison, Russell has organized together with other former Atomwaffen members a neo-Nazi newsletter targeted at prisoners, White Prison Newsletter, that promotes neo-fascism and accelerationism. It has been endorsed by notable neo-Nazis inmates such as Robert Gregory Bowers. The Newsletter has also been promoted on the Internet by American Futurist.

Walter Bond, also known as “ALF Lone Wolf,” befriended Russell while serving his sentence for arson attacks against companies that sold animal products. After his release Bond drifted to ecofascism, associating with Atomwaffen Division and sharing "Third Reich–era vegan propaganda", which alienated some of his supporters within Animal Liberation Front.
