= MKY =

MKY is a three-letter acronym that may refer to:

- Mackay Airport (IATA: MKY) in Mackay, Queensland, Australia
- Maniac Murder Cult (MKY), worldwide neo-Nazi group based in Ukraine and Russia
- Marco Island Airport (FAA: MKY) in Marco Island, Florida, United States
