= American Futurist =

Neo-Nazi website

The American Futurist
- Website type: Neo-Nazi blog and shop
- Country of origin: United States
- Website: americanfuturist.net
- Launched: 2020

The American Futurist (TAF) is a neo-Nazi accelerationist blog site and a webshop that sells books and clothing founded by former members of the Atomwaffen Division. The TAF proclaims they promote "revolutionary fascist ideals". The TAF is also designated as a hate group by the Southern Poverty Law Center.

== History and content ==
The TAF was originally founded in 2020 to propagate the so-called Siege culture of the neo-Nazi leader James Mason. The former Atomwaffen members announced the creation of the National Socialist Order on TAF in 2020. The TAF cut ties with Mason in 2022 over a split in the NSO: A faction of the NSO adhering to the satanic fascist Order of Nine Angles had announced a takeover and split from the NSO forming "National Socialist Order of Nine Angles", and Mason allegedly worked with a member of the NSO9A alleged to be a pedophile by the TAF, among other accusations. Even with the falling out with Mason, the TAF still closely adheres to accelerationism and the teachings of Siege. Although originally exclusively staffed by US based ex-Atomwaffen members, the site has expanded to include contributors from affiliates from other countries, such as Finland.

In July 2023 the TAF published an interview with the founder of the Base Rinaldo Nazzaro.

The TAF has published articles praising Hamas and the Taliban. The TAF also maintains a section of the site dedicated to "Prisoners of War", and these include Atomwaffen leaders Kaleb James Cole and John Cameron Denton, and Samuel Lincoln Woodward responsible for the murder of Blaze Bernstein. Atomwaffen founder Brandon Russell was also able to contribute articles from prison to the website, entitled "Prison Essays". In late 2021 the site was taken offline as the registrat was contacted by the UN Counter Terrorism Executive Directorate, but subsequently returned online. Russell also continued to promote and contribute to the TAF during the time when he was free before his new prison sentence: The TAF posted links to various infrastructure networks with the comment "pretty cool maps". On August 7, 2025, Russell was sentenced to prison for planning attacks on Baltimore power grid. The TAF responded to Russell's arrest and later conviction with support for Russell and cautioning against discussing illegal activity on the internet. In 2025 the TAF announced the publication of accelerationist prison letter White Prison Newsletter, written by Russell with contributors and supporters such as Robert Gregory Bowers and distributed in prison and through its site.

In November 2023 the TAF started promoting accelerationist Patriot Front splinter called Texas Revolutionary Army – Patriot Front (TRA-PF) on its site. Institute for Strategic Dialogue noted that the TAF was a member of a group of neo-Nazis normally hostile to "non-violent public-facing activism" and may have attempted to poach disaffected Patriot Front members. ISD wrote with concern that the campaign may expose less radicalized Patriot Front members to violent accelerationist propaganda and mobilize them for violence. The TAF shared TRA-PF's public communiques that were crudely racist like "Patriot Front is dedicated to exterminating all mud races [and] total n****r death". While some actors on the right have denounced the original PF as being too radical and thus a federal "honeypot", according to the TAF the opposite is true: the PF is likely genuine but only serves to hinder radicalization.

The Global Network on Extremism and Technology observed in 2024 that the TAF site is part of a sphere of violent extremist groups, including neo-Nazi Russian and Ukrainian mercenary groups and violent French football hooligans.

The TAF reacted to the assassination of Charlie Kirk by stating "We hope this is a lesson learned for the remaining moderates out there", encouraging conservatives to radicalize and embrace Nazism if they are going to be shot in any case.

=== Books ===
The TAF has printed and sold multiple books written by its authors through its webshop. The book seller Amazon also bought these books in bulk and distributed them through its internet site. These books include The Movementarian Menace written by Vincent Snyder (pseudonym of John Cameron Denton), The Futurist State and Why We Fight. All the books exhort violence against sexual and racial minorities. The Amazon sale was celebrated by the TAF, who said in a blogpost that Amazon is slow to remove extremist material, and two books by TAF appeared in top 10 in their respective categories, despite having swastikas on the cover. Once discovered and reported by the media, the controversy caused the books to be eventually removed. The books, in addition to reprinted Siege, are still available in TAF's webshop.
