= Alex Davies (neo-Nazi) =

Welsh terrorist (born 1994/95)

Alex Davies (born 1994 or 1995) is a Welsh neo-Nazi. He is one of the founders of National Action (NA), the first far-right group banned in the United Kingdom since World War II.

== Early life ==
In 2011, at the age of 16, he was referred to the Prevent programme, a government scheme to engage with extremists. He joined the youth wing of the British National Party (BNP), but was disappointed at the 'disarray' of the party. He studied philosophy at the University of Warwick, where he sought to promote his political leanings on campus.

== National Action and conviction ==
In 2012, National Action was founded by Davies and Benjamin Raymond, a student from the University of Essex. The aim of the group was to create a Neo-Nazi youth movement in the UK. At a National Action parade in Liverpool, Davies stated, "We’re like the BNP but more radical". He left the university at the end of the first year of his course, following an article in the Sunday Mirror in June 2014 which revealed his part in National Action. He returned to South Wales to work in a telephone centre, and in 2018 lived in Swansea.

In 2016, he addressed the Welsh Forum on a topic of "Saunders Lewis and Militant Welsh Nationalism". In May 2016, Davies had an argument with a mixed-race girl and her mother in Bath, and the video went "viral". National Action was banned by Home Secretary Amber Rudd in December 2016 for being "a racist, anti-Semitic and homophobic organisation".

After National Action was banned by the government in December 2016, the Metropolitan Police's Counter Terrorism Policing Unit and the Crown Prosecution Service compiled evidence against members of NA who continued to actively promote its views via a series of regional organisations. On 17 May 2022, Davies was found guilty by jury of being a "member of a proscribed organisation" (the fascist group National Action). During his trial at Winchester Crown Court, prosecutor Barnaby Jameson told the court after the government banned NA, that Davies had set up a group called National Socialist Anti-Capitalist Action or NS131, using similar graphics, slogans and communications methods to NA, which was also later banned by the UK government. Jameson put to Davies in court: "You are a neo-Nazi, yes?" Davies replied: "Sure." The case was adjourned for sentencing at Old Bailey, the Central Criminal Court, on 7 June 2022. On 7 June 2022, Davies was sentenced to eight and a half years in prison.
