= Timeline of crimes involving the Order of Nine Angles =

This page is a chronological list of criminal cases and incidents involving individuals or groups allegedly associated with the Order of Nine Angles (ONA or O9A), a secretive and extremist group with an esoteric neo-Nazi, and Satanist ideology. ONA has been proscribed as a terrorist organization in New Zealand.

According to a report by the civil rights group Southern Poverty Law Center, the ONA "holds an important position in the niche, international nexus of occult, esoteric, and/or satanic neo-Nazi groups." Several newspapers have reported that the ONA is linked to a number of high-profile figures from the far right and that the group is affiliated and shares affiliates with neo-Nazi groups such as the Atomwaffen Division, proscribed National Action, Sonnenkrieg Division, Combat 18 and Nordic Resistance Movement (NRM). Additionally, the leader of the eco-extremist group Individualists Tending to the Wild has claimed to have been influenced by the ONA.

Allegations have been made by antifascist organisations, several British politicians and the media that the ONA condones and encourages sexual abuse, and this has been given as one of the reasons why the ONA should be proscribed by the British government. Many ONA adherents openly advocate rape as an effective way to undermine society by transgressing against its norms. White Star Acception commits rapes by their own admission, and ONA texts such as The Dreccian Way, Iron Gates, Bluebird and The Rape Anthology praise rape and pedophilia, even suggesting rape is necessary for "ascension of the Ubermensch". To advance in rank, ONA member must perform assaults, with lynchings and sexual assaults being the most recommended. Material promoting pedophilia has also appeared in ONA's in-house magazines Fenrir and Drums of Tophet, the latter of which also contained "borderline [child porn]". According to BBC News, "the authorities are concerned by the number of paedophiles associated with the ONA".

== Timeline of crimes involving the Order of Nine Angles ==
=== 2011 ===
Ryan Fleming of Yorkshire-based ONA nexion Drakon Covenant was sentenced to 26 months in prison for false imprisonment and sexual assault of a vulnerable teenager.

=== 2017 ===
Ryan Fleming was again sentenced to three years in jail for the rape of a 14-year-old girl.

=== 2019 ===
In 2024, the FBI released files stating that a string of 2019 arson attacks against Black churches were connected to the ONA.

A US paratrooper named Ethan Melzer in the 173rd Airborne Brigade's Sky Soldiers, who was assigned to the 1st Battalion, 503rd Infantry Regiment, in Vicenza, Italy, in 2019 until 2020, plotted an ambush on his unit, "to result in the deaths of as many of his fellow service members as possible." He was charged in June 2020 with conspiring and attempting to murder military service members, and providing and attempting to provide material support to terrorists. The paratrooper was charged with leaking classified information (including the unit's location and security) to his co-conspirators in the RapeWaffen nexion and the Order of the Nine Angles (O9A). In June 2022 he pleaded guilty to three charges and on March 3, 2023, Melzer was sentenced to 45 years in prison.

In November 2019, a Durham teen who, according to the BBC News, adheres to "occult Nazism" and, after being "influenced by the ONA," sought "to alter himself in line with their literature," was found guilty of preparing a terrorist attack. In addition to the terror offences, he is charged with sexually assaulting a 12-year-old girl. He was eventually convicted of five sexual assaults in addition to the terror offenses.

=== 2020 ===
Simpson in Ohio Army National Guard uniform

After Melzer was exposed, several other active members of the US military were also discovered to be adherents of the ONA. Corwyn Storm Carver was found to be another in communication with the group and in possession of ONA paraphernalia and literature while stationed in Kuwait. Shandon Simpson, member of the Ohio Army National Guard sent to quell the George Floyd protests in Washington, D.C. openly espoused neo-Nazi views and was also found to be in the RapeWaffen. Simpson told that he was planning to shoot the protesters as part of "racial holy war" and was intercepted by the FBI but only after he had already been deployed.

In January 2020, ONA followers Luke Austin Lane, Jacob Kaderli and Michael Helterbrand were arrested for and later convicted of stockpiling weapons and plotting to kill an antifascist couple and their young children. In preparation Lane, along with a dozen other people, had engaged in paramilitary training and sacrificed a ram, drank its blood and consumed psychedelic drugs in an occult ritual on his property.

The British political advocacy group Hope not Hate reported in March 2020 that there were six cases of neo-Nazis connected to ONA being prosecuted for terrorist offenses during the year alone.

In March 2020, Hope not Hate began a campaign to have the Order of Nine Angles banned, proscribed, as a terrorist group, a campaign supported by several British members of Parliament including the Labour Party's Yvette Cooper, Chair of the Home Affairs Select Committee.

On 18 September 2020, Toronto Police arrested 34-year-old Guilherme "William" Von Neutegem and charged him with the murder of Mohamed-Aslim Zafis. Zafis was the caretaker of a local mosque who was found dead with his throat cut. The Toronto Police Service said the killing is possibly connected to the stabbing murder of Rampreet Singh a few days prior a short distance from the spot where Zafis' murder took place. Von Neutegem is an ONA adherent and social media accounts established as to belonging to him promote the group and included recordings of Von Neutegem performing satanic chants. In his home there was also an altar with the symbol of the ONA adorning a monolith. According to Evan Balgord of the Canadian Anti-Hate Network, they are aware of more ONA members in Canada, and their affiliated organization Northern Order. CAHN reported previously of the Northern Order when a member in Canadian Armed Forces was caught selling firearms and explosives to other neo-Nazis.

Canadian Armed Forces launched an internal investigation in October 2020 after a special forces soldier with the CJIRU was identified as a member of the Northern Order and Order of Nine Angles. According to the SPLC, the man is among "some pretty well-known, high-up people in these organizations" and an acquaintance of James Mason and the former Master Corporal Patrik Mathews who was previously exposed as a recruiter for the Northern Order and Base in Canada.

15-year-old Rhianan Rudd allegedly planned blowing up a synagogue and was arrested in October 2020 in the United Kingdom. Home office however dropped the charges after concluding "she had been a victim of trafficking who had been groomed and sexually exploited". Rudd was allegedly radicalized by Atomwaffen and ONA. She died by suicide on 19 May 2022.

Danyal Hussein who killed two sisters, Bibaa Henry and Nicole Smallman, in a Wembley park in London was "closely associated" with the Order of Nine Angles and took part in an ONA internet forum. He killed the two women to fulfill a "demonic pact". In response MP Stephanie Peacock called on the Home Secretary to proscribe the ONA. In Russia four Order of Nine Angles adherents were arrested after two confessed to ritual murders involving cannibalism in Karelia and Saint Petersburg. Two of them were also accused of large-scale drug trafficking as a large amount of narcotics was found in their home.

On 11 December 2020, the UK based video hosting service BitChute removed all ONA material for violating the site's anti-terror policy, citing ONA's "close connections with other proscribed organisations". The same month Yahoo! News acquired a report by the US National Counterterrorism Center, the FBI and the Department of Homeland Security circulated to U.S. intelligence agencies, assessing that the ONA poses a violent threat and that it plays an influential role among right-wing terror groups. The report however added that the ONA was rejected by certain groups for inciting its adherents to commit rape and pedophilia.

ONA adherent Andrew Dymock, who was convicted of 15 terror offences, has also been questioned by the police regarding the sexual assault of a teenage girl who had Nazi and occult symbols carved on her body. In July 2020, another ONA adherents Jacek Tchorzewski was convicted by Harrow Crown Court for terror offences and for possessing over 500 pictures and videos depicting children as young as six being raped and necrophilia. Tchorzewski also possessed Nazi and "satanist literature depicting rape and pedophilia". Tchorzewski's co-defendant Michal Szewczuk "ran a blog that encouraged the rape and torture of opponents, including small children" and was likewise sentenced to four years in prison for terror offences. Ethan Melzer also belonged to an encrypted ONA chatroom where adherents encouraged one another to perpetrate sexual violence and shared videos of these rapes.

In March 2020, a prominent ONA adherent and former leader of Atomwaffen Division John Cameron Denton was accused by prosecutors of possessing and sharing child sexual abuse material of a young underage girl by his group, in addition to making 134 death and bomb threats against reporters and minority communities. On 2 September 2020, Harry Vaughan pleaded guilty to 14 terrorism offenses and possession of child sexual abuse material. A police search of his house uncovered videos of brutal rapes of children, documents showing how to build bombs, detonators, firearms, and "satanic, neo-Nazi" ONA books advising rape and murder. In addition to this he was described in the Old Bailey as a firearms enthusiast and living with his two young sisters at the time of the arrest.

=== 2021 ===
In January 2021, after the 2021 storming of the United States Capitol, discussion about proscribing far-right groups was renewed by the Public Safety Minister Bill Blair, and the ONA was named by experts as one of the most dangerous groups in Canada whose proscription is a priority. In April 2021, Democratic Representative Elissa Slotkin pressed Joe Biden's administration to designate ONA as a Foreign Terrorist Organisation (FTO) in a letter to Secretary of State Antony Blinken. The Sonnenkrieg Division was officially proscribed in Australia on March 22, 2021, with its adherence to "violent white-supremacist ideology inspired by the Nazi Party and the Satanic 'Order of Nine Angles' movement" cited as the reason.

On 12 August 2021, Ben John was convicted of terrorist offences after an 11-month investigation by the Counter Terrorism Command. The statement by Lincolnshire police stated that "John had a wealth of white supremacist and anti-Semitic material, as well as material related to the Satanist organisation called the Order of Nine Angles (ONA), which is increasingly under the focus of law enforcement." In October 2021, Facebook and Instagram banned ONA adherent E. A. Koetting whose page had 128,000 subscribers for inciting murder. In November 2021 roughly two dozen federal agents in body armor arrested Angel Almeida for possessing illegal weapons. According to New York Daily News Almeida was an adherent of the ONA.

On 1 February 2021, a Cornish man said to have been the leader of the UK branch of the Feuerkrieg Division pleaded guilty to 12 terrorism offences. Police had previously raided his home in 2019 for firearms and had found bomb building instructions and ONA literature.

Ryan Fleming was jailed again in 2021 for grooming underage children.

=== 2022 ===
In 2022 the Finnish Security Intelligence Service also singled out ONA as a source of radicalization and concern in the country. As of November 2023 Finnish police was investigating at least three terrorism cases connected to ONA. According to Iltalehti, Finnish ONA that has its central nexion in Tampere is potentially connected to unsolved murder cases in the city.

In Sweden NRM affiliate and ONA adherent Alexander Andersson has been arrested and charged with "aggravated rape against children" and he is suspected of offenses against 15 girls between the ages of 4 and 14. He is also accused of possessing 12 hours of child sexual abuse material. Andersson was convicted in 2023 of aggravated rape of children, rape of children, sexual abuse of children and a large number of cases of gross exploitation of children to twelve years in prison.

=== 2023 ===
Angel Almeida, a 22-year-old ONA adherent from Queens, has been charged with sexual exploitation of minors and possession of child sexual abuse material, among other alleged crimes. Almeida coerced two minors into partaking in sexual activities to create child sexual abuse material, according to the Department of Justice. He allegedly sold child sexual abuse material to fund distribution of ONA material. Luca Benincasa was sentenced to nine years and three months at Winchester Crown Court in January 2023. He had instructions on bomb making and was a recruiter and "prominent member" of the Feuerkrieg Division and ONA. He pleaded guilty to terrorism offences and possession of child sexual abuse material. In June 2023, Vaughan pleaded guilty to new charges for his production of child sexual abuse material.

=== 2024 ===
ONA and 764 adherent Richard Densmore (aka "Rabid"), a US Marine, was arrested on January 31, 2024, in Kaleva, Michigan, and faced possible life in prison for sexual exploitation of a child and possession of child sexual abuse material. According to the motion by the Department of Justice, Densmore would stream mutilation and sexual abuse of children. Densmore already had a prior conviction for a sexual offense involving a minor. In November 2024 Densmore was sentenced to 30 years in prison.

Sergey Chulkov ("Nosferatu") allegedly raped a 14-year-old girl several times in his car, then in an apartment on Moscow Zavodskaya Street. Chulkov is a member of a Russian nexion according to the police, was arrested with ONA literature, and was tattooed with satanic occult symbols.

Declan George Candiani was arrested by counter-terrorism forces while attempting to leave for Finland with another person on August 13, 2024. Candiani allegedly possessed Nazi and O9A books and tattoos, and claimed to the investigators he had made a pact with the Devil and was "possessed". Candiani is charged with possessing terrorist material like No Lives Matter and Maniac Murder Cult guides to perpetrating mass shootings, stabbings and car ramming attacks. In 2025 Candiani was sentenced to 23 months in prison for "collection of information likely to be useful for terrorism".

In December 2024, a high school student in Guadalajara, Mexico broadcast himself attacking his classmates with an axe. His social media posts showed his allegiance to the Order of Nine Angles, including satanic blood pacts.

=== 2025 ===
On February 12, 2025, the Italian police in Bolzano arrested a teen and charged him with participating in a terrorist organization, manufacture and use of explosive devices, possession of illegal firearms, criminal damage, possession and dissemination of child pornography. He allegedly planned to make a snuff film. He was allegedly affiliated with 764 and the Order of Nine Angles.

23-year-old Hugo Figuerola was arrested in late February 2025 in Spain for threatening a mass shooting and bombing in Valencia, leading to mass evacuation of institutions across Valencia. He was arrested by the Civil Guard, who also confiscated his electronics. Figuerola was affiliated with the Order of Nine Angles and 764 and used several aliases, including NeoHitler666.

A Wisconsin teen is alleged to have killed his father and mother on February 11, 2025, and planned to assassinate Donald Trump to "save the white race" and start a revolution. He was in possession of firearms, explosives and a drone and is charged with the murders. The teen was also in possession of ONA material and identified himself as a member of ONA.

An army combat veteran Kyle Christopher Benton was sentenced on July 18, 2025, to prison for two years and three months for possessing fully automatic machine guns and short barrel guns. Benton was affiliated with Order of Nine Angles and attended "hate rallies" in Oregon, Washington and Idaho. He also trained his fellow neo-Nazis in combat tactics and offered firearms workshops. He espoused accelerationism and praised the 2022 Buffalo shooting saying "Another glorious entry into the annals of Aryan Terror!" Benton had served as an infantryman in Afghanistan and Africa but was separated from the army for death threats.

On December 10, 2025, the New Zealand government banned ONA as a terrorist organization. Russian news website rbc.ru reported that ONA material had been banned by the order of St. Petersburg court for the ritual murders committed by members in Karelia.

=== 2026 ===
A teen in Florida was arrested in January 2026 and has been charged with "30 child pornography charges and counts of unlawfully using a communication device, attempted arson, and threatening a mass shooting or act of terrorism", allegedly inspired by O9A. He allegedly attempted arson of a church and plotted a mass shooting of Christians. The teen was deeply immersed in O9A ideology and used the symbol of the Tempel ov Blood made of bullets as his profile picture.

== Nexions of the ONA ==
=== RapeWaffen ===
"RapeWaffen" is a faction the ideas of which have roots in Atomwaffen and in the Order of Nine Angles, and which encourages its adherents to rape white women in order to increase the number of white births. The ideology came to public attention following the arrest of a former U.S. Marine who had been plotting to rape women and attack a synagogue.

=== Legion Ave Satan offshoot ===
Russian Federal Security Services arrested a group of satanists in April 2020 in Krasnodar suspected of "public calls to carry out extremist activities", incitement to murder due to religious and racial hatred, and criminal activities against women. The police also seized occult "extremist material" during the raids. They belonged to a group called Legion Ave Satan, a chapter of the ONA, using the Nazi Reichsadler grasping a pentagram and sword as its symbol. On their now-banned VKontakte page, they claimed nexions all over the CIS countries, promoted ONA, and identified as followers of "Traditional Satanism" and "pre-christian faith". They appeared in Russian media in 2018 when a teenager burned down a church in Republic of Karelia. The teenager had expressed his support for the Legion Ave Satan in VKontakte and posted pictures wearing a skull mask associated with Atomwaffen and ONA. He was sent to involuntary psychiatric treatment. The local nexion used an old poultry farm in Kondopoga for gatherings, and the group had lured children to prostitution according to Moskovskij Komsomolets. As is the case elsewhere, the group is connected to the local Atomwaffen chapter.

Four Russian adherents of the Order of Nine Angles were arrested for ritual murders in Karelia and Saint Petersburg in 2021. Nikolai Ogolobyak killed four girls in satanic rituals in Yaroslavl region in 2008. Ogolobyak together with other members of the satanic sect beheaded the corpses, ate their tongues and hearts and had sex with the corpses. While Ogolobyak was sentenced to 20 years in a penal colony, others had 8-10 year sentences or were sent to mental institution. The group adhered to satanic Nazism, and one of the members, Alexander Voronov, was nicknamed "Hitler". Ogolobyak's followers belonged to a local Order of Nine Angles nexion. Ogolobyak was pardoned in 2023 after fighting in Russia's invasion of Ukraine. In 2024 "Semyon", a member of Russian ONA was arrested for a string of rapes. "Semyon" had Nazi and satanist tattoos and had claimed Hitler was a hero of his religion and had called for a satanist revolution.

ONA literature has been banned on the territory of the Russian Federation as "extremist material".

On August 19, 2024, Rusich asked for a Ukrainian prisoner to be surrendered to them for a human sacrifice for "autumnal equinox to encourage and strengthen the spirit of the new personnel of the unit". Rusich is affiliated with the Order of Nine Angles and its affiliated groups like Atomwaffen and Nordic Resistance Movement. Later it emerged that Rusich members had sacrificed a Chechen Akhmat fighter in a ritual and recorded themselves mutilating him. Newspaper "Contando Estrelas" pointed out that "last year, the Russian newspaper Izvestia linked the ONA to murders committed in the Karelia region", the location of the Russian central nexion, and now the region where Rusich is deployed.

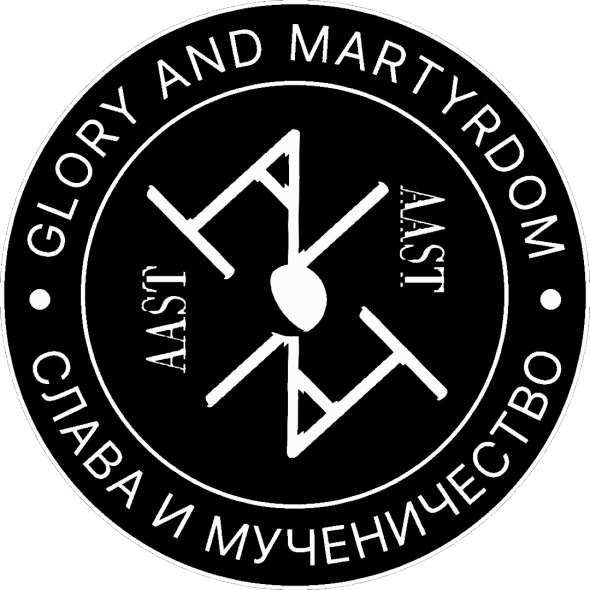
Logo of AAST

Russian ONA is part of a coalition of neo-Nazi groups taking part in Russian invasion of Ukraine consisting of Atomwaffen Russland, Rusich Group, and Russian Imperial Movement, with some overlap. AAST (stylised as AAᛋT) is a mainly Russian ONA militant group linked to Atomwaffen fighting in Donbass and Ukraine and they post on social media about their "martyrdom" in the battlefield.

=== Finland ===
On December 4, 2021, the Finnish police arrested a five-man cell in Kankaanpää on suspicion of planning a terror attack and confiscated numerous firearms, including assault rifles, and forty kilos of explosives and hundreds of litres of explosive precursors. According to the Finnish media, the men adhered to the ideology of Atomwaffen, James Mason and ONA Satanism. The men are suspected of having planned to blow up a refugee centre in Niinisalo for which they had acquired explosives, and the men are suspected of homophobic assaults and arson of another refugee center. In July 2023 the Finnish police arrested five men in Lahti who possessed assault rifles and adhered to accelerationism and Siege and planned to ignite a race war by attacking the infrastructure, electric grid and railroads. The men discussed forming a new Atomwaffen cell, and discussed assassinating the prime minister, Sanna Marin. It was reported the men had at least planned training in Russia, and had met with Janus Putkonen who has been involved in recruiting Finns for the war in eastern Ukraine. Later multiple sources confirmed the men had acquired training for the use of firearms and explosives from the Russian Imperial Movement. Additionally the group committed burglaries against left-wing targets. According to Finnish National Bureau of Investigation, both Finnish terrorist groups were connected to Order of Nine Angles and leaders of both groups adhered to the faith and possessed the same ONA books and one had even tattooed himself with ONA symbols. On October 31, 2023, the men from Lahti were convicted of terrorism offenses. A 29-year-old Viljam Nyman was sentenced to 3 years and 4 months. A man born in 2001 was sentenced to 7 months of probation and another man born in 1996 was sentenced to 1 year and 9 months. The fourth man was sentenced to 1 year and 2 months in jail. The Finnish Police also surveyed an ONA adherent and associate of Nyman who was suspected of planning a ritual murder and was subsequently arrested. The man is also suspected of a string of letter bombs sent to Social Democrat, Green and Left party offices.

In addition to the central nexion in Tampere and the ones in Kankaanpää ("Nexion Vihtu") and Lahti, Finland has at least two others, "Louhi Lodge" and "the Temple of the Black Sun". According to Izvestia investigation, the Temple is run by a Russian man living in Finland, and it has branches in Northwestern Russia, where initiates have performed rituals in Murmansk Oblast and Karelia bordering Finland. The network also runs the publishing house "Totenburg". Dozens of people involved in the Russian branch have taken part in the invasion of Ukraine, and Finnish members have visited training camps run by Russian neo-Nazis. Russian Temple members have been arrested for child sexual abuse. According to Expo, Finnish ONA has organized firearm drills for its members.

A far-right Finns Party Espoo city council member Jiri Keronen told that he "avows" the teachings of ONA and that he is republishing their works. Viljam Nyman had been member of the Lapland board of the Finns Party, and the Finnish member suspected of a string of letter bombs was a party ideologue, publishing dozens of articles in the Finns party organ.

In July 2025, the Finnish police announced the investigation of a Finnish teen who was in contact with 764 and allegedly convinced a man to commit suicide. In addition the police were examining whether two suicides committed by teen girls in Jätkäsaari that month are linked. In November 2025 the Finnish National Bureau of Investigation announced they have arrested multiple local people affiliated with Nihilistic violent extremism networks of the Com, 764, NLM and MKU. They are believed to have victimized dozens of children.
