= Patrick Gordon Macdonald =

Canadian neo-Nazi graphic designer

- Born: 1996 or 1997
- Other name: Dark Foreigner
- Occupation: Graphic designer
- Organization(s): Northern Order, Active Club Network
- Notable work: Cover art for Siege (2018 edition)

Patrick Gordon Macdonald is a Canadian Neo-Nazi graphic designer and convicted terrorist, who uses the pseudonym Dark Foreigner.

== Biography ==
Macdonald was born in 1996 or 1997. He works as a graphic designer and runs Helios Design Studios, a graphic design studio based in Ottawa. He designed the cover art for the 2018 edition of James Mason's "hyper-violent neo-Nazi insurgency manual" Siege.

Macdonald uses the pseudonym Dark Foreigner, which he first adopted on the now-defunct Iron March in 2017. Originally a libertarian, he wrote online about his views shifting towards the political right and becoming anti-islamic.

Macdonald was accused by Canadian authorities of producing and promoting three videos by the neo-Nazi terrorist organization Atomwaffen Division, and was one of two people arrested by the Royal Canadian Mounted Police for terrorism-related activities on 5 July 2023. The charges were: "participating in the activity of a terrorist group, facilitating terrorist activity and commission of an offence for a terrorist group (wilful promotion of hatred)." Macdonald is the first person in Canadian history to be arrested and charged under both anti-terrorism and hate speech legislation. He appeared in court on July 5 and 7, 2023 and was released on bail on August 30 the same year. His trial began in November 2024. He pleaded not guilty to the charges brought against him. In April 2025, he was convicted of all charges.

== Personal life ==
Macdonald lives with his parents in Ottawa. His home was raided by police in March 2022.

== See also ==
- Neo-Nazism in Canada
