= Attempted assassination of Cristina Fernández de Kirchner =

2022 Argentine vice president assassination attempt

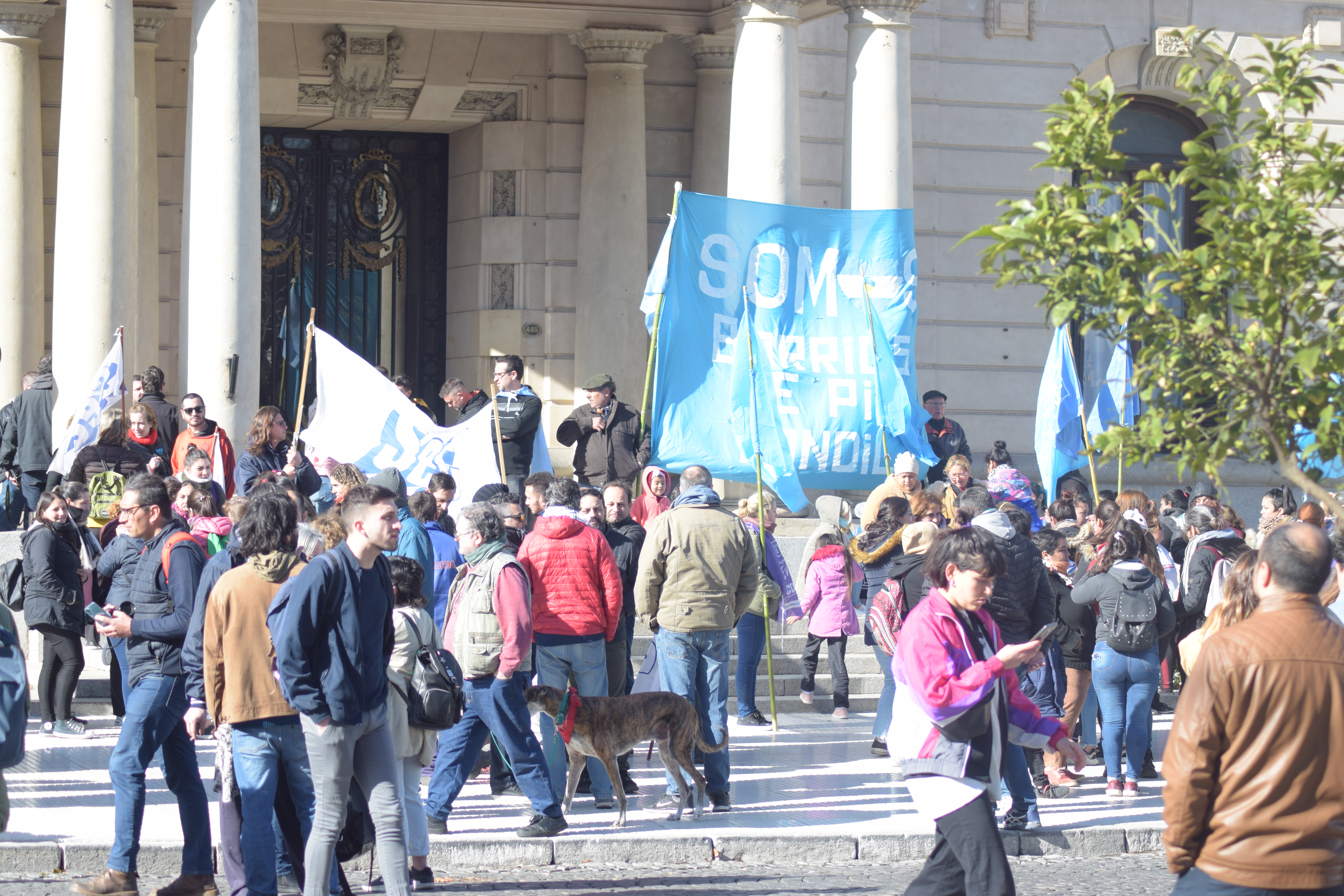
- Protests shortly after the assassination attempt
- Location: 34°35′34″S 58°23′15″W; Recoleta, Buenos Aires, Argentina
- Date: 1 September 2022; 4 years ago c. 9 p.m. (UTC–3)
- Target: Cristina Fernández de Kirchner
- Attack type: Attempted assassination by shooting
- Weapon: 7.5 mm Bersa Lusber 84 (semi-automatic pistol)
- Perpetrator: Fernando Sebag Montiel

On 1 September 2022, a man attempted to assassinate Cristina Fernández de Kirchner, the vice president and former president of Argentina. The assailant approached Fernández de Kirchner as she met with supporters outside of her official residence in Recoleta, Buenos Aires, and attempted to shoot her in the head with a semi-automatic pistol. The pistol failed to fire, and the suspect was immediately arrested on scene. Police arrested Fernando André Sabag Montiel, a 35-year-old Brazilian man who has lived in Argentina since 1993. He was tried for attempted homicide, and was convicted on 8 October 2025. He was sentenced to 10 years' imprisonment.

== Background ==
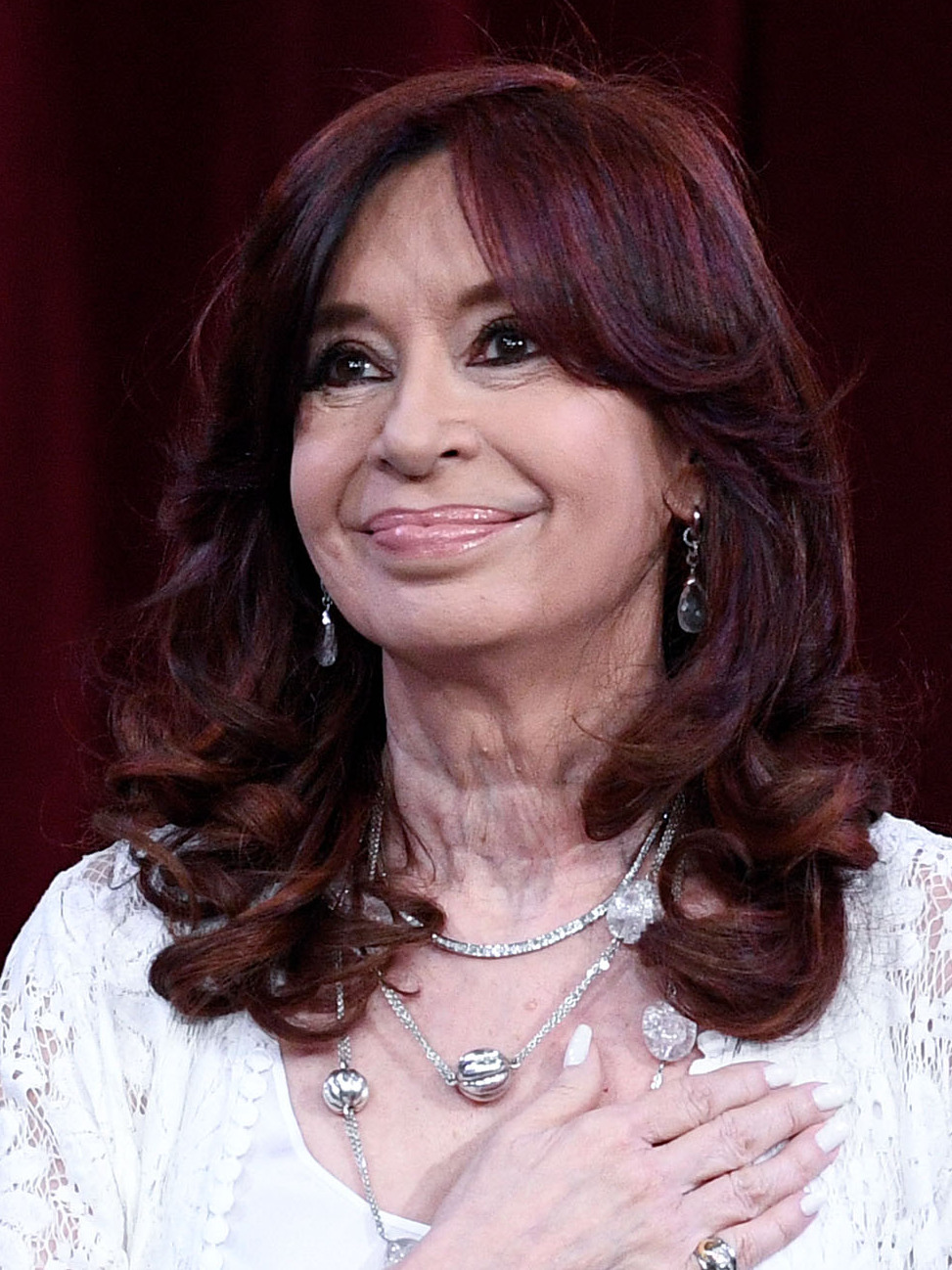
Cristina Fernández de Kirchner (pictured in 2022), then-Vice President of Argentina at the time of the assassination attempt

Cristina Fernández de Kirchner is a prominent lawyer and politician in Argentina. She was the first lady of Néstor Kirchner, who was Argentina's president from 2003 to 2007. She ran for and won the presidency after her husband declined to run for a second term in 2007. She served two terms before leaving office in 2015. In the 2019 presidential election, she was the running mate of Alberto Fernández, and has served as vice president between December 2019 and December 2023.

In August 2022, federal prosecutors accused Fernández de Kirchner of corruption during both her presidency and that of her husband. Federal prosecutor Diego Luciani requested that courts sentence Fernández de Kirchner to 12 years imprisonment and permanent banning from public office for allegedly conspiring to award public works contracts to the construction firm of Lázaro Báez. In response, opponents of Fernández de Kirchner staged several demonstrations in front of her residence calling for her resignation, followed by her supporters showing up as a counter-protest. The demonstrations began almost a week before the attempt took place and were virtually constant. Fernández de Kirchner gave a speech outside her home on an improvised podium, calling the opposition's protests a product of "hatred for Peronism", and calling for all of the protesters to return home.

Several violent incidents between supporters and opposition occurred, including clashes with the Buenos Aires City Police and the detention of a man wielding a wrench as a weapon. On 30 August 2022, a judge requested federal protection for Fernández de Kirchner, transferring her protection to federal security authorities rather than the local Buenos Aires City Police.

== Attempted assassination ==
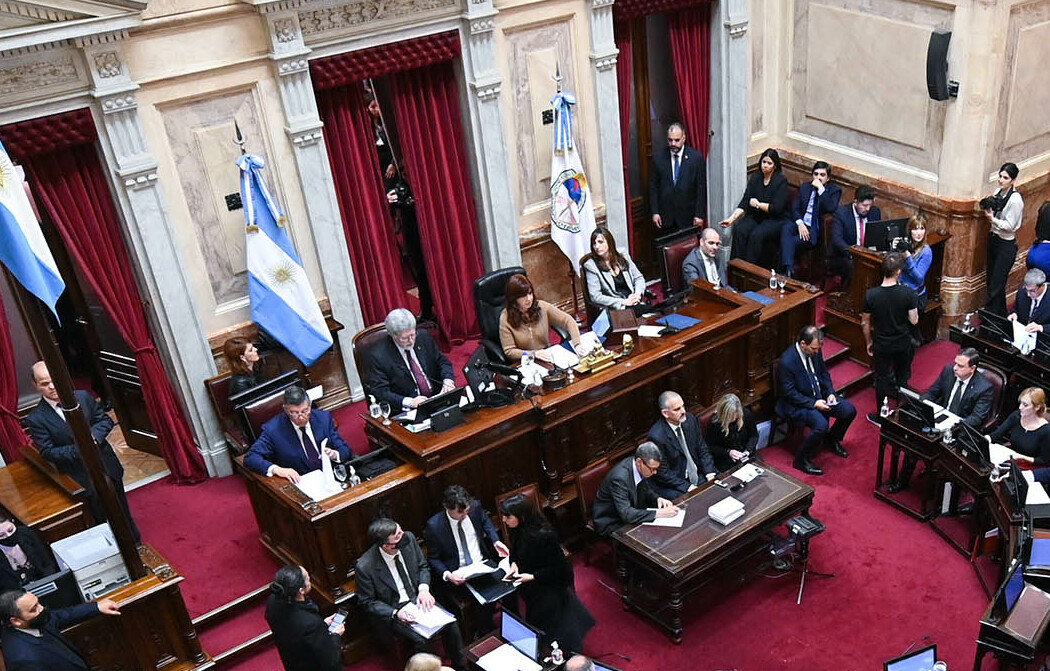
Fernández de Kirchner (wearing a brown blouse) presiding over the Senate hours before the attack

On 1 September 2022 at 8:50 p.m., Fernández de Kirchner had just returned to her official residence in Recoleta after presiding over a session at the Senate. As she was signing copies of her book, Sinceramente, for her supporters, Fernando André Sabag Montiel allegedly approached and pulled the trigger of a semi-automatic pistol mere inches from her face, but the gun failed to fire. According to initial reports, Fernández de Kirchner appeared to have shielded her face with her hand and ducked, though she later said she had not seen the gun. Another report said she may have stooped to pick up something from the ground. She was unharmed and the suspect was immediately arrested by her security detail.

The Bersa pistol used in the attack was recovered close to the scene. It was fully loaded with five cartridges although no round was found in the chamber of the weapon. It was reported that the assailant attempted to fire the gun twice, failing both times. Its serial number was partially removed, but the weapon was otherwise deemed "fit for firing" by official sources. According to The Guardian, several reports stated that the suspect may not have pulled the trigger; however, audio from several videos of the attack recorded an audible clicking sound.

== Suspect ==
The suspect was identified as Fernando André Sabag Montiel (born 13 January 1987), a 35-year-old Brazilian man from La Paternal, Buenos Aires, who has resided in Argentina since 1993. He worked as an Uber driver. On 17 March 2021, Sabag Montiel was found in possession of a 35-centimetre long knife during a traffic stop; he was arrested and charged with carrying "non-conventional weapons". The case was dropped by the prosecution as "it was not an important matter".

In the weeks before the attack, he was interviewed on the street by Crónica TV criticizing the government's welfare programs, claiming they made people "lazy". During the interview and in social media posts, Sabag Montiel made statements condemning both Fernández de Kirchner and her political opponent Javier Milei. Sabag Montiel has tattoos depicting Nazi imagery, including a Black Sun on his left elbow and an Iron Cross on his right hand. He had been reported in the past for domestic violence and animal abuse.

As of 3 September 2022, Sabag Montiel was detained in an isolated cell in a Federal Police facility and had refused to testify. His girlfriend, Brenda Uliarte, was detained on orders of the judge after an analysis of Sabag Montiel's movements, coupled with statements from a friend, concluded that he was allegedly with her on the night of the attempted assassination.

== Aftermath ==
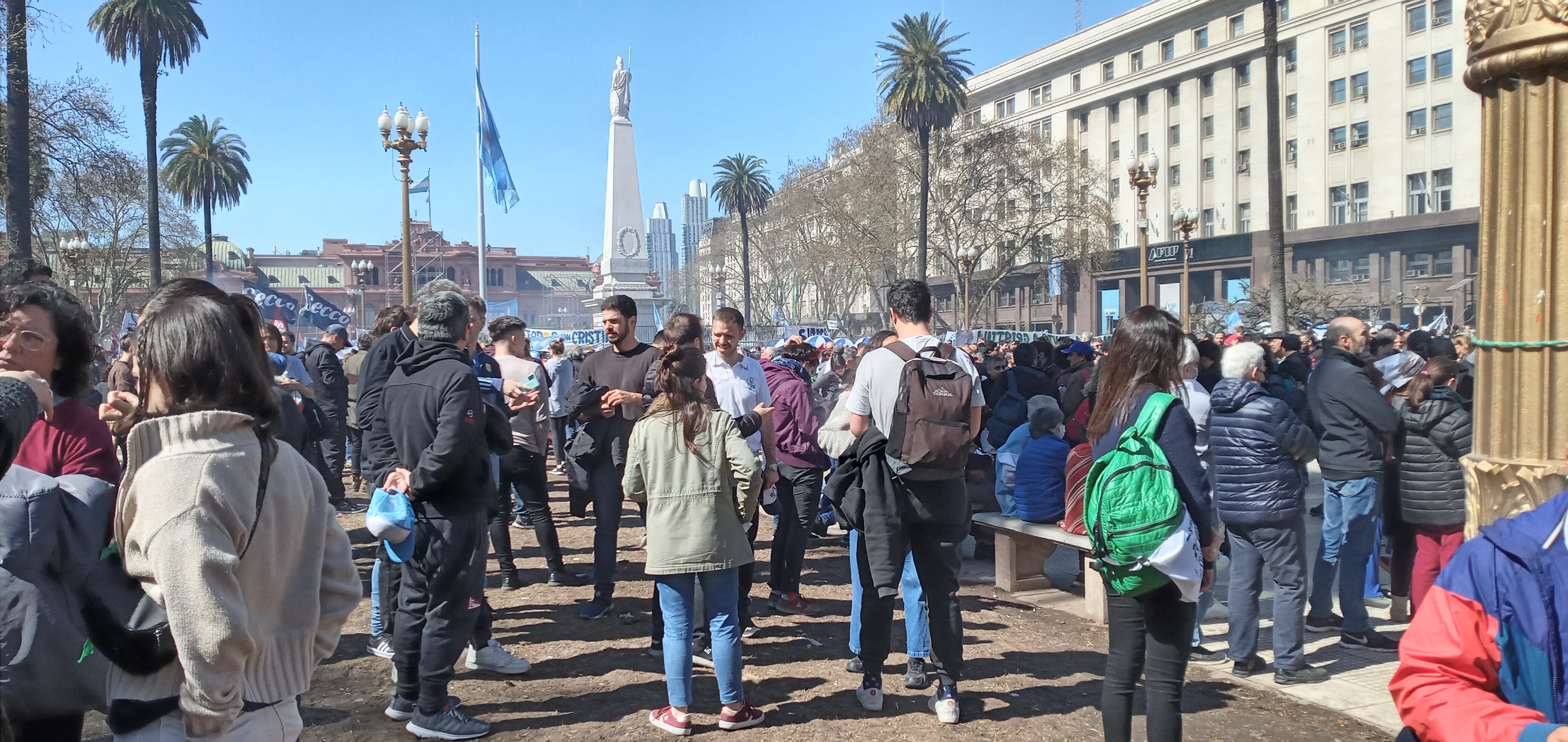
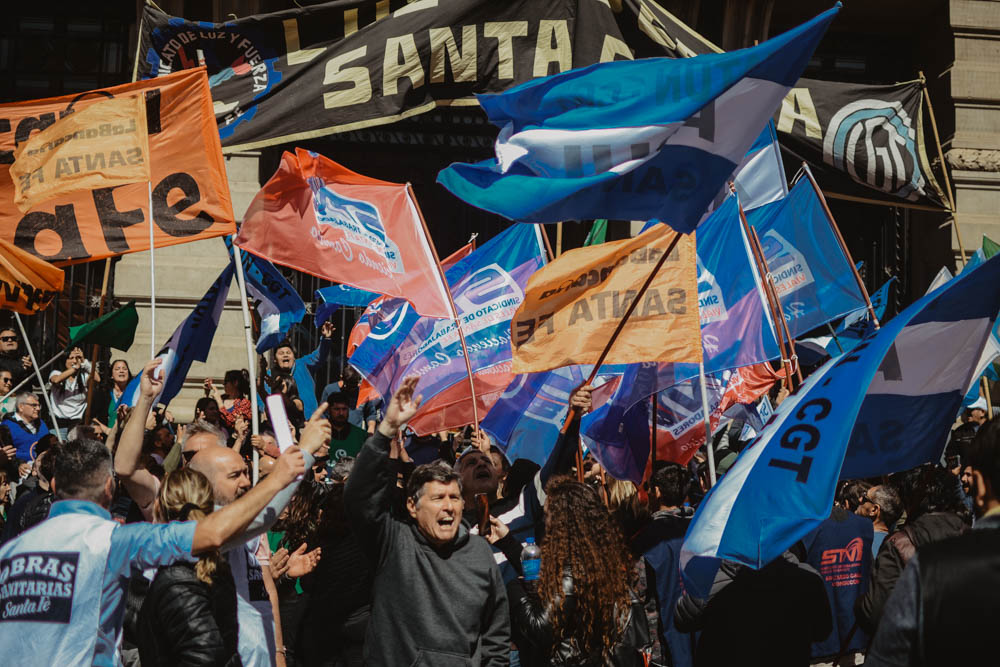
Demonstrations held in support of Fernández de Kirchner

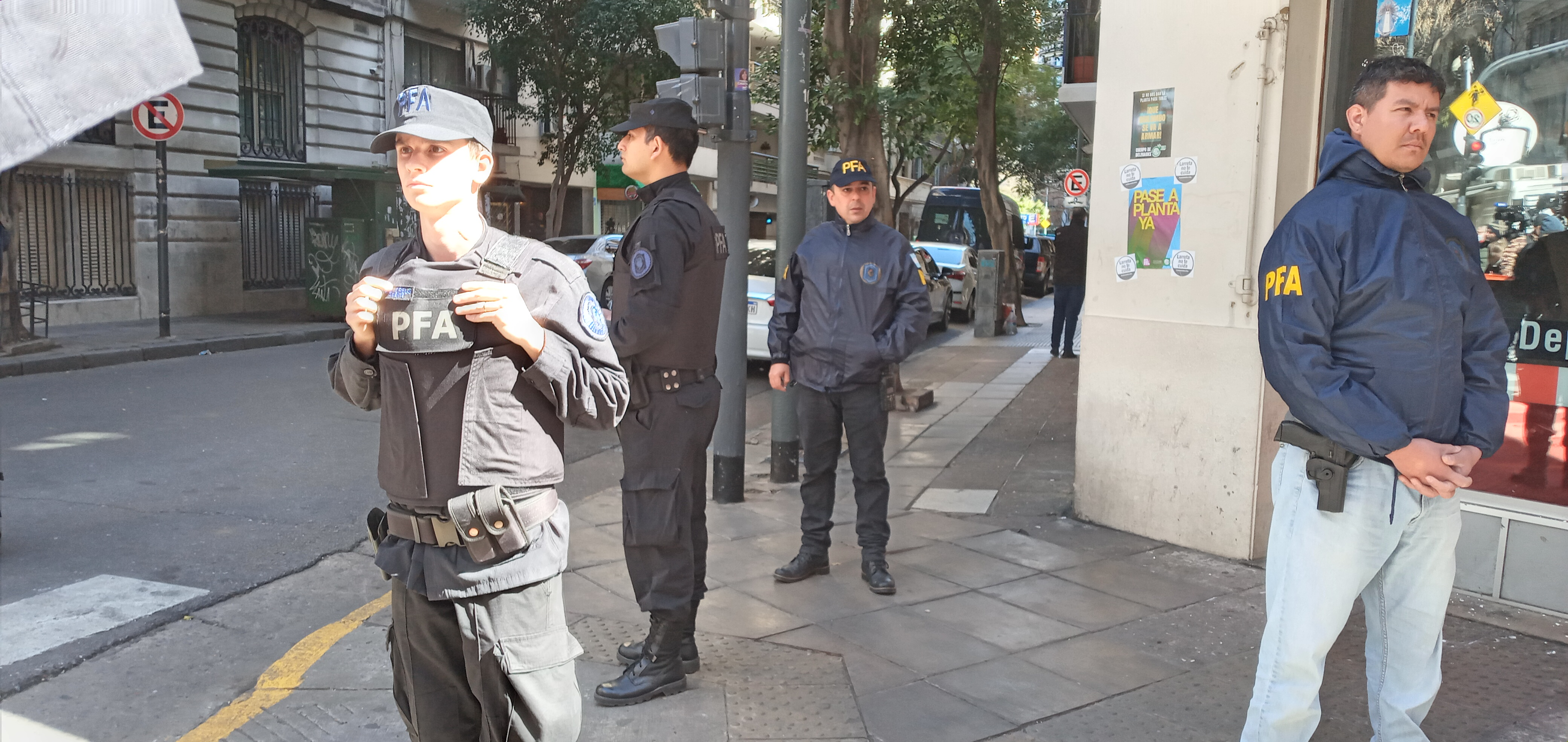
Officers from the Federal Police stand guard outside the house of Cristina Fernández de Kirchner the day after the assassination attempt.

President Alberto Fernández announced that the investigation would be led by federal judge María Eugenia Capuchetti, and the case prosecuted by Carlos Rívolo. The suspect would be defended against the charge of attempted homicide by public defender Juan Manuel Hermida. Initial investigations did not reveal any accomplices or ties of the suspect to an organisation behind the crime. A raid at the suspect's rented home in the Villa Zagala neighbourhood turned up about 100 bullets. The Argentine Senate set up a commission to investigate the attack.

In a cadena nacional a few hours after the incident, President Fernández said, "This is the most serious event since we recovered our democracy." He declared the following day a national holiday, which was ignored by the opposition-ruled provinces of Jujuy and Mendoza. The government called for its citizens to rally at Plaza de Mayo on 2 September in support of Fernández de Kirchner, resulting in huge crowds of demonstrators across Buenos Aires and other cities. Amongst the slogans used were "Enough hate" and "If they touch Cristina, what chaos we'll make".

Several foreign nations and government ministers—including former president Mauricio Macri—condemned the attempted assassination. A bipartisan draft resolution repudiating the attempted assassination was passed unanimously on 3 September by the Chamber of Deputies. The Republican Proposal (PRO) party, usually opponents of Fernández de Kirchner, voted for the resolution but left the chamber soon after. PRO leader Cristian Ritondo cited politicization of the events as the reason for walking out.

In a speech to Argentina's Chamber of Deputies, Javier Milei refused to consider the event as an assassination attempt. Many have even formulated conspiracy theories that the attempt was staged. The provincial deputy of Santa Fe, Amalia Granata, described it as a "pantomime". A similar opinion also appeared in an article by a Spanish journalist published by Libertad Digital. Political scientist Pedro Núñez from the Latin American Social Research Institute said in a statement to Deutsche Welle: "The justice system obviously has to act quickly, since the worst that could happen is that this is diluted over time and more and more conspiracy theories appear about what happened".

Nicolás Maduro, president of Venezuela, proposed that Argentina should have a law against hate speech similar to the Venezuelan one. Some Kirchnerist politicians, like Victoria Donda, blamed the attack on perceived hate speech from the media, the opposition, and the judiciary. Mayor Horacio Rodríguez Larreta rejected the proposal of a new law as an attempt to impose limits to the freedom of the press. During an interview with Perfil journalist Sam Forster, Amnesty International’s Argentina Director Mariela Belski also expressed concerns regarding the implementation of such a law: “[W]e must point out that in the face of this new and growing attention to this issue in Argentina, there is a risk that the broadness of the issue could lead to a hollowing out of its content. It is essential to make sense of what we mean by hate speech on the basis of international human rights standards in order to define in which exceptional cases it represents a reasonable limit to freedom of expression.” Casa Rosada spokeswoman Gabriela Cerruti pointed out that the government was not working on any draft bill over the topic.

== Trial ==
The trial began on 26 June 2024 at the Federal Court No. 6 in Buenos Aires, with three accused of attempted aggravated homicide and 270 witnesses called to testify. Fernández de Kirchner testified on 14 August. On 8 October 2025, Sabag Montiel was sentenced to 10 years' imprisonment.

== See also ==
- List of people who survived assassination attempts
