= White jihad =

Adoption by white supremacists of jihadist methods, narratives and aesthetics

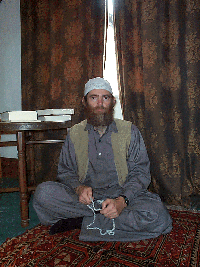
David Myatt, one of white jihad's main theoreticians.

White jihad is a political neologism for white supremacist adoption of jihadist methods, narratives, aesthetic, and culture.

Groups such as the Order of Nine Angles, National Action and Atomwaffen Division actively promote white jihad. Multiple individuals influenced by white jihad have been involved in planned terrorist attacks between 2020 and 2021.

== Definition ==
White jihad is a form of fused extremism exemplified by cases of white supremacist activists drawing on jihadism, methods, narratives and propaganda to promote their violent ideals and perpetrate terrorist attacks. According to academics Ariel Koch, Karine Nahon and Assaf Moghadam, white jihad represents a "clear and present danger". They trace the historical roots of white jihad to the relationship between Nazi dictator leader Adolf Hitler and Palestinian imam Amin al-Husseini during World War II, and to the ideals of racial separation shared between neo-Nazi George Lincoln Rockwell and Black Muslim leader Malcolm X.

White supremacism and jihadism converge on antisemitism, anti-Americanism, and opposition to liberal democracy and adopt similar propaganda narratives. Jihad and Islamist terrorism are romanticized by some white supremacist activists, while the Islamogram online jihadist community adopts propaganda elements from neo-Nazism and the alt-right. During the 2010s, methods of attack generally associated with jihadist terrorism began to be praised and adopted by white supremacists, such as suicide attacks and car-ramming attacks. For example, a member of neo-Nazi group Aryan Strikeforce planned a suicide attack against anti-fascists, while a French Generation Identity member evoked the idea of using his car to carry out a jihadist-style attack. Neo-Nazi Anders Behring Breivik also described al-Qaeda as "the most successful revolutionary movement" and originally planned to record the beheading of Norwegian Prime Minister Gro Harlem Brundtland. A growing adoption of the notion of the martyr also made its appearance among white supremacists, with neo-fascist accelerationists openly promoting the idea of "saints", analogous to the notion of the martyr in jihadism. Neo-Nazis have also adopted the Islamic suffix "Peace be upon him", when referring to their "saints".

== White sharia ==
Analogous to jihadists calling for sharia law, white supremacists call for "white sharia". Originally a meme born in 2016, white sharia is a concept developed by neo-Nazi, white supremacist and white nationalist groups, including The Daily Stormer website and blogger Sacco Vandal, with the aim of promoting a white patriarchy and the aim of countering what they call "socialist female hypergamy" because they believe it is threatening the white race. It refers to the domination of women by white men and it also refers to the control of women's sexuality, reproduction and daily lives, as well as a return to an extreme form of patriarchy within a white ethno-state, drawing on a distorted interpretation of Islamic sharia law. White sharia combines the fear that white men are losing control of white women with a fear of Islam and a fear of non-white men. This notion is opposed by some individuals and organizations within the white nationalist milieus because advocates of it have drawn inspiration from the "Islamic world".

White sharia advocates have argued for adopting polygamy, although they did not invent the concept in relation to the neo-Nazi movement. Several prominent neo-Nazis practiced polygamy, including David Lane, James Ellison, the leader of The Covenant, the Sword, and the Arm of the Lord and Chevie Kehoe the leader of the Aryan People’s Republic. Some Christian Identity publications have written in defense of it, for example Kingdom Identity Ministries. William Gayley Simpson also proposed adopting polygamy, which was already at the time compared to Islam by John Tyndall.

== Groups which promote white jihad ==
Logo of Atomwaffen Division.

During the 2000s, the neo-Nazi organization Aryan Nations expressed its support for jihadist terrorism and it also called for an "Aryan jihad" against the "Judaic tyrannical system". Since 2015, neo-Nazi terror groups National Action and Atomwaffen Division have promoted white jihad by adopting symbols, terminology and methods from Islamist extremism. National Action is linked to violent attack motivated by white jihad, such as the brutal attack on a Sikh man in 2015 in the United Kingdom. In France, influenced by the propaganda of Atomwaffen Division and al-Qaeda, two radicalized youths oscillating between jihadism and neo-Nazism have planned attacks between 2020 and 2021, until their arrest. In the United States, an individual active on platforms linked to the Islamic State and to white supremacism planned attacks in 2017.

Sergei Golubev, the leader of the Russian Blood & Honour also wrote of the need for the neo-Nazis to emulate the Caucasian Emirate and engage in an insurgent and bombing campaign against the Russian government. Golubev said that "many of us support Doku [Umarov]" and compared Movladi Udugov to Joseph Goebbels.

In Scandinavia, according to the Axess magasin, some "Islamists and neo-Nazis make common cause". Povl Riis-Knudsen, the previous leader of the Danish Nazi Party, son of an SS man, voiced his support for Islamic fundamentalism and even married a Palestinian Arab woman. Radio Islam owner Ahmed Rami has collaborated with the Nordic Resistance Movement, articles featuring him appearing in their newspaper, and Rami in turn promoting Mein Kampf on his station.

According to an article which was published in the Belgian daily newspaper L-Post, one of the most important groups which advocates white jihad is Feuerkrieg, which was founded in 2020 by an Estonian minor. In 2021, a British minor member of this group was arrested for a terrorist offence, thus, he was the youngest person to have been arrested for this offence in the United Kingdom. According to Il Giornale the Italian neo-Nazi "Nuovo Ordine Sociale-Sole Nero" was connected to jihadi terrorists. Allegedly a man from Bologna volunteered to fight in the Palestinian group Lions' Den and returned to Italy, and a Palestinian PLO member Zyad Abu Saleh built explosives for the group. Yevgeny Manyurov shot and killed two and injured five Federal Security Service (FSB) agents in a 2019 attack in Moscow. Manyurov shouted Islamic State slogans while shooting, but a raid on his house uncovered links to Atomwaffen Division Russland.

The Order of Nine Angles (O9A) is a Satanist neo-Nazi group which has played an important role in the promotion of the idea of white jihad. Its supposed ideologue David Myatt attempted to synthesize far-right ideas with Islam, calling for a jihad against Jews and Americans. However, according to academic Jacob Christiansen Senholt, for Myatt, neo-Nazi and Islamist ideologies are only a way of subverting radical activists to serve his Satanist agenda. In June 2020, an American soldier was charged with passing sensitive information to an O9A-inspired group, with the aim of passing it to members of Hurras al-Din. Atomwaffen Division itself was inspired by O9A.

Many accelerationist neo-Nazi groups voiced their support for the Islamic Republic of Iran in the 2026 Iran war. These groups disseminated propaganda posters with the text "WE ARE WITH YOU IRAN! FROM THE BELLY OF THE BEAST!" with Nazi flags and the flag of Iran and SUMKA side by side. Even the prominent ideologue of Neo-Nazi accelerationism James Mason wrote that "We wish the people of the Middle East good luck in regaining control over their homelands, through whatever means it may take to accomplish".

== See also ==
- August Kreis, supporter of Jihadist-Nazi alliance
- Ahmed Huber, neo-Nazi, convert to Islam and funder of Al Qaeda
- Constitutional Right Party, Finnish nationalist party that was linked to both skinheads and Mujahideen
- François Genoud, Swiss Nazi and funder of Jihadist and neo-Nazi groups
- Joshua Caleb Sutter, "Minister for Islamic Liaison" of the Aryan Nations
- RaHoWa, white supremacist slogan coined to be an equivalent of jihad
- Red–green–brown alliance, an alliance of leftists (red), Islamists (green), and the far right (brown).
