= Amalia Granata =

Argentine politician (born 1981)

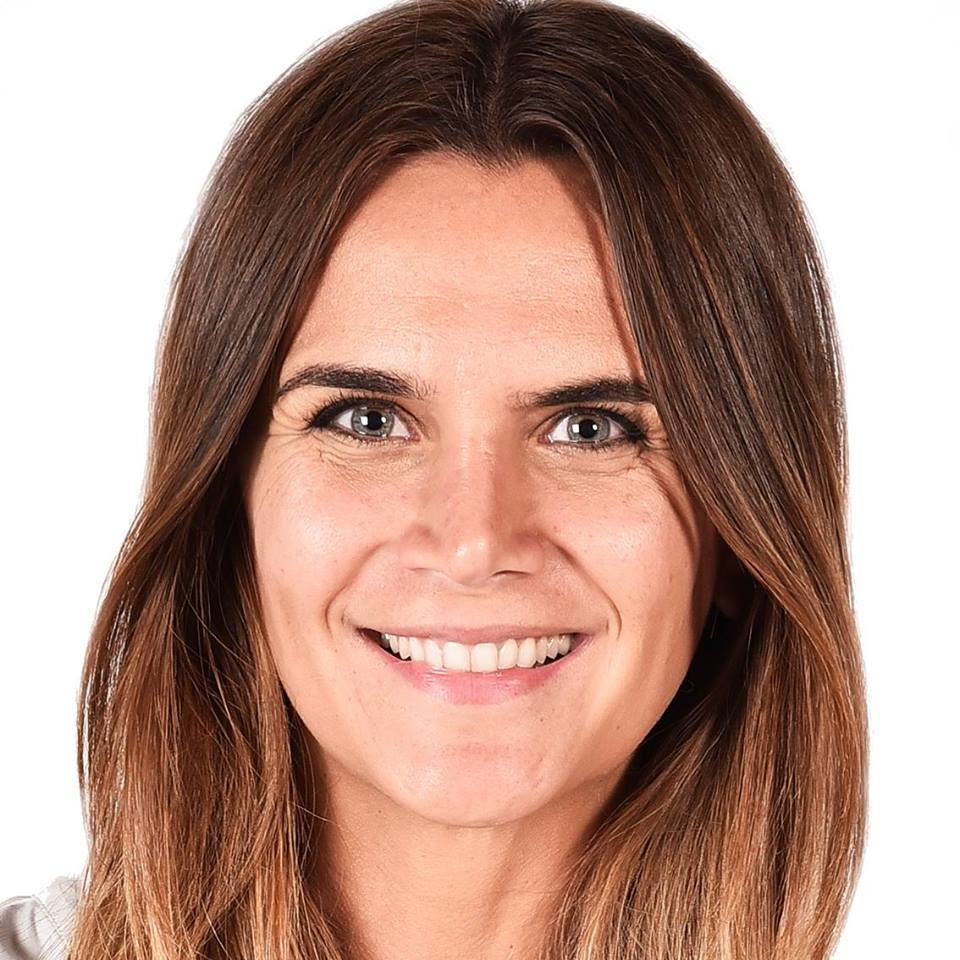
- Granata in 2019

Provincial Deputy of Santa Fe
- Incumbent
- Assumed office 11 December 2019

Personal details
- Born: 26 February 1981 (age 45) Rosario, Santa Fe, Argentina
- Party: Independent
- Other political affiliations: Juntos por el Cambio (2021); Unite por la Libertad y la Dignidad (2019–2021; 2023–present)
- Spouse: Leonardo Squarzon
- Children: 2
- Occupation: model, politician

Amalia Granata (born 26 February 1981) is an Argentine model and politician. She became a Provincial Deputy in Santa Fe Province in 2019.

== Personal life ==
In mid-2007, she went to live in Romania with her then boyfriend, footballer Cristian Fabbiani. A few months later she returned to Argentina, separated from Fabbiani, while she was pregnant with daughter Uma, who was born in 2008 in Rosario.

In February 2016, she began a relationship with businessman Leonardo Squarzon. A month after the courtship, she revealed that she was pregnant and their son Roque was born in December. The couple was about to separate over Squarzon's infidelity, but stayed together.

== Career ==
She began her television career when she confessed to having had sex with Robbie Williams on television when he was on tour with his 2003 Tour of Argentina in November 2004.

Granata worked during the Viña del Mar 2006 Festival as a TV host. She participated in a segment called MisionSex of the Chilean REC program and modeled clothes for Chilean magazines and portals.

In May 2007 she joined the reality show Hermano Famosos. She was the first expelled from the game with 54% of the votes.

Between 2009 and 2010 she was a panelist on A Perfect World and posed nude for the Argentine edition of Playboy magazine. She was in the sixth edition of the Argentine tournament called Bailando 2010.

During 2017 and she worked as a panelist on Pamela in the afternoon.In 2018 she was a panelist of Every Afternoon but was dismissed by a controversial tweet about the death of María Eugenia Laprida.

== Politics ==
In 2019, after an intense electoral campaign and anti-abortion activism, she ran as a candidate for Provincial Representative. Her participation in the political scene had begun before with a smaller party. After the campaign against the legalization of abortion in 2018, Ola Celeste (blue wave), Granata joined a group of politicians supporting these principles and against gender ideology. In addition to various proposals of liberal and humanist court, the Somos Vida party of the Unite for Life and Family electoral front was presented at the primary elections in Santa Fe with provincial representatives and senators and some mayors and councilors obtaining over 140 thousand votes. Granata became the third most voted candidate, after Socialist and Change.

Obtaining around 290 thousand votes, Granata, constitutional lawyer Nicolás Mayoraz and evangelist Walter Ghione along with 4 others became Representatives of the Province of Santa Fe taking office on 10 December 2019.
