= National Action (UK) =

Banned British neo-Nazi organisation

- Founders: Benjamin Raymond; Alex Davies
- Leader: Christopher Lythgoe
- Founded: 2013
- Split from: British National Party
- Headquarters: Warrington, United Kingdom
- Ideology: British fascism; Ultranationalism; Neo-fascism; Neo-Nazism; Antisemitism; Islamophobia; Homophobia; Far-right accelerationism
- Political position: Far-right
- Status: Banned organisation
- Size: 60–100 (2016 estimate)

National Action is a British far-right fascist and neo-Nazi organisation based in Warrington. Founded in 2013, the group is secretive, and has rules to prevent members from talking about it openly. It has been a proscribed organisation in the United Kingdom under the Terrorism Act 2000 since 16 December 2016, the first far-right group to be proscribed since the Second World War. In March 2017, an undercover investigation by ITV found that its members were still meeting in secret. Neil Basu, former head of UK counterterrorism policing, described Active Club England as its successor. It is believed that after its proscription, National Action organised itself in a similar way to the also-banned Salafi jihadist Al-Muhajiroun network.

== History ==
National Action was founded in late 2013, after the decline of the British National Party (BNP) and English Defence League. The group was founded by Benjamin Raymond and Alex Davies, who were university students. Raymond refers to Davies as the founder of National Action and says he became involved after Davies. Activists who later joined National Action met on websites such as Iron March and 4chon. 4chon was created in 2011 when 4chan's administration deleted its /new/ board.

Davies joined the BNP Youth at 16, but found the group to be in "disarray". He describes the difference between the two groups as, "We're targeting universities regularly. That's something the BNP never had. We've built something in a few months the BNP didn't have in 20 years." Raymond and Davies considered the BNP to be a failure, and their analysis of the BNP's decline as a "moderate" far-right group, was key in their conception of National Action as a neo-Nazi organisation.

Early into the organisation's existence, actions focused on street activism. Tactics included leafletting, banner drops and protests. Some of these were organised alongside activists from the British Movement, another neo-Nazi organisation which largely collapsed in the 1980s.

Davies withdrew from a first-year course in philosophy at the University of Warwick in June 2014 after his involvement in National Action was revealed. A university spokesman said, "Any such allegations are taken seriously." Davies has been described as the National Front's "deputy and front man".

Due to the secretive nature of National Action, it is not clear who the leadership of the organisation are. Former National Front member Ashley Bell (pseudonym Tommy Johnson) has been referred to as the organisation's leader, and is thought to be one of a number of activists behind National Action's founding document. Other individuals indicated to be former or current leaders in the organisation include Wayne Bell, Mark James, Kevin Layzell, Ben Raymond and Alex Davies.

According to an investigation by the Daily Mirror, Benjamin Raymond (age 25 in June 2014) went on to lead the organisation. He is a former double-glazing salesman who graduated with a degree in politics from the University of Essex in 2013. By 2014, he had written on his blog, "There are non-whites and Jews in my country who all need to be exterminated. As a teenager, Mein Kampf changed my life. I am not ashamed to say I love Hitler." He has expressed admiration for Anders Breivik, the far-right terrorist, as "the hero Norway deserves". Raymond told BBC News in 2015 that "The source of all of the conflict in society is all the different racial groups that have been brought here. They have been brought here to create a people who are deracinated and easier to control."

"Tom", a member who was 18 years old at the time, was interviewed by The Huffington Post in March 2014. He named José Antonio Primo de Rivera of the Spanish Falange, Alexander Raven Thomson and Oswald Mosley of the British Union of Fascists, and writer Wyndham Lewis as inspiration for National Action. The group's strategy document twice quoted Adolf Hitler, which "Tom" called "a bit dodgy". He explained it by saying "What has been a successful nationalist movement? Oh it was [the Nazis] ... That's why we're using [the Nazis]. They used it and they were able to gain power ... Gottfried Feder, who was an economist and a member of the NSDAP, he had some good ideas".

== Legal incidents ==
Jack Renshaw, a former Youth BNP activist and a senior spokesperson for the organisation, faced criminal charges over incitement to racial hatred, with his trial scheduled for 2 January 2018. Renshaw had called for Jews to be "eradicated" as "nature's financial parasite and nature's social vermin", and had said that the UK had backed the wrong side in the Second World War, since the Nazis "were there to remove Jewry from Europe once and for all". A person who had committed those same offences, whose name cannot be legally published in the UK, was found guilty at Preston Crown Court of inciting racial hatred on 8 January 2018.

In November 2017, six people – 31-year-old Christopher Lythgoe, from Warrington, Garron Helm, 24, of Seaforth, Merseyside; Matthew Hankinson, 23, of Newton-le-Willows, Merseyside; and Andrew Clarke, 33, and Michael Trubini, 35, both of Warrington, along with Jack Renshaw, were charged with being members of National Action, which is banned in the UK. Two of the men, Lythgoe and Renshaw, were also charged with being involved in a plot to murder the West Lancashire MP Rosie Cooper with a machete, and of threatening to kill a police officer. In July 2017, a former National Action member, Robbie Mullen, reported the plot to an anti-racism organisation, which reported the matter to the police.

The six faced trial on 11 June 2018 at the Old Bailey in London. The next day, Renshaw pleaded guilty to plotting to murder Rosie Cooper, and to threatening to kill a police officer. The following month, Hankinson and Lythgoe were found guilty of being members of National Action and jailed for six years and eight years, respectively. The presiding judge, Mr Justice Jay, told Hankinson, "You are a neo-Nazi who glorifies and revels in a perverted ideology, has a deep hatred of ethnic minorities and Jews and has advocated violence to achieve your objectives." Helm was found not guilty of being a member of the group and Lythgoe was found not guilty of encouragement to murder for allegedly giving Renshaw permission to kill Ms Cooper on behalf of the group. The jury was unable to reach a verdict on Trubini and Clarke.

According to the BBC and The Independent, six people – five men and a woman – were arrested in co-ordinated raids by the West Midlands Counter Terrorism Unit, and were charged with being members of National Action. The six – Nathan Pryke, 26, from Cambridge; Adam Thomas, 21, and Claudia Patatas, 38, both of Banbury, Oxfordshire; Darren Fletcher, 28, of Wednesfield, Wolverhampton; Daniel Bogunovic, 26, of Leicester; and Joel Wilmore, 24, of Hazel Grove, Stockport – appeared in court in January 2018 and entered pleas of not guilty. All except Patatas gave their nationality as British; Patatas is Portuguese. Several of the group also faced additional charges. Thomas, Patatas and Bogunovic were convicted in November 2018. (see below) In December 2018, the six received prison sentences of between five and six-and-a-half years.

Two National Action members were imprisoned for eight years each at the Crown Court in Birmingham. In March 2018, Corporal Mikko Vehvilainen, 34, was described as a recruiter for National Action, a key part of whose strategy was to expand its membership within the armed forces. A self-confessed racist who believes in a coming "race war", Vehvilainen wanted to establish an all-white stronghold in the Welsh village of Llansilin. When arrested at his house there, police found a photograph of him giving a Nazi salute at a 1917 memorial to his native Finland's independence and an arsenal of weapons and swastika bunting. Another soldier, Private Mark Barrett, like Vehvilainen a member of the 2nd Battalion Royal Anglian Regiment, was acquitted but is believed to have been dismissed by the Army. Alexander Deakin, 24, unemployed, was the Midlands regional organiser. He was seen on CCTV putting up racist stickers at Aston University. Deakin spread racist propaganda from his bedroom at his parents' house, telling fellow National Action members via encrypted chat that in a future "race war" they would have a "KKK-themed death squad", alluding to notorious American group the Ku Klux Klan. He bragged that counter-terrorism officers were incompetent and would never catch him, but he was found hiding in a cupboard when he was arrested. He was sentenced in April 2018.

In May 2018, Wayne Bell, described as a "poster boy" for the organisation, pleaded guilty to two counts of stirring up racial hatred and three counts of possessing multiple items in order to destroy or damage property. The court heard that he had written neo-Nazi graffiti on pillars and lamp posts in his home town of Castleford, and that he had made hundreds of racist and antisemitic posts on Twitter and the Russian social media site VKontakte. He was sentenced to four years and three months in prison.

In March 2020, four people – Alice Cutter, 23, Mark Jones, 25, both of Sowerby Bridge, West Yorkshire; Garry Jack, 24, of Shard End, Birmingham; and Connor Scothern, 19, of Nottingham – were convicted of membership of National Action. In June 2020, Cutter, Jones and Jack were sentenced to prison for terms of between three and five-and-a-half years, while Scothern was to be detained in youth custody for 18 months. The court heard that Cutter took part in a "Miss Hitler" beauty pageant as "Miss Buchenwald".

In April 2021, a serving Metropolitan Police officer, Benjamin Hannam, was convicted of membership of a proscribed organisation, two counts of fraud by false representation, two counts of possession of documents likely to be of use to a terrorist and possession of a prohibited image of children. He was sentenced to four years and four months in prison. Hannam had attended National Action meetings in 2016 and 2017 before joining the police force, claiming to have had no connections to the far-right.

In late April 2021, National Action's co-founder, Benjamin Raymond, was charged with alleged offences relating to his activities in the organisation, including membership in the group after it was declared a terrorist organisation by the British government. In November 2021 he was found guilty of being a member of a banned terrorist organisation, possessing a manifesto by Anders Breivik and a guide to homemade detonators.

== Policy and actions ==
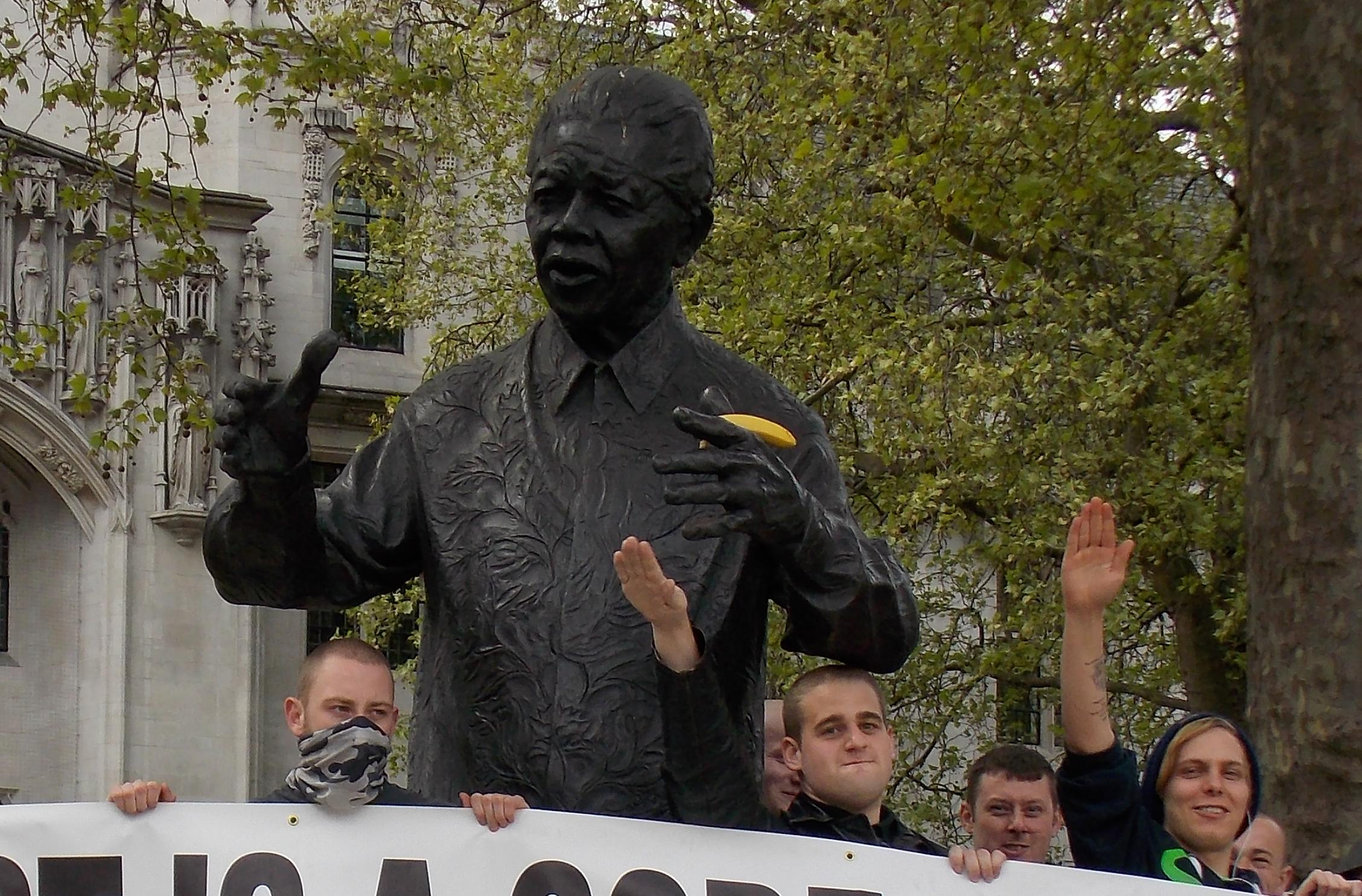
National Action held a protest at the statue of Nelson Mandela in London in 2014, defacing it with a banana.

Davies described the group as "like the BNP but more radical". National Action self-styles itself as a "revolutionary nationalist" organisation which grew out of a failed offshoot within the youth wing of the British National Party and has made effective, large-scale use of social media and blogging platforms.

National Action has been described as racist, antisemitic, and homophobic. It wanted to reintroduce Section 28, which prohibited the "promotion of homosexuality" by local councils. On immigration, "Tom" said, "With coloured people we'd say big no to them coming over. But with [white people] we'd be a bit more lenient."

The group distributed its material on at least 12 university campuses. In an interview with The National Student in 2014, an anonymous organiser for National Action explained why they target universities. "Very soon they are going to find out just how hard the system has screwed them – if they knew what we know now we would have an army. The last Labour government aspired to send 50% of 18- to 21-year-olds to university and the total student population has grown exponentially over the past decade. That is 50% of youth who are going to be very angry burger flippers." He also promised, "This year will be a reign of terror," and described people who are in interracial relationships as "pathetic internet nerds who can't get laid and STD-infested sluts".

In October 2014, Garron Helm, a National Action member from Merseyside, was sentenced to four weeks in prison for sending a message via Twitter to MP Luciana Berger relating to her Jewish background, which was found to be "an offensive, indecent or obscene message". "I'm not a lunatic for embracing martyrdom, I've just accepted that I could be more use in death than life", he wrote in early 2015. Helm served two weeks of his sentence before being released. In November 2014, ten National Action activists were arrested in dawn raids on suspicion of conspiring to cause criminal damage to Berger's office; they were all bailed. No further action was taken against them. National Action's campaign against Berger was supported by the US-based neo-Nazi website The Daily Stormer, which offered advice on how to set up untraceable Twitter accounts in order to send abuse.

In March 2015, National Action organised a "White Man March" on the Quayside in Newcastle upon Tyne during which police arrested nine people; those attending included North East representatives of the British National Party (BNP) and neo-Nazis from Eastern Europe. In June the same year, 26-year-old Zack Davies, who told police that he was a member of National Action, was found guilty of the attempted murder of Sarandev Bhambra, a Sikh man and trainee dentist, in Mold, Flintshire. Dr Bhambra was struck in the head and nearly lost a hand in the attack, suffering "life changing injuries". Davies claimed this was revenge for the murder of Lee Rigby and chanted "white power" as he launched the attack. Davies was given a life sentence the following September, and is to serve 14 years before being considered for parole. National Action publicly denied any association with Davies or his actions.

In August 2015, the group attempted to hold a second "White Man March" in Liverpool. Strong opposition from the Anti-Fascist Network and local activists forced the organisers to cancel the march and take refuge in the lost luggage collection point at Lime Street Station. Tensions were raised by a letter to Mayor Joe Anderson threatening race riots; National Action claimed this was a forgery by an agent provocateur.

In November 2016, The Sunday Times reported that "fears that far-right activists may be grooming a new generation of Hitler Youth in the UK emerged" after stickers from National Action proclaiming parts of Liverpool to be a "Nazi-controlled zone" appeared. The group also held a number of marches and demonstrations on Armistice Day and Remembrance Sunday proclaiming that "Hitler was right", and celebrated the election of Donald Trump as President-elect of the United States under the slogan of "white power".

National Action has called for a "white jihad" to "cleanse Britain of parasites" using leaflets, stickers and video. Members of the group stated in speeches that there was a "disease of international Jewry", and that "when the time comes they'll be in the chambers".

In 2015 Benjamin Raymond had a lengthy stay in Finland with the Nordic Resistance Movement, which would likewise be banned as a terror group. Raymond was pictured posing with an assault rifle in Helsinki with NRM members during the trip.

== Responses ==
"Tom" reported that the group was monitored by the West Midlands Counter Terrorism Unit. Gerry Gable, former editor of the anti-fascist magazine Searchlight, said, "National Action are highly organised with a lot of foreign money backing them up. They're not looking to attract thickos who just want a fight. They want thinkers who are prepared to die for National Socialism." Scotland Yard was reported to be "very concerned" by the group, but gave an official response that "We cannot discuss details of individuals or organisations that may or may not be the subject of an investigation."

Ian Austin, a Labour Party MP whose adoptive father fled Nazi-occupied Czechoslovakia, said of National Action, "Seventy years ago, British heroes were fighting to liberate Europe from the scourge of Nazis and fascism. It's absolutely disgusting to see young British people praise Hitler today."

On 5 September 2017, it was reported that four serving male members of the British Army had been arrested under the Terrorism Act 2000 on suspicion of being members of National Action: a 22-year-old from Birmingham, a 32-year-old from Powys, a 24-year-old from Ipswich and a 24-year-old from Northampton. A fifth man was reported to have been detained in Cyprus. As a result, three men, including two British soldiers, were charged with terrorism offences. On 27 September 2017, eleven men were arrested in further raids across England and Wales.

On 3 January 2018, six people – five men from Cambridge, Banbury, Wolverhampton, Leicester and Stockport, and a woman from Banbury – were arrested on suspicion of being concerned in the commission, preparation and instigation of acts of terrorism, namely on suspicion of being a member of a proscribed organisation, National Action. Those arrested were aged between 21 and 37.

== Lead-up to and proscription as a terrorist organisation ==
In November 2016, The Sunday Times reported that National Action was supporting Thomas Mair, the murderer of the Batley and Spen Labour MP Jo Cox, posting "only 649 MPs to go!" on social media. National Action also supported Mair personally, saying, "Don't let this man's sacrifice go in vain", and altered its listing on Google to state, "Death to traitors, freedom for Britain!", a slogan Mair had said to a court when asked to give his name following Cox's murder. The organisation also supported the Orlando nightclub shooting and has called for graphic and violent attacks on police officers in the UK. Mair, however, appeared to have little involvement with National Action or any other white supremacist groups within the UK.

Before it was banned, the organisation was the most active in Yorkshire, where half of the referrals to the government's anti-extremism strategy have been about the far-right. In October, The Jewish Chronicle reported that the organisation's leaflets "including swastikas, a Nazi salute and the phrase 'no tolerance'" were spotted in Hull, Liverpool, Glasgow, and Cardiff. The Hull Daily Mail reported, "The first evidence of the group in the city was in July when graffiti appeared on a wall on George Street in the city centre with an incorrectly painted Swastika, the letters NA and a logo." In a newsletter, National Action claimed that although the group was "not entirely sure who could of [sic] done" the graffiti, "it seems we have got quite a following in Hull, with graffiti (even though backwards) of swastikas and an attempt at our logo and the initials NA popping up around Hull and triggering the reactionary left."

National Action has promoted the antisemitic conspiracy theories that Jews were behind the September 11 attacks and has labelled Cox the "patron saint" of grooming gangs, according to The Sunday Times. At a secret meeting of the Yorkshire Forum, Renshaw said (in a video seen by The Times) that they need to adopt a "killer instinct". According to him, "As nationalists we need to learn from the mistakes of the national socialists and we need to realise that, no, you do not show the Jew mercy."

The group was proscribed as a terrorist organisation under the Terrorism Act 2000, making it a criminal offence to support or be a member after 16 December 2016. In laying an order for National Action's proscription, the Home Secretary, Amber Rudd, described the group as "a racist, antisemitic and homophobic organisation which stirs up hatred, glorifies violence and promotes a vile ideology". National Action is the first far-right organisation to be proscribed in the UK since the now-defunct British Union of Fascists in the 1940s. National Action is one of only four terrorist organisations based in Great Britain to be proscribed (one being the Sonnenkrieg Division, a splinter of the System Resistance Network (a National Action alias), and the other two being radical Islamist organisations). Its ban was seen as an acknowledgement by the UK government that the far-right was on the rise, and figures released by the National Police Chiefs' Council show that the number of far-right referrals to the anti-terror Prevent programme increased from 323 cases in 2014–15 to 561 in 2015–16. It is believed that after its proscription, National Action organised itself in a similar way to the also-banned Salafi jihadist Al-Muhajiroun network.

== Aliases ==
=== Scottish Dawn ===
Suspicion that some National Action followers simply swapped membership of National Action for membership of the group Scottish Dawn, in order to circumvent the ban, prompted the Home Office to consider whether the new group should be outlawed too. Scottish Dawn was established shortly after National Action was banned and described itself as a "new Identitarian social movement formed from various organisations in 2017 to develop a coherent conception of Scottish identity and secure its place within Scottish politics".

On 28 September 2017, after eleven suspected members across the country were arrested, the government announced that Scottish Dawn would be proscribed as an alias of National Action.

=== NS131 ===
NS131 (National Socialist Anti-Capitalist Action) was "a platform dedicated to promoting and spreading NS street art and physical propaganda" according to its website. On 28 September 2017, the government announced that NS131 would be banned as an alias of National Action.

=== System Resistance Network ===
Flag of the System Resistance Network

System Resistance Network (SRN) is a group that is believed to have been putting up homophobic and anti-refugee posters in Dundee, Swansea, Cardiff and Bristol, and is claimed to be another alias of National Action. SRN was formerly known as Vanguard Britannia, the British chapter of American alt-right, neo-Nazi group Vanguard America. Former members of the SRN are suspected to have been involved in the creation of the Sonnenkrieg Division, an offshoot of the American neo-Nazi terrorist organisation the Atomwaffen Division.

SRN was proscribed as an alias of National Action on 25 February 2020.

In June 2021, Andrew Dymock a neo-Nazi student associated with SRN was found guilty of terror and hate offences.

=== TripleK Mafia ===
During the 2018 trial of three people for being members of National Action, it emerged that a successor organisation named the TripleK Mafia had been set up by the defendants. This rebrand was made in an attempt to "shed one skin for another"; the name was another reference to the American white supremacist group, the Ku Klux Klan. The group name was misspelled as "TrippleK" four times in new posters by member Joel Wilmore. Two of the defendants in the trial, Adam Thomas, 22, and Claudia Patatas, 38, had given their baby the middle name Adolf, and posed for photographs with the child while dressed in KKK robes and with swastika flags. The third defendant was a "prominent member of National Action's Midlands chapter", Daniel Bogunovic, 27. All three were convicted after a seven-week trial at the Crown Court in Birmingham.

== In popular culture ==
The ITV drama, The Walk-In, tells the story of the National Action plot to behead then-MP Rosie Cooper (now chair of an NHS Foundation Trust).

== See also ==
- Combat 18 (C18), a British neo-Nazi organisation whose members are banned from joining the police or the Prison Service.
- National Socialist Underground (NSU), a German neo-Nazi group
- Nordic Resistance Movement, a pan-Nordic neo-Nazi group with ties to National Action
- Secret society
