= Harassment Architecture =

2019 novella by Mike Ma

- Cover
- Author: Mike Ma
- Language: English
- Publisher: Self-published
- Publication date: 2019
- Pages: 146
- ISBN: 978-1-79564-149-4
- OCLC: 1110014277
- Followed by: Gothic Violence

Harassment Architecture is a 2019 novella that was self-published and written by writer Mike Ma. A sequel, Gothic Violence, was published in 2021. It follows an unnamed protagonist, a racist insomniac with violent tendencies, who embarks on a campaign to destroy the world. Some sections are narrative, while others are more ranting or political discourse. It is popular among the online far-right.

The book contains ecofascist, white nationalist, and militant accelerationist themes and content. It contains scenes of extreme violence, as well as extreme misogyny and racism; it criticizes modernity and progressivism, promoting violence as the only solution, and has gained popularity among right-wing accelerationists.

== Background and publication history ==
Harassment Architecture was self-published by Mike Ma in 2019. Mike Ma is the pen name of far-right internet influencer Mike Mahoney, a former Breitbart writer for Glittering Steel and former associate of Milo Yiannopoulos. Ma is also the founder of the Pine Tree Party accelerationist movement, founded in 2017, which had previously brought him prominence among ecofascists. He is a militant accelerationist, and has been outspoken in his praise for the Unabomber Ted Kaczynski.

Harassment Architecture was advertised in Raw Egg Nationalist's magazine Man's World, as was its sequel. Ma described Harassment Architecture as "more of a mental breakdown than a story". In 2021, Ma published a sequel, Gothic Violence; the plot of that book centers on a group of terrorist surfers taking over Florida.

== Summary ==
The book begins with an author's note declaring that "if you came here expecting coherent plot or structure, you bought or stole the wrong book." The novella's protagonist is an unnamed white man in his early 20s. He works at an unspecified job and regularly goes without sleeping for days on end due to insomnia; as a result, he frequently loses track of time and his own train of thought. He is a self-avowed racist and accelerationist who despises the state of the world (what he calls the "lowerworld"), particularly technological advancement and progressivism, and is prone to violent fantasies. His self descriptions are inconsistent and he is often unclear about how much of what he is experiencing is real. The narrative, largely made up of various isolated incidents, is interrupted by the narrator's constant daydreams, hallucinations, and commentary on various political and cultural topics.

The book begins with him playing Richard Wagner's music loudly in his car, "with the windows down, mostly because I want the people at this red light to think I'm a cultured guy". He harasses a woman and then gets into a car accident. The narrative shifts to a concert he must attend with his friends; he says they are not his real friends because he cannot be "racist, sexist, or myself around them". While at the concert, he begins fantasizing about murdering everyone there, before his fantasy is interrupted by a girl who flirts with him; broken out of his fantasy, he leaves and decides to abandon all of his friends for good. Another day, he has a pleasant discussion with a leftist woman who does not know his political views, and imagines the results if she knew what he was actually like.

The protagonist narrates the life of a depressed woman whom he stalks, who accidentally kills herself when the narrator breaks into her apartment. He kills one of his friends by tipping a bookcase onto her; he claims it was self-defense, and there are no apparent consequences. His sleep deprivation and hallucinations worsen to the point where he is no longer sure if he is dreaming or awake. He gets into another car accident and almost dies, resulting in delirium as he heals. He leaves America under unclear circumstances and returns with several thousand dollars.

At the end of the narrative, the following events are clearly real: the narrator decides that he will attempt to cause as much harm to the world as he can. He first kills several people by throwing rocks through their windshields, leading to a pileup car accident. His campaign escalates to mass murder and widespread terrorism and attracts followers, declaring war on the world; to a real but unclear extent, the narrator succeeds in severely disrupting the government and status quo. He is arrested and briefly concludes the experience was a daydream, hallucinating further that he sees Lucifer speaking to him, before his followers break him out of jail and he gives a speech advocating accelerationism. The book ends with the narrator proclaiming all the things he has seen both God and demons in, concluding that "I saw God and he told me to burn it all down".

== Themes and ideology ==
Harassment Architecture espouses ecofascist, white nationalist and identitarian views. The novel contains militant accelerationist themes, and promotes the targeting of infrastructure in order to destabilize society. It, as well as its sequel, espouses several conspiracy theories, including that of the Great Replacement, as well as antisemitism and anti-vaccination ideas. The book includes scenes where the protagonist suggests that he has shot up a gay nightclub, as well as attacks on ethnic minorities, the poor, and transgender people. It also focuses substantially on diet and physical fitness, which are part of the "transformation" the protagonist undergoes.

Jenny Rice noted it as "filled with White nationalist imagery, brutal sexual violence, and gory fantasies of killing anyone who is not a straight White man". Helen Young described it as including vitriolic, dehumanizing, and violent language against groups often targeted by far-right extremists, as well as several pages describing violent attacks against them. The Southern Poverty Law Center classed it as "standard fare within the radical right", calling it an "accelerationist fantasy". Alex Amend said the work was full of "brutal violence, racism and misogyny". Helen Young and Geoff Boucher described the book as a "fictionalized lone wolf rage fantasy" that justified hate crimes in what the book portrayed as a "degenerate civilization", targeting typical "culture war" topics like political correctness, mixed-race relationships and sexual harassment laws.

The book's narrator maligns nihilism and irony, and suggests that if the reader is a nihilist, they channel it into something "productive" through violence, either killing other people or getting themself killed, sarcastically suggesting that they "especially do not" destroy power stations without getting caught. The novella bemoans technocracy ruining the chance of man to live a genuine life, with the protagonist expressing the desire to live in the "purity" of nature and calling the existence of industrialized man a "violent preface to his looming and inescapable consequence. The final consequence." Macklin argues that the thoughts expressed in the book are "broadly congruent" with the Unabomber Ted Kaczynski's civilizational critiques and the negative affects civilization could have on many aspects of life, including personal autonomy and freedom. It views the solution to this as being found in nature, which towards the end of the book the protagonist declares has always won.

Harassment Architecture criticizes the apathetic and nihilistic outlook of the modern world, which in its view has killed beauty; as a consequence the modern world must be burned down. Harassment Architecture lists by name several mass murderers in its discussion of aesthetics of violence, saying that each has been forgiven "simply by looking good". The book's narrator argues that mass murder is the solution to the perceived terror of modernity, part of the book's general position that violence is the only solution for many problems. One analysis argued its core message was a "concretized hatred for all that maintains society".

== Style ==
The book is disordered in structure and many events do not directly follow one another, instead jumping from one to the other. Several chapters are short, some not more than a single paragraph. The book is written in a fragmented and sometimes hallucinatory manner, with the protagonist often daydreaming, hallucinating or fantasizing, with this not made distinct from the rest of the story. Several commentators have compared it to the 1996 novel Fight Club in style. Helen Young said that both the book and its sequel were stylistically similar, both being reminiscent of the novels American Psycho as well as Fight Club, in their expression of misogyny and violent masculinity, as well as its inclusion of "hallucinatory episodes".

Writer Andrew Marzoni noted it alongside Bronze Age Mindset as evidence that "the current trend of far-Right literature is pseudo-academic in its pretensions, but lacking in novel interventions". He said Harassment Architecture "blends the Nietzschean pastiche of Bronze Age Mindset with a flat, affected, first-person narration derivative of Houellebecq and alt-lit writers such as Tao Lin". He compared the disclaimer at the beginning of the book to 4chan posters saying their trolling was merely doing it for the "lulz". Graham Macklin writing for the academic journal Terrorism and Political Violence called it "saturated with irony and dark mordant humour", in a way that was reminiscent of online message boards.

One commentator called it a "memoir-cum-manifesto"; the style of the book is fragmented, combining a typical first-person style with ideological ranting and sections on "political and aesthetic discourse". Helen Young argued that the book and its sequel were both "profoundly gothic" in their contents, functioning as "narrative manifestos", viewing modern America as "inherently terrifying", and were an example of the far-right's exploitation of online media ecosystems. She said they were "blueprints and fantasies" for white supremacist thought, like many other works of far-right fiction, narrating a path utilizing violence for white supremacists to acquire political power.

== Reception and influence ==
The book became very popular among extremist online communities. One description said it "sits alongside Mason's Siege in the canon of prominent accelerationist writings". Like much far-right literature, the book and its sequel are widely available as free PDFs online. The book was widely regarded by readers, even those who agreed with its messaging, as a deeply uncomfortable read. Jenny Rice attributed the book's appeal in part to this, writing that "readers often explicitly link the uncomfortable experience of reading Harassment Architecture with the experience of self-transformation".

Since the book's publication it has been regularly spread by accelerationist and ecofascist Telegram channels; and it is popular in extremist communities online. The book was popular among Terrorgram, an interconnected series of Telegram channels that promotes extreme fascism. The book was mentioned by Solomon Henderson, the perpetrator of the 2025 Antioch High School shooting, in his manifesto. Despite initial media implications, Henderson was not a white nationalist but was instead African-American. The novella was found among the possessions of an individual who was arrested for terroristic threats in 2021.

The book's specific method of describing methods to conduct attacks, utilizing repetition of the qualifier "I hear some people...", is often duplicated by online accelerationist graphics; sections of the writings are often brought together with neo-Nazi activism in memes. Along with other far-right literature, it has been included in Nazi audio collections on Telegram. Following the book's publication, Ma became popular among online accelerationists; one commentator described it as a "staple of accelerationist and ecofascist reading lists".
