= Jonathan Keeperman =

American far-right activist

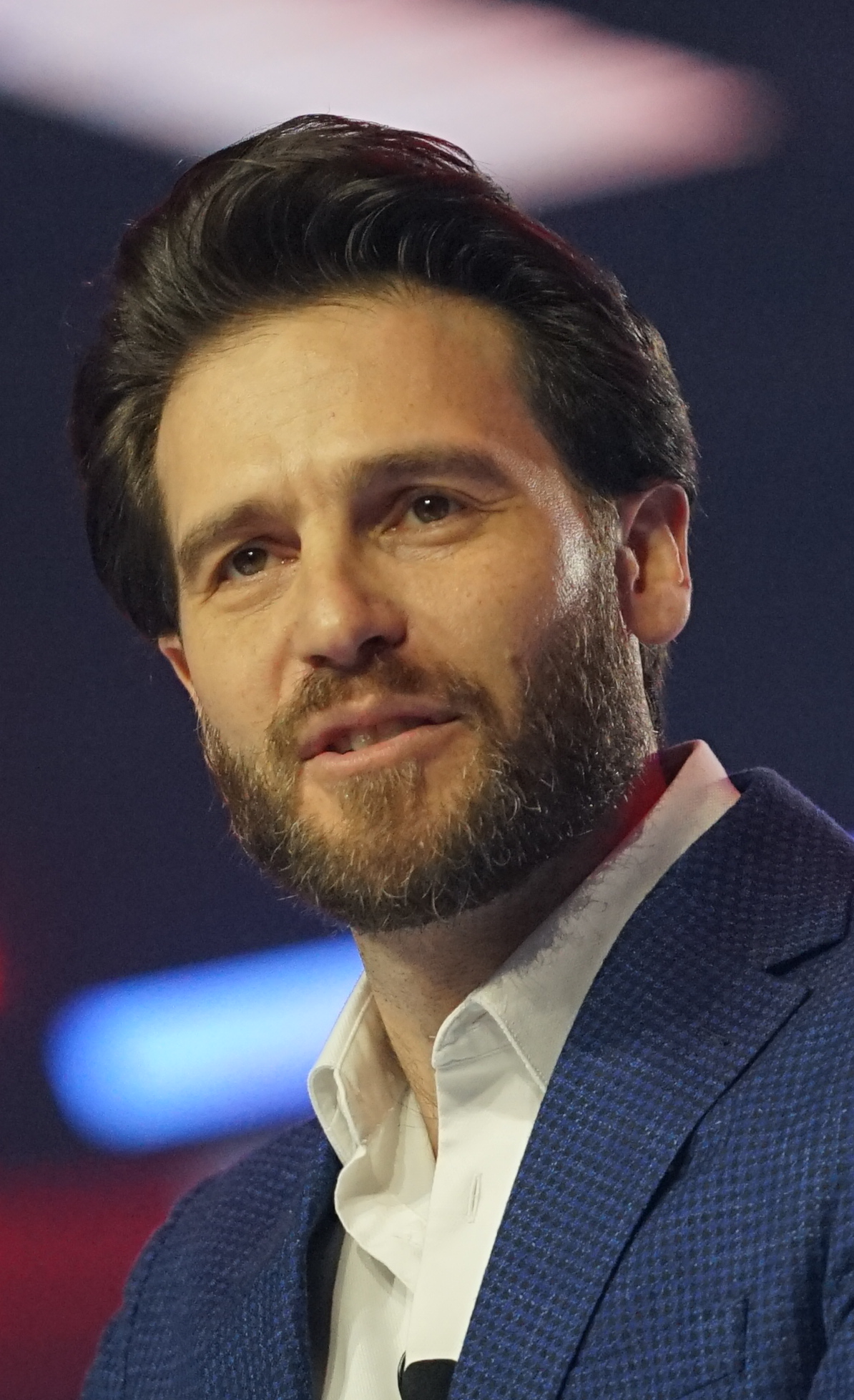
- Keeperman at AmericaFest 2025
- Other name: Lomez
- Citizenship: United States
- Education: University of California, San Diego (BA); University of California, Irvine (MFA)
- Organization: Passage Press

Jonathan Keeperman, also known by his pseudonym "Lomez" (stylised L0m3z), is an American far-right publisher who leads Passage Publishing, also known as Passage Press, a far-right and "new right" publishing company. Keeperman was a University of California, Irvine, lecturer from 2013 to 2022.

Founded in 2021, Passage publishes works from online personalities, reprints and new translations of fiction and nonfiction from historical fascist and reactionary authors.

== Biography ==
Keeperman was born to a Jewish family and was raised in Moraga, California. He celebrated his bar mitzvah in 1996. In college, he played for the University of California, San Diego, basketball team. Keeperman was a master of fine arts student at the University of California, Irvine (UCI), and was a lecturer in the university's English department from 2013 to 2022.

He began blogging under the pseudonym "Mr Lomez" in 2006. He used the Lomez identity from 2012 to 2014 in the comment section of Steve Sailer's blog posts, and then on Twitter accounts since around 2015. The account was criticized for using slurs to describe gay people and Asians and for proposing the lynching of journalists. In the 2020s, Lomez wrote in The American Mind, The Federalist, and an anti-feminist essay in First Things.

Keeperman was described by The Guardian as a "prominent member[...] of the so-called 'new right'. and Sohrab Ahmari for the New Statesman named him as an "influential, anonymous right-wing scribe and publisher". Ahmari also noted him as an example of the "Unabomber right", what he called a very online section of the far-right which he said had views parallel to Ted Kaczynski, that "shares both Kaczynski’s yearning for a return to nature and his rejection of any effort to ameliorate industrialism’s baleful effects through economic reform".

== Publishing ==
Passage Publishing, also known as Passage Press, is a far-right and "new right" independent publisher led by Keeperman that publishes works from online personalities, reprints and new translations of fiction and nonfiction from historical fascist and reactionary authors. The New York Times noted Passage as popular with conservative intellectuals. It was founded in 2021 out of the Passage Prize, an online writing and arts competition offering a $20,000 cryptocurrency prize for selected works. The judges were neoreactionary Curtis Yarvin and self-published author Zero HP Lovecraft. The name Passage Press comes from the book The Forest Passage by Ernst Jünger, who Keeperman stated was his favorite author.

In 2023, Passage Prize was rebranded as "Passage Publishing," and was expanded through acquisitions of Mystery Grove Publishing. Passage has published compendiums from online figures Steve Sailer, Nick Land and Curtis Yarvin. It also publishes fiction, including the Hardy Boys' original versions, and writings by Robert E. Howard and H. P. Lovecraft. Through its imprint Passage Classics, Passage Publishing also offers works by, as described by The Guardian, "radical German nationalist and militarist Ernst Jünger; Peter Kemp, who fought as a volunteer for Francisco Franco’s Nationalists during the Spanish Civil War; and two counter-revolutionary Russian aristocrats, White Russian general Pyotr Wrangel and Prince Serge Obolensky". Man's World is a bi-annual men's magazine published by Passage Publishing.

Passage Publishing also engages in cultural projects, including sponsoring events. Fashion designer Elena Velez, who is associated with the Dimes Square scene, has been sponsored by Passage and cited the company and its founder as inspiration.

Interviewed by Ross Douthat for the New York Times, Keeperman said the goal of Passage Publishing was to "revive what is a genuine right-wing cultural and ideological — I hate the word "movement," because it’s not quite that — but a right wing that can form an enduring and meaningful counterweight to a dominant left and a dominant progressive march". He contrasted this with previous works of consciously right-wing art, which he said were "moralistic", "didactic", "overly sentimental" and nostalgic instead of looking forward.

In 2025, The Guardian reported that trademark records indicated that Passage Publishing had become part of Foundation Publishing Group, and that business filings identified Keeperman as CEO of Foundation Publishing Group.

== See also ==
- Richard Hanania
- Jack Posobiec
- Milo Yiannopoulos
