= Militant accelerationism =

White supremacist ideology

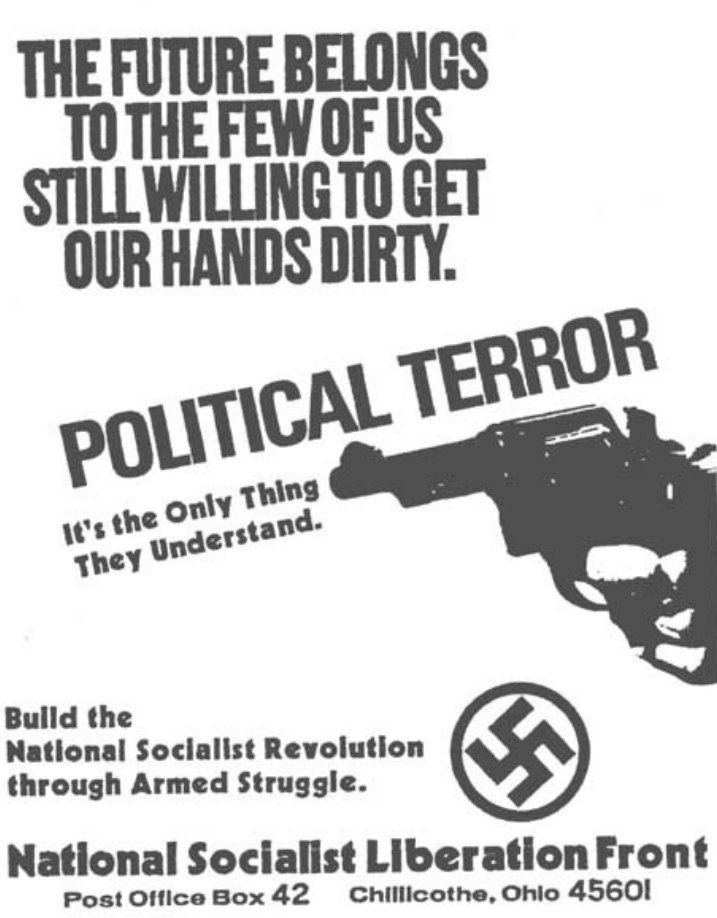
Joseph Tommasi's 1970s "Political Terror" flyer; Tommasi is credited as being one of the first neo-Nazi accelerationists

Militant accelerationism, also called neo-fascist accelerationism, far-right accelerationism, neo-Nazi accelerationism, or simply accelerationism, is a far-right and white supremacist ideology which aims to cause societal collapse and the creation of white ethnostates by intentionally exacerbating social conflict, especially through political violence. Militant accelerationists believe that modern society is irredeemable for reasons such as liberalism, democracy, and multiculturalism. As such, they promote and perform acts such as terrorism, murder, assassination, and infrastructure sabotage, with the belief that such actions will help destroy the current system and allow for the creation of a new one built on white nationalism.

While the term "accelerationism" was not used in this context until the 2010s, possibly sourced in part from accelerationist thinker Nick Land, the idea has origins in previous neo-Nazi activists. In the 1970s, Joseph Tommasi was a neo-Nazi accelerationist and advocated such ideas with his openly terroristic National Socialist Liberation Front. Following his murder, his associate James Mason promoted his ideology in his newsletter, and later book, Siege. The ideology was popularized among neo-Nazis in the 2010s, by the Iron March forum and the Atomwaffen Division, and has been linked to several mass murders.

== Definition and terminology ==
Militant accelerationism is a far-right and white supremacist ideology which aims to cause societal collapse and the creation of white ethnostates through exacerbating social conflict, especially through violence, terrorism, and other attacks. The term is used by both scholars and the advocates of the concept to refer to the ideology.

Accelerationism in this context differs from the primary usage of the term accelerationism, which is used to refer to a group of ideologies which sought to express certain aspects of capitalism to promote radical societal change, with variants differing on which aspects and if it would lead further into or away from capitalism. One accelerationist thinker, Nick Land, viewed capitalism as bringing about a technological singularity; he later engaged with the neoreactionary movement, rejecting egalitarianism and democracy to help achieve the singularity. Several analysts have connected the neo-Nazi adoption of the term accelerationism to Land's shift towards neoreactionarism, along with the neoreactionary movement crossing paths with the alt-right as another fringe right wing internet movement, as the likely route through which the far-right movement found the term for the otherwise unrelated ideas.

The Accelerationism Research Consortium, which has as its focus the study of militant accelerationism, defines accelerationism more broadly as "a recognition that modernity, liberalism, and capitalism’s inherent flaws are the source of their own inevitable and accelerating demise"; in contrast, militant accelerationism "embraces political violence and/or terrorism in pursuit of the destruction of the physical manifestations of these concepts". According to the Southern Poverty Law Center (SPLC), "on the case of white supremacists, the accelerationist set sees modern society as irredeemable and believe it should be pushed to collapse so a fascist society built on ethnonationalism can take its place. What defines white supremacist accelerationists is their belief that violence is the only way to pursue their political goals".

== Ideology and tactics ==
In the view of militant accelerationism's proponents, society is so hopelessly distorted that there is nothing left to save, making the only path forward total revolution. This represents a change from earlier kinds of fascism like in Nazi Germany or Fascist Italy, which believed the fascists could seize political power and transform the nation. Accelerationist fascists no longer believe this is possible, as they believe the world has degraded to such an extent that it is no longer capable of redemption. They advocate inducing racial conflict through violent means such as assassinations, murders, and terrorist attacks.

Scholar Helen Young said they "assume that social collapse is inevitable, typically because of perceived flaws of tolerance, secularity and multiculturalism in liberal democracies, and, in its violent militant forms, seeks to actively hasten that collapse". Accelerationists accept that that the destruction of society will also kill a large amount of white people; those who are to survive are perceived as superior. Scholar of the far-right Mattias Gardell described the militant accelerationist view in 2022: "To be born anew, the nation must first die. Total war will pave the way for national rebirth. The cleansing fire will not only consume the nation's foes but the vast majority of ordinary white folks, who have proven their worthlessness by allowing the situation to come this far."

Advocates of the ideology aim to increase social conflict and tension, typically through violence and aggression. Contributing to political polarization is also seen as a positive. Militant accelerationists have promoted mass murder and several mass murderers have committed their acts with an accelerationist ideology. Militant accelerationists have been known to promote attacks against the critical infrastructure that maintains society in order to expedite the social collapse. This is particularly targeted against the power grid or the Internet. Lone wolf terrorism has been advocated by neo-Nazi accelerationists. Benjamin Noys compared this form of accelerationism to the strategy of tension in 1970s Italy.

== History ==
=== Origins and early development of the idea ===
The occultist fascist writer Julius Evola's ideas have been seen as "proto-accelerationist". In his Revolt Against the Modern World, he advocated an "acceleration", writing that:

To some the path of acceleration may be the most suitable approach to a solution, considering that given certain conditions, many reactions are the equivalent of those cramps that only prolong agony and by delaying the end also delay the advent of the new principle. It would consist in assuming, together with a special inner orientation, the most destructive processes of the modern era in order to use them for liberation. This would be like turning a poison against oneself or like "riding a tiger."

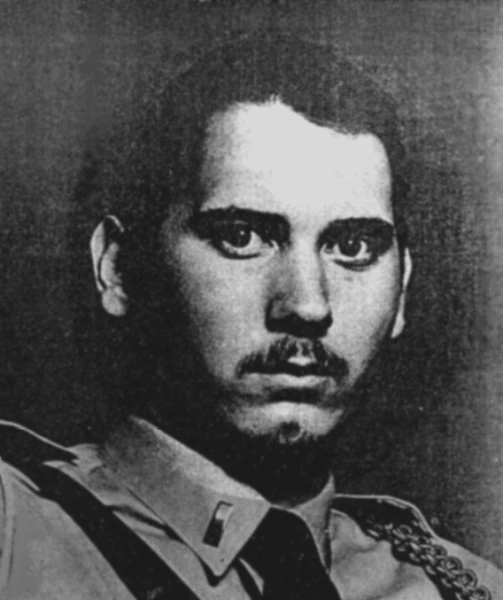
Joseph Tommasi, one of the first neo-Nazi accelerationists, pictured in 1974

One of the earliest neo-Nazi accelerationists was Joseph Tommasi, a 1970s American neo-Nazi activist. Tommasi, previously a member of the National Socialist White People's Party, went on to found the explicitly terroristic National Socialist Liberation Front (NSLF). With the founding of the NSLF, he advocated abandoning any strategy of winning the favor of the public, arguing this was impossible and that "[white people] are an occupied people in our own land who must now develop a totally different outlook on revolution." Instead, he advocated that neo-Nazis focus on "hurting the Enemy through force and violence" and utilize "destruction and disorder" as a tactic of "heightening the contradictions" in order to achieve their goals. One NSLF poster created by Tommasi read: "Political Terror: It's the only thing they understand."

Tommasi was shot dead a year after the NSLF was founded. His successor as leader of the NSLF was James Mason, another early advocate of accelerationist fascism. Mason authored the NSLF's neo-Nazi newsletter Siege, later edited into a book published in the 1990s, Siege, where he argued for sabotage, mass killings and assassinations of high-profile targets to destabilize and destroy the current society, seen as a system upholding a Jewish and multicultural New World Order. In Siege, he wrote that "terrorism is a two-way street for, as Hitler stated, the only answer to terrorism is stronger terrorism."

The white supremacist Tom Metzger, the founder of the White Aryan Resistance, was also an advocate of accelerationism. After several decades of being a member of and founding a variety of right-wing, white nationalist, and fascist groups, Metzger came to see organized white supremacy as doomed. A third positionist, Metzger argued the racial problems were in fact the result of global capitalism, claiming that the "racial problems are a side issue that comes from economic problems caused by the multinational corporations." He instead advocated lone wolf terrorist tactics; he said that white supremacists should be "advocating [white racist] violence; promoting violence; inspiring violence", and should abandon being members of organized groups, seizing on conflict caused by capitalism to benefit white nationalism. The end of the Cold War strengthened the position of accelerationist ideology among white supremacists, due to the lack of a major external enemy facing the west.

=== 2010s and 2020s ===
The term "accelerationism" in reference to this ideology first appeared in the late 2010s. In the 2010s, James Mason's works were republished and popularized by the Iron March forum and Atomwaffen Division, right-wing extremist organizations strongly connected to various terrorist attacks, murders and assaults. After largely disappearing from the neo-Nazi scene, James Mason returned to help advise the Atomwaffen Division.

Since the 2010s, the political ideology and religious worldview of the Order of Nine Angles, supposedly founded by the British neo-Nazi leader David Myatt in 1974, has increasingly influenced militant neo-fascist and neo-Nazi insurgent groups associated with right-wing extremist and white supremacist international networks, most notably the Iron March forum. The Order of Nine Angles encourages its members to commit violent acts and to infiltrate positions of power; for this reason, it has been seen by scholars as aligning with accelerationist ideology. Myatt wrote that his plan had been to "use such tactics to cause disruption, fear, and discontent, in order to provoke a revolutionary situation that our NS (National- Socialism), our racist, our fascist, or anti- immigrant groups in general, might be able to take advantage of politically and otherwise".

Brenton Tarrant, the perpetrator of the 15 March 2019 Christchurch mosque shootings that killed 51 people and injured 49 others, strongly encouraged accelerationism in a section of his manifesto titled Destabilization and Accelerationism: Tactics. Tarrant's manifesto influenced several other mass murderers and attempted mass murderers who similarly wrote manifestos containing accelerationist themes. He argued that fascists should not try to make life better for white people, but should instead attempt to make everything worse, as instability would lead to change; he wrote that they should instead be "supporting, attacking, vilifying, radicalizing and exaggerating all societal conflicts."

Accelerationist ideas also took hold on the neo-Nazi web forum Iron March in the 2010s. Following its demise, Terrorgram, a decentralized network of neo-Nazi accelerationist Telegram channels, became known for promoting militant accelerationism. Not all Terrorgram channels did so; some neo-Nazis saw accelerationism as ineffective or accused it of being a "psyop". The Terrorgram Collective (a specific group in Terrorgram) produced several instruction manuals promoting militant accelerationist ideas, including Militant Accelerationism: A Collective Handbook.

The 2019 novella Harassment Architecture, written by the far-right influencer Mike Ma, is very popular among online accelerationist communities, and espouses explicit accelerationist ideology and themes. Ma is also the founder of the Pine Tree Party militant accelerationist movement. Harassment Architecture encourages and gives instructions for committing infrastructure attacks.

In 2021, The New York Times held far-right accelerationism as detrimental to public safety. In the 2020s, the academic Accelerationism Research Consortium has been established to study the ideology.
