= Mike Ma =

American ecofascist writer (born 1995)

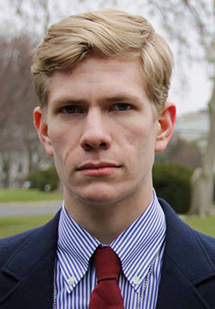
- Mahoney in 2016
- Born: Michael Mahoney; October 3, 1995 (age 31); North Carolina, U.S.
- Occupation: Writer
- Employer: Breitbart News (formerly)
- Notable work: Harassment Architecture, Gothic Violence
- Movement: Far-right; ecofascism; alt-right

Michael Mahoney (born October 3, 1995), better known by his pseudonym Mike Ma, is an American far-right and ecofascist writer. He wrote for the far-right American news and opinion website Breitbart News in the mid-2010s. He was an associate of British political commentator Milo Yiannopoulos, then an editor of Breitbart, accompanying Yiannopoulos on several of his speaking tours.

After Breitbart, Mahoney established the Pine Tree Party ecofascist movement in late 2017, becoming an influential figure in ecofascist spaces online. Mahoney has authored and self-published two novellas: Harassment Architecture in 2019, and Gothic Violence in 2021, which both convey an ecofascist and militant accelerationist ideology. Both are popular among the online far right. Mahoney is also a proponent of raw foodism.

== Early life ==
Michael Mahoney was born October 3, 1995 to a middle-class family. He is from North Carolina. According to his author biography in Harassment Architecture, he did not attend college, but was briefly a member of the United States Coast Guard before he was discharged for medical reasons due to recurrent sleepwalking.

== Activities ==
=== Breitbart News ===
Mahoney, known for his Twitter postings by this time, was hired by Glittering Steel, a production studio related to the far-right American news and opinion website Breitbart News, on September 11, 2016. Mahoney wrote for Breitbart News, and was an associate of British political commentator Milo Yiannopoulos, then the tech editor for Breitbart. He was part of "Team Milo", which was a group of staffers closer to Yiannopoulos than Breitbart as a whole; Mahoney accompanied Yiannopoulos on several of his speaking tours.

At a party celebrating Trump's election in 2017, he made the OK gesture, considered a white supremacist dog whistle in this context. Emails from Yiannopolous seen by BuzzFeed News revealed that Mahoney had to be "monitored" by Breitbart due to the extent of his antisemitism. Mahoney was later banned from Twitter, relocating to the alt-tech media service Gab for some time. He later quit writing for Breitbart.

Flag used by the Pine Tree Party

=== Pine Tree Party ===
Mahoney was also the apparent founder of the Pine Tree Party, an anti-government ecofascist movement with a widespread online presence, founded in 2017, which brought him prominence among ecofascists. ProPublica described their goal as "environmental, broad and violent". Mahoney claimed to establish the "Pine Tree Party" on November 3, 2017, through an Instagram post with a picture of its flag. Their flag was a derivation of the Pine Tree Flag and their motto was "An Appeal to Heaven". With the Pine Tree Party Ma encouraged acts of mass violence.

The group was loose in identification and related to a broader, loosely connected online subculture, also known as the pine tree gang. Adherents usually use pine tree emojis to identify themselves. The journalist Jake Hanrahan, writing for Wired UK, said the popularity of the Pine Tree Party was based in part on the recent release of the 2017 documentary about Ted Kaczynski, Manhunt: Unabomber; Mahoney disputed this. He spoke at Portland State University on behalf of the Pine Tree Party in 2019, maintaining a "consistent use of slurs throughout the speech"; two individuals threw soy milk at him and set off a noise machine.

In 2020, the journal Homeland Security Today described the Pine Tree Party as a violent extremist threat, and said it was "quickly accelerating, recruiting, and pushing the ideological bounds to promote infrastructure damage and violence now directly." They described the party as mixing white supremacy, environmentalism, and anti-government ideas.

=== Other ventures ===
In 2023, Mahoney was hired by Dryden Brown to fill an advisory role for his proposed city, Praxis.

== Views ==
Mahoney is an ecofascist ideologue, and an advocate of militant accelerationism. He previously described himself as "alt-right", and as a "nationalist cult leader". The Global Network on Extremism and Technology described him in 2022 as "an influencer within militant accelerationism and eco-fascist communities", while the Southern Poverty Law Center called him a major figure for some white power accelerationist communities. He has advocated for the expulsion of immigrants from the United States. With his novels and the Pine Tree Party, Mahoney has established an online following; Alex Amend, writing for The Public Eye, described him in 2020 as an ecofascist microcelebrity.

A 2022 analysis in the journal Terrorism and Political Violence described Mahoney as "outspoken in his hostility to the trappings of civilization, praise for vaguely articulated classical aesthetics, and notions of society governed by 'natural order.'" They said "his work exhibits the blurry contours of ecofascist tendencies in far-right movements" and that they "urge readers to hasten society’s accelerated collapse through acts of opportunistic violence". Mahoney said in 2019 that the modern world was "irreparable" and that "our grand solution is simply a hard reset". ProPublica quoted him as saying: "We will beat up anime kids. … We will bring the American family back to the woods, back to self-sufficiency. … We will oust illegal immigrants with zero mercy." He is anti-government; he said that his ideal form of governance was "no government, but obviously that would require a way smaller population." He has denied the Holocaust, said that men "should never prioritize women", and has praised the Unabomber, Ted Kaczynski.

Mahoney is also a proponent of raw foodism; he described himself as "a proponent of raw milk, raw eggs, raw organs". He is also against antibiotics, fluoridation of tap water, and consumption of seed oils. The Global Network on Extremism and Technology identified him as promoting a "more extreme paleo-style" relative to others in the raw food movement; they described this as a "far-right form of hypermasculinity". At a speech at Portland State University in 2019, Mahoney discussed government conspiracies and said those with dietary issues were "death walkers" and "victims of the United States government and its abuse".

== Novels ==
Mahoney has published two novellas under the pseudonym Mike Ma, which contain ecofascist and accelerationist themes. Scholar Helen Young noted Ma's novellas as two of the most popular fictional works to emerge from the far right. His novellas were advertised in Man's World, a magazine operated by Raw Egg Nationalist. Young described his writing as characterized by "violent masculinity, misogyny and hallucinatory episodes", "written in a fragmentary style that combines the core first-person narrative with sections of political and aesthetic discourse and ideological ranting". In their ideology, she wrote that they "narrativise a violent pathway to political control" for white supremacists.

=== Harassment Architecture (2019) ===
In 2019, Mahoney self-published a novella, Harassment Architecture. He described it as "more of a mental breakdown than a story". The book is popular among the online far right, including with neo-Nazis, and accelerationists. One analysis described its core message as "the concretized hatred for all that maintains society". Jenny Rice described it in the Quarterly Journal of Speech as "a fictional work of disconnected fragments that are filled with White nationalist imagery, brutal sexual violence, and gory fantasies of killing anyone who is not a straight White man".

=== Gothic Violence (2021) ===
In 2021, Ma published another novella, Gothic Violence; this book focuses on a group of terrorist surfers taking over Florida. The book is a follow-up to Harassment Architecture in terms of plot, though can be read independently. At the end of the novel there is a "nutrition addendum" where Mahoney gives diet advice.

== Bibliography ==
- Ma, Mike (2019). Harassment Architecture. ISBN 978-1-79564-149-4.
- Ma, Mike (2021). Gothic Violence. ISBN 979-8-5113-6776-7.
