= Iron March =

Neo-fascist and Neo-Nazi web forum

- Website type: Web forum
- Available in: English, with sub-forums in multiple languages
- Dissolved: November 2017
- Successor: Fascist Forge
- Creator: Alisher Mukhitdinov
- Website: ironmarch.org (archived)
- Commercial: No
- Launched: 2011
- Current status: Defunct

Iron March was a neo-fascist web forum open from 2011 to 2017. The site attracted neo-fascist and neo-Nazi members, including militants from organized far-right groups and members who would later go on to commit acts of terror. People linked to Iron March have been connected to 100 hate crimes. After the site closed, former users moved to alternative websites and social networking services, such as Discord. In 2019, an anonymous individual leaked the database that hosted all Iron March content.

== History ==
Russian nationalist Alisher Mukhitdinov (who goes by the moniker "Alexander Slavros") founded the online message board Iron March in 2011. Mukhitdinov is a Russian-Uzbek related to Nuritdin Mukhitdinov, a former communist leader of Uzbekistan.

Iron March became a platform for militant neo-fascist and neo-Nazi violent extremist organizations, including the Nordic Resistance Movement, National Action, Azov Battalion, CasaPound, and Golden Dawn. The forum's users organized a number of violent neo-Nazi groups, including the Atomwaffen Division, Antipodean Resistance, and National Action. Some of the board's members were later linked to several acts of terrorism and murder, such as the murder of an anti-fascist in Helsinki in September 2016. A group consisting of Serbian Combat 18, "MC Srbi", and Atomwaffen Division also used the forum to traffic firearms.

The userbase embraced the accelerationist ideology of James Mason, a neo-Nazi militant and associate of Charles Manson. Members of Iron March republished and popularized Mason's book Siege and its brand of explicitly neo-Nazi terrorism. According to the Southern Poverty Law Center:

[Iron March] became home base for those who were personally invested in Neo-Nazism, Fascism, and organized White extremism on a global scale. [...] through total immersion in Mason's teleology, now, they are challenging the established far-right and far-left with their eagerness to perpetrate violence.

The political ideology and religious worldview of the Order of Nine Angles (ONA), a theistic Satanist organization, came to have an influence on the forum. In 2016, posters urging students to visit the Iron March website were posted on university campuses, including those of Boston University, Old Dominion University, and the University of Chicago. These posters included racist and antisemitic slogans, including "#Hitler Disapproves", "No Degeneracy, No Tolerance, Hail Victory", and "Black Lives Don't Matter".

=== Closure and successors ===
The website closed in November 2017; the reasons for its closure remain unclear as of late 2019. According to an investigation conducted by BBC News Russian, it is suspected Mukhitdinov was pressured by the government of Russia for raising funds for the Ukrainian neo-Nazi Azov Battalion, which is considered a terrorist group in the Russian Federation. A spokesperson for the Azov Battalion refused to comment on the case.

After the site closed, former users migrated to alternative platforms. In February 2018, Iron March-affiliated Discord servers alongside several other hate group servers were removed by the messaging service. In April 2018, a networking site called Fascist Forge was launched; according to a note by its founder, it was meant as a replacement for Iron March. The site continued Iron March's virulent propaganda and grew rapidly until February 2019, when the site was taken offline by its registrar. The neo-Nazi network Terrorgram drew from Iron March and Fascist Forge in its ideology and style. Fash Front, a similar neo-fascist successor forum, was launched in 2025. Like its predecessor it promoted neo-Nazi accelerationism. It ceased functioning in October 2026.

=== Database leak ===
In November 2019, an unknown individual uploaded a database of Iron March users to the Internet Archive; multiple neo-Nazi users, including an ICE detention center captain and several active members of the U.S. Armed Forces, were identified using information from the leak.

A variety of individuals and organizations used information from the leak:

- Journalistic outlets and anti-fascist groups used the information to reveal the identities of users of the site.
- The open-source journalism outlet Bellingcat and online magazine Small Wars Journal performed data analysis on the entire corpus to understand the online radicalization processes of the far-right.
- Brett Stevens, editor of the far-right site "Amerika.org", used contact information from the leak to contact former Iron March users and direct them to his website.

== Notable users ==
In February 2015, three people were arrested for planning to commit a mass shooting at a shopping mall in Halifax, Nova Scotia, on February 14 that year. One of the suspects, 23-year-old Lindsay Souvannarath of Illinois, was found to have been an active member of the Iron March forum, and to have made many online posts in favor of neo-fascist or neo-Nazi ideologies.

Devon Arthurs, an Iron March user and member of the Atomwaffen Division (AWD), killed his two roommates, also members of AWD, in May 2017. Police found neo-Nazi literature, radioactive materials, a photograph of Oklahoma City bomber Timothy McVeigh, and explosives in his home. Arthurs' remaining roommate and fellow Iron March user Brandon Russell was arrested in Tampa, Florida, for stockpiling of illegal weapons and bomb-making materials. Russell had been among Iron March's most prolific users, having written around 1,500 posts on the site.

As a result of the Iron March leak in 2019, it was discovered the Latvian national-conservative politician and activist Raivis Zeltīts had posted on Iron March under the handle "Latvian_Integralist". Zeltīts acknowledged in a Facebook post that he had written using this handle, but Zeltīts said that he no longer held those views. Zeltīts remained in contact with Iron March administrator Benjamin Raymond as late as 2015.

Zack Davies, 26, of Mold, North Wales, attacked a Sikh man with a machete and claw hammer while shouting "White Power". Davies inflicted life-threatening injuries; in the judge's view, the victim would have died had Davies not been stopped by passers-by. In 2015, a British court found Davies guilty and assigned him a life sentence (with a minimum tariff of 14 years). Davies had an Iron March account and was a member of the British terrorist group National Action, which was proscribed in 2016.

== See also ==
- American Futurist, accelerationist website by former members of Atomwaffen/IM
