= Brett Stevens =

American neo-Nazi

Brett Stevens is a white supremacist and neo-Nazi blogger. He edits the blog Amerika.org, a far-right site that describes itself as a "more extreme" version of the neo-Nazi forum Iron March and which helped facilitate the LD50 conference. Stevens inspired and expressed admiration for Anders Breivik, the far-right terrorist who killed 77 people in Norway in 2011.

== Amerika.org ==
The logo as seen on the homepage of Amerika.org

Stevens edits the blog Amerika.org, a far-right site that has described itself as "ult-right". Some time after the neo-Nazi forum Iron March was shut down (its users had been linked to several murders and also to terrorist groups), an unknown source leaked user information from the site, including email addresses. Stevens used the leaked emails to contact former Iron March users in 2019, suggesting that, "If you liked the Iron March forum, you might find Amerika.org to be even more extreme.... We are Nietzschean, pro-Western, and anti-egalitarian. While our approach is more traditionalist than National Socialist, it is uncompromising."

The Daily Dot described Amerika.org as a site preoccupied with race, promoting the establishment of a caste system, the expulsion of US citizens to their ancestors' countries, the end of global immigration and trade, and support of what the site terms a "new hierarchy" that places a small number of people at the top of society. The Daily Dot described the website's writing as "long-winded and nonsensical".

Amerika.org is described as being among a number of alt-right sites that "fuse deep ecology with explicit white supremacy", taking concerns about species extinction and habitat loss and relating them to the white genocide conspiracy theory and a purported replacement of indigenous white people with invasive foreigners.

== LD50 ==
Stevens presented a talk titled "The Black Pill" at the 2016 LD50 arts conference in London and helped promote and gatekeep the event on Amerika.org. The title of Stevens' talk references the term used in manosphere and anti-feminist circles inspired from the term in The Matrix. In these contexts, "the red pill" means accepting truth of these ideologies, beyond which Stevens drew a further boundary with "The Black Pill", describing this further pill as rejection of every possibility of "illusion" and "positive action" in a manner amounting to total nihilism. Stevens presented alongside Iben Thranholm, VDARE founder Peter Brimelow, Mark Citadel, and neo-reactionary Nick Land.

== Influence ==
Anders Breivik, the far-right terrorist who murdered 77 in attacks in Norway in 2011, described Stevens' writings as inspirational. Following the attacks, Stevens wrote about Brevik, "I am honored to be so mentioned by someone who is clearly far braver than I, no comment on his methods, but he chose to act where many of us write, think and dream."
