= Ecofascism =

Authoritarian environmentalist ideology

Ecofascism, sometimes spelled eco-fascism, is a term used to describe individuals and groups which combine environmentalism with fascism. In older literature, eco-fascism was viewed as a hypothetical form of totalitarianism based on environmentalism. Since the 2010s, a number of individuals and groups have emerged that either self-identify as "ecofascist" or have been labelled as "ecofascist" by academic and journalistic sources. These individuals and groups synthesise radical far-right politics with environmentalism; they will typically argue that overpopulation is the primary threat to the environment and that the only solution is a complete halt to immigration or, at their most extreme, genocide against various groups and ethnicities. Many far-right political parties have added green politics to their platforms. Through the 2010s, ecofascism has also seen increasing support, and subsequently has seen increasing interest from researchers.

== Definition ==
Philosopher André Gorz characterised eco-fascism as hypothetical forms of totalitarianism based on an ecological orientation of politics. Similar definitions have been used by others in older academic literature in discussions of "environmental fascism".

In 2005, environmental historian Michael E. Zimmerman defined "ecofascism" as "a totalitarian government that requires individuals to sacrifice their interests to the well-being of the 'land', understood as the splendid web of life, or the organic whole of nature, including peoples and their states". This was supported by philosopher Patrick Hassan's work analysing historical accusations of ecofascism in academic literature. Zimmerman argued that while no ecofascist government has existed so far, "important aspects of it can be found in German National Socialism, one of whose central slogans was "Blood and Soil". Other political agendas, instead of environmental protection and prevention of climate change, are nationalist approaches to climate such as national economic environmentalism, securitisation of climate change, and ecobordering.

Ecofascists often believe there is a symbiotic relationship between a nation-group and its homeland. They often blame the Global South for ecological problems, with their proposed solutions often entailing extreme population control measures based on racial categorisations, and advocating for the accelerated collapse of current society to be replaced by fascist societies. This latter belief is often accompanied with vocal support for terrorist actions.

Vice has defined ecofascism as an ideology "which blames the demise of the environment on overpopulation, immigration, and over-industrialization, problems that followers think could be partly remedied through the mass murder of refugees in Western countries." Environmentalist author Naomi Klein has suggested that ecofascists' primary objectives are to close borders to immigrants and, on the more extreme end, to embrace the idea of climate change as a divinely-ordained signal to begin a mass purge of sections of the human race. Ecofascism is "environmentalism through genocide", opined Klein. Political researcher Alex Amend defined ecofascist belief as "The devaluing of human life—particularly of populations seen as inferior—in order to protect the environment viewed as essential to White identity."

Terrorism researcher Kristy Campion defined ecofascism as "a reactionary and revolutionary ideology that champions the regeneration of an imagined community through a return to a romanticised, ethnopluralist vision of the natural order." She further argues that ecofascists can be broadly divided into two groups: "custodians" who are predominantly ecocentric, and consider themselves and their localised ethnic group responsible for maintaining the ecological balance of their native lands, and "conquerors", who are anthropocentric, and are motivated to preserve the environment due to the belief that their "race" will not survive ecological collapse.

The European Commission describes ecofascism as the "weaponization of climate change by far right populist political parties and white supremacist groups". Tactics of this weaponisation include the use of language and equating actors in population and migration discourses to components of the climate crisis. As said in a policy brief for the International Center for Counter-Terrorism, this "linguistic violence" entails that "the invasion of non-native species that threaten the environment becomes synonymous with the invasion of immigrants, the protection of the environment with the protection of borders, trash with people, and environmental cleansing with ethnic cleaning."

Helen Cawood and Xany Jansen Van Vuuren have criticised previous attempts to define ecofascism as focusing too heavily on environmental and ecological conservationism in historical fascist movements, and the subsequent definitions being too broad and encompassing many ontologically different ideologies. In their criticism they summarise the current definition of ecofascism as used in the academic literature as "a movement that uses environmental and ecological conservationist talking points to push an ideology of ethnic or racial separatism". This is supported by Blair Taylor statement that ecofascism refers to "groups and ideologies that offer authoritarian, hierarchical, and racist analyses and solutions to environmental problems". Similarly, extremism researchers Brian Hughes, Dave Jones, and Amarnath Amarasingam argue that ecofascism is less a coherent ideology and more a cultural expression of mystical, anti-humanist romanticism. This is further supported by Maria Darwish in her research into the Nordic Resistance Movement where while there is concern for environmental issues they are "a concern for Neo-Nazis only in so far as it supports and popularizes the backstage mission of the NRM", that is the implementation of a fascist regime, and Jacob Blumenfeld stating "ecofascism names a specific far-right ideology that rationalizes white supremacist violence by invoking imminent ecological collapse and scarce natural resources".

Borrowing from the "watermelon" analogy of eco-socialism, Berggruen Institute scholar Nils Gilman has coined the term "avocado politics" for eco-fascism, being "green on the outside but brown(shirt) at the core".

In his book "Ecofascismo", the political scientist Carlos Taibo characterises the phenomenon as a response to crises brought about by climate change. The ecofascist solution is to "[P]reserve increasingly scarce resources for a select minority. And to marginalize – in the mildest version – and exterminate – in the harshest – what are seen as surplus populations, on a planet that has visibly exceeded its limits." Crucially, Taibo argues that far from being circumscribed to the margins of right-wing extremism, which traditionally has mostly been associated with Climate change denial, ecofascist notions are likely to be pursued by "political forces we usually label as liberal and social-democratic", emerging within major centers of power in the west and among elites in the developing world. From this perspective, the antecedents of ecofascism, extending beyond ecological currents in fascist movements of the past, would be ideologies typical of Western colonialism, returning in modernised forms.

== Ideological origins ==
=== Madison Grant ===
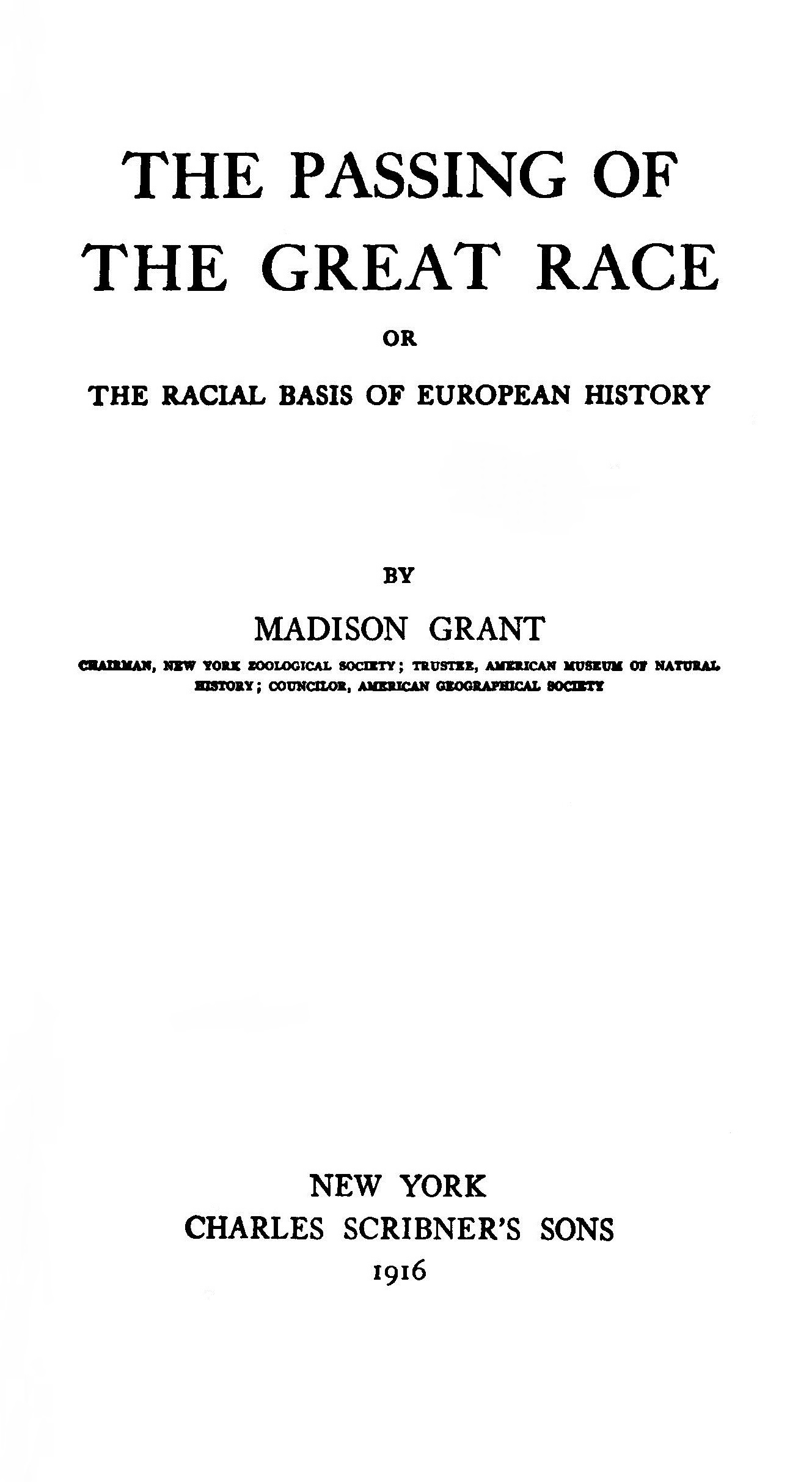
Title page of Grant's book The Passing of the Great Race (1916)

Sometimes dubbed the "founding father" of ecofascism, Madison Grant was a pioneer of conservationism in America in the late 19th and early 20th century. Grant is credited as a founder of modern wildlife management. Grant built the Bronx River Parkway, was a co-founder of the American Bison Society, and helped create Glacier National Park, Olympic National Park, Everglades National Park and Denali National Park. As president of the New York Zoological Society, he founded the Bronx Zoo in 1899.

In addition to his conservationist work, Grant was a trenchant racist and eugenicist. In 1906, Grant supported the placement of Ota Benga, a kidnapped member of the Mbuti people, removed from his home in the Congo, and put on display in the Bronx Zoo as an exhibit in the Monkey House. In 1916, Grant wrote The Passing of the Great Race, a work of pseudoscientific literature which claimed to give an account of the anthropological history of Europe. The book divides Europeans into three races: Alpines, Mediterraneans and Nordics. It also claims that the first two races are inferior to the superior Nordic race, which it claims is the only race fit to rule the earth. Adolf Hitler would later describe Grant's book as "his bible" and Grant's "Nordic theory" became the bedrock of Nazi racial theories. Additionally, Grant was a eugenicist: he cofounded and was the director of the American Eugenics Society and also advocated the culling of the unfit from the human population. Grant concocted a 100-year plan to perfect the human race, a plan in which one ethnic group after another would be killed off until racial purity would be obtained. Grant campaigned for the passage of the Emergency Quota Act of 1921 and he also campaigned for the passage of the Immigration Act of 1924, which drastically reduced the number of immigrants from eastern Europe and Asia who were allowed to enter the United States.

In the 21st century, Grant's ideas have been cited by far-right figures such as Richard Spencer and the Norwegian mass shooter Anders Breivik.

=== Nazism ===
The authors Janet Biehl and Peter Staudenmaier suggest that the synthesis of fascism and environmentalism began with Nazism, stating that 19th and 20th century Germany was an early center of ecofascist thought, finding its antecedents in many prominent natural scientists and environmentalists, including Ernst Moritz Arndt, Wilhelm Heinrich Riehl, and Ernst Haeckel. With the works and ideas of such individuals being later established as policies in the Nazi regime. This is supported by other researchers who identify the Völkisch movement as an ideological originator of later ecofascism. In Biehl and Staudenmaier's book Ecofascism: Lessons from the German Experience, they note the Nazi Party's interest in ecology, and suggest their interest was "linked with traditional agrarian romanticism and hostility to urban civilization". With Sam Moore and Alex Roberts pointing to the works of conservationist and Nazi Walther Schoenichen as intertwining such romantic views of nature, the need to protect the natural environment, and the supposed necessity of struggle between racial groups, with Zimmerman highlighting how Schoenichen's works have had pertinence to later ecofascism and similarities to developments in deep ecological understanding.

During the Nazi rise to power, there was strong support for the Nazis among German environmentalists and conservationists. Richard Walther Darré, a leading Nazi ideologist and Reich Minister of Food and Agriculture who invented the term "Blood and Soil", developed a concept of the nation having a mystic connection with their homeland, and as such, the nation was dutybound to take care of the land. This slogan is viewed not only as a key part of far-right extremism but as a clear ideological expression of ecofascist thought. This mystic connection was supported by other Nazi theorists such as Alfred Rosenberg who wrote of how society's move from agricultural systems to industrialised systems broke their connection to nature and contributed to the death of the Volk. Similar sentiments are found in speeches from Fascist Italy's Minister of Agriculture Giuseppe Tassinari. Because of this, modern ecofascists cite the Nazi Party as an origin point of ecofascism. Beyond Darré, Rudolf Hess and Fritz Todt are viewed as representatives of environmentalism within the Nazi party. Roger Griffin has also pointed to the glorification of wildlife in Nazi art and ruralism in the novels of the fascist sympathisers Knut Hamsun and Henry Williamson as examples. Other projects under the Nazis sought to recreate "the mythical German landscape of ancient times, when the Aryan race was pure and unthreatened." This was pursued through the attempt to de-extinct the aurochs and the tarpan, building on the prior work of the brothers Heinz and Lutz Heck in developing the Heck cattle and Heck horse.

After the outlawing of the neo-nazi Socialist Reich Party, one of its members August Haußleiter moved towards organising within the environmental and anti-nuclear movements, going on to become a founding member of the German Green Party. When green activists later uncovered his past activities in the neo-Nazi movement, Haußleiter was forced to step down as the party's chairman, although he continued to hold a central role in the party newspaper. As efforts to expel nationalist elements within the party continued, a conservative faction split off and founded the Ecological Democratic Party, which became noted for persistent holocaust denial, rejection of social justice and opposition to immigration.

==== Savitri Devi ====
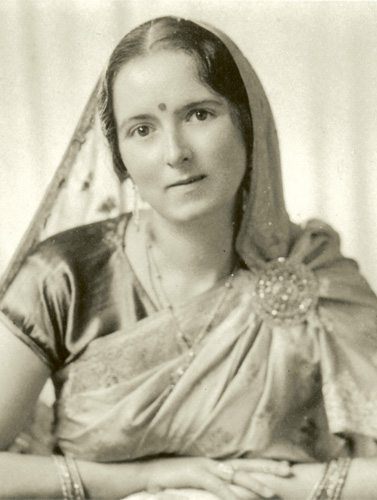
Savitri Devi's avowed Nazism, combined with her advocacy of animal rights and vegetarianism, has made her a figure of interest to ecofascists.

The French-born Greek fascist Savitri Devi (born Maximiani Julia Portas) was a prominent proponent of Esoteric Nazism and deep ecology. A fanatical supporter of Hitler and the Nazi Party from the 1930s onwards, she also supported animal rights activism and was a vegetarian from a young age. In her works, she espoused ecologist views, such as the Impeachment of Man (1959), in which she espoused her views on animal rights and nature. In accordance with her ecologist views, human beings do not stand above the animals; instead, humans are a part of the ecosystem and as a result, they should respect all forms of life, including animals and the whole of nature. Because of her dual devotion to Nazism and deep ecology, she is considered an influential figure in ecofascist circles.

=== Malthusianism ===
Malthusian ideas of overpopulation have been adopted by ecofascists, using Malthusian rationale in anti-immigration arguments and seeking to resolve the perceived global issue by enforcing population control measures on the global south and racial minorities in white majority countries. Such Malthusian ideas are often paired with Social Darwinism, eugenics, and "lifeboat ethics".

=== Ted Kaczynski, the Unabomber ===
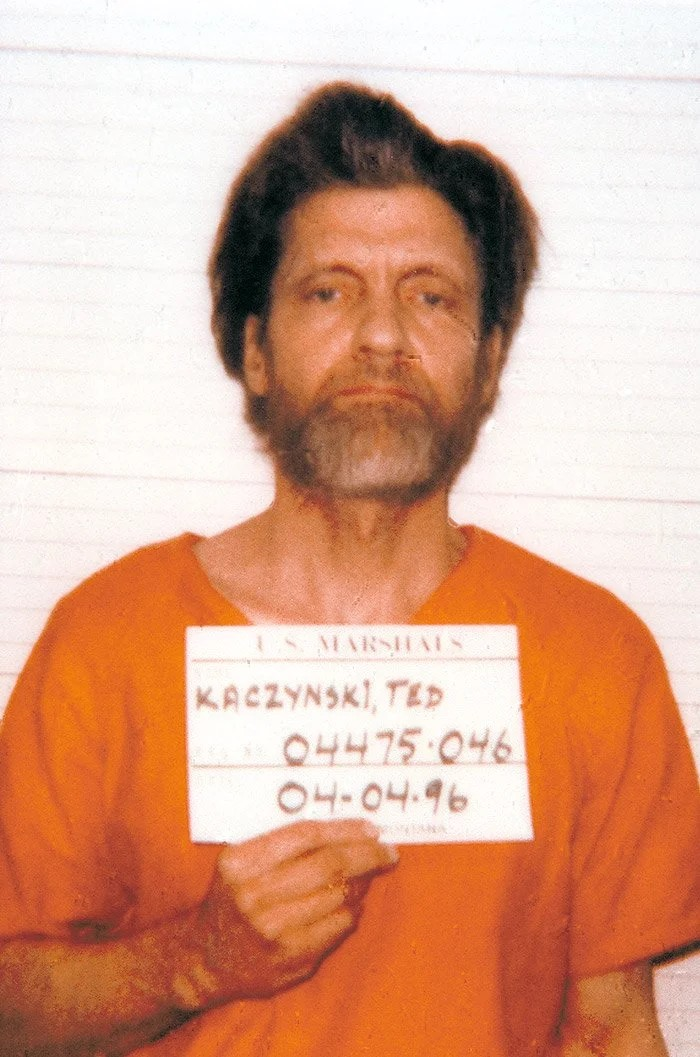
Ted Kaczynski AKA "The Unabomber" in a mug shot taken shortly after his arrest in April 1996

Ted Kaczynski, better known as "The Unabomber", is cited as a figure who was highly influential in the development of ecofascist thought, and features prominently in contemporary ecofascist propaganda. Between 1978 and 1995, Kaczynski instigated a terrorist bombing campaign aimed at inciting a revolution against modern industrial society, in the name of returning humanity to a primitive state he suggested offered humanity more freedom while protecting the environment. In 1995 Kaczynski offered to end his bombing campaign if The Washington Post or The New York Times would publish his 35,000-word Unabomber Manifesto. Both newspapers agreed to those terms. The manifesto railed not only against modern industrial society but also against "modern leftists", whom Kaczynski defined as "mainly socialists, collectivists, 'politically correct' types, feminists, gay and disability activists, animal rights activists and the like".

Because of Kaczynski's intelligence and because of his ability to write in a high-level academic tone, his manifesto was given serious consideration upon its release and it became highly influential, even amongst those who severely disagreed with his use of violence. Kaczynski's staunchly radical pro-green, anti-left work was quickly absorbed into ecofascist thought.

Kaczynski also criticised right-wing activists who complained about the erosion of traditional social mores because they supported technological and economic progress, a view which he opposed. He stated that technology erodes traditional social mores that conservatives and right wingers want to protect, and he referred to conservatives as fools.

Although Kaczynski and his manifesto have been embraced by ecofascists, he rejected "fascism", including specifically "the 'ecofascists'", describing ecofascism itself as "an aberrant branch of leftism":

The true anti-tech movement rejects every form of racism or ethnocentrism. This has nothing to do with "tolerance," "diversity," "pluralism," "multiculturalism," "equality," or "social justice." The rejection of racism and ethnocentrism is - purely and simply - a cardinal point of strategy.

In his manifesto, Kaczynski wrote that he considered fascism a "kook ideology" and he also wrote that he considered Nazism "evil". Kaczynski never tried to align himself with the far-right at any point before or after his arrest.

In 2017, Netflix released a dramatisation of Kaczynski's life, titled Manhunt: Unabomber. Once again, the popularity of the show thrust Kaczynski and his manifesto into the public's mind and it also raised the profile of ecofascism.

=== Garrett Hardin, Pentti Linkola, and "Lifeboat Ethics" ===
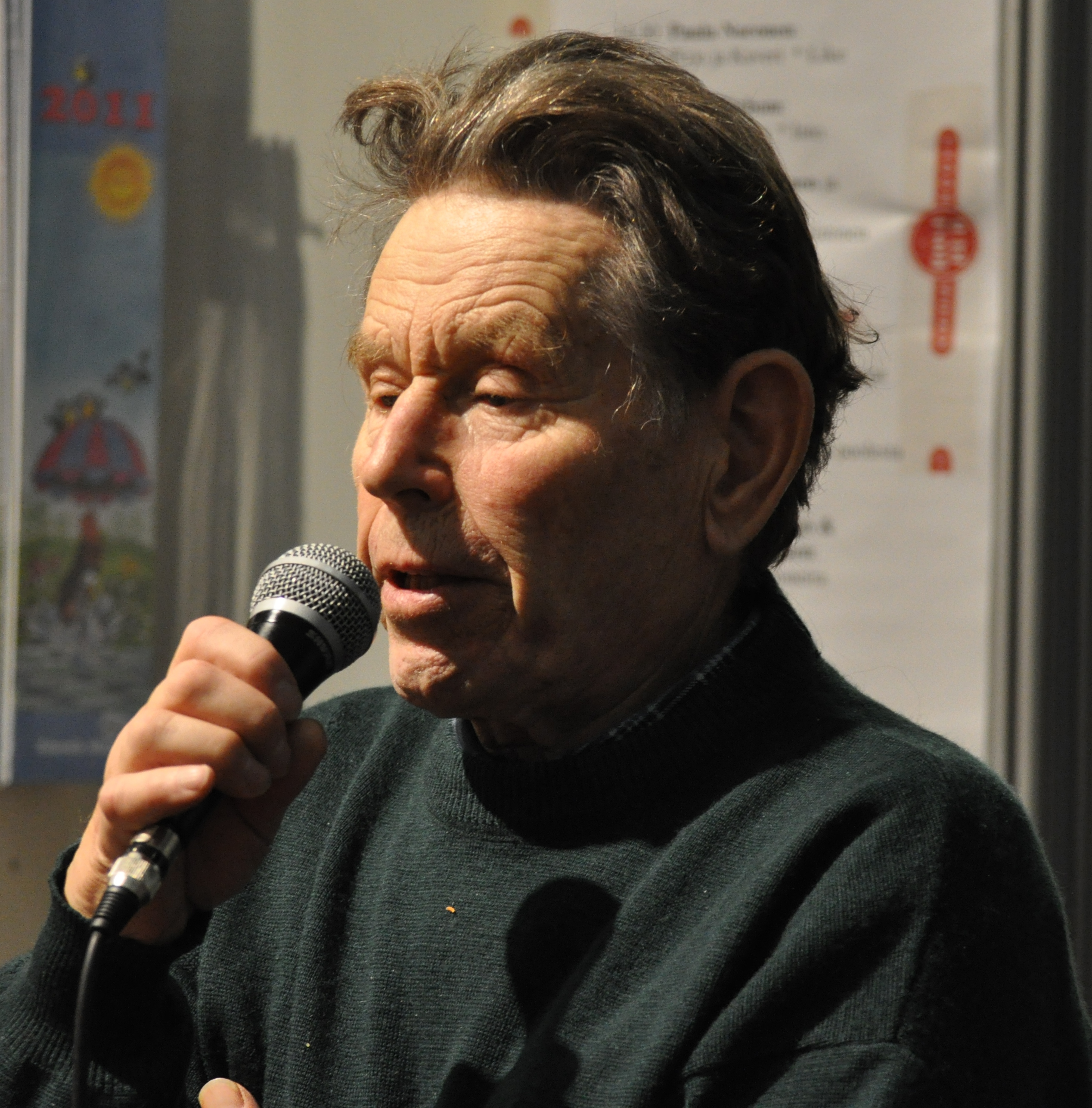
Pentti Linkola's advocacy of "Lifeboat Ethics" is cited by commentators as an example of ecofascism.

Two figures influential in ecofascism are Garrett Hardin and Pentti Linkola, both of whom were proponents of what they refer to as "lifeboat ethics". Hardin was a professor of Human Ecology at the University of California often described as a white nationalist. His work was focused on the ethics of overpopulation and population control and suggested different methods like "birth control, abortion, and sterilization". Not only did he have medical suggestions but also stood against immigration and foreign aid. The work of Linkola and Hardin has been influential on ecofascist thought.

Linkola was a Finnish ecologist and radical Malthusian accused of being an active ecofascist who actively advocated ending democracy and replacing it with dictatorships that would use totalitarian and even genocidal tactics to end climate change. Both men used versions of the following analogy to illustrate their viewpoint:

What to do, when a ship carrying a hundred passengers suddenly capsizes and there is only one lifeboat? When the lifeboat is full, those who hate life will try to load it with more people and sink the lot. Those who love and respect life will take the ship's axe and sever the extra hands that cling to the sides.

=== Renaud Camus ===
Renaud Camus' conspiracy theory, the Great Replacement, has been influential on ecofascism, being referenced explicitly in multiple manifestos and had its ideas relayed in others. In the conspiracy theory, the "native" white populations of western countries are being replaced by non-white populations as a directed political effort.

== Association with violence ==
Ecofascist violence has occurred since the 21st century, with academics and researchers warning that as ecological crises worsen and remain unaddressed, support for ecofascism and violence in the name of ecofascism will increase.

In December 2020, the Swedish Defence Research Agency released a report on ecofascism. The paper argued that ecofascism is intimately tied to the ideology of accelerationism, and ecofascists nearly exclusively choose terror tactics over the political approach. Further, the SDRA argues not all ecofascist mass shooters have been recognised as such: Pekka-Eric Auvinen who shot eight people in Finland in 2007 before killing himself adhered to the ideology according to his manifesto titled "The Natural Selector's Manifesto". He advocated "total war against humanity" due to the threat humanity posed to other species. He wrote that death and killing is not a tragedy, as it constantly happens in nature between all species. Auvinen also wrote that the modern society hinders "natural justice" and that all inferior "subhumans" should be killed and only the elite of humanity be spared. In one of his YouTube videos Auvinen paid tribute to the prominent deep ecologist Pentti Linkola. Auvinen also mentioned the racist bomber Franz Fuchs in his manifesto as an inspiration.

=== 2010s ===
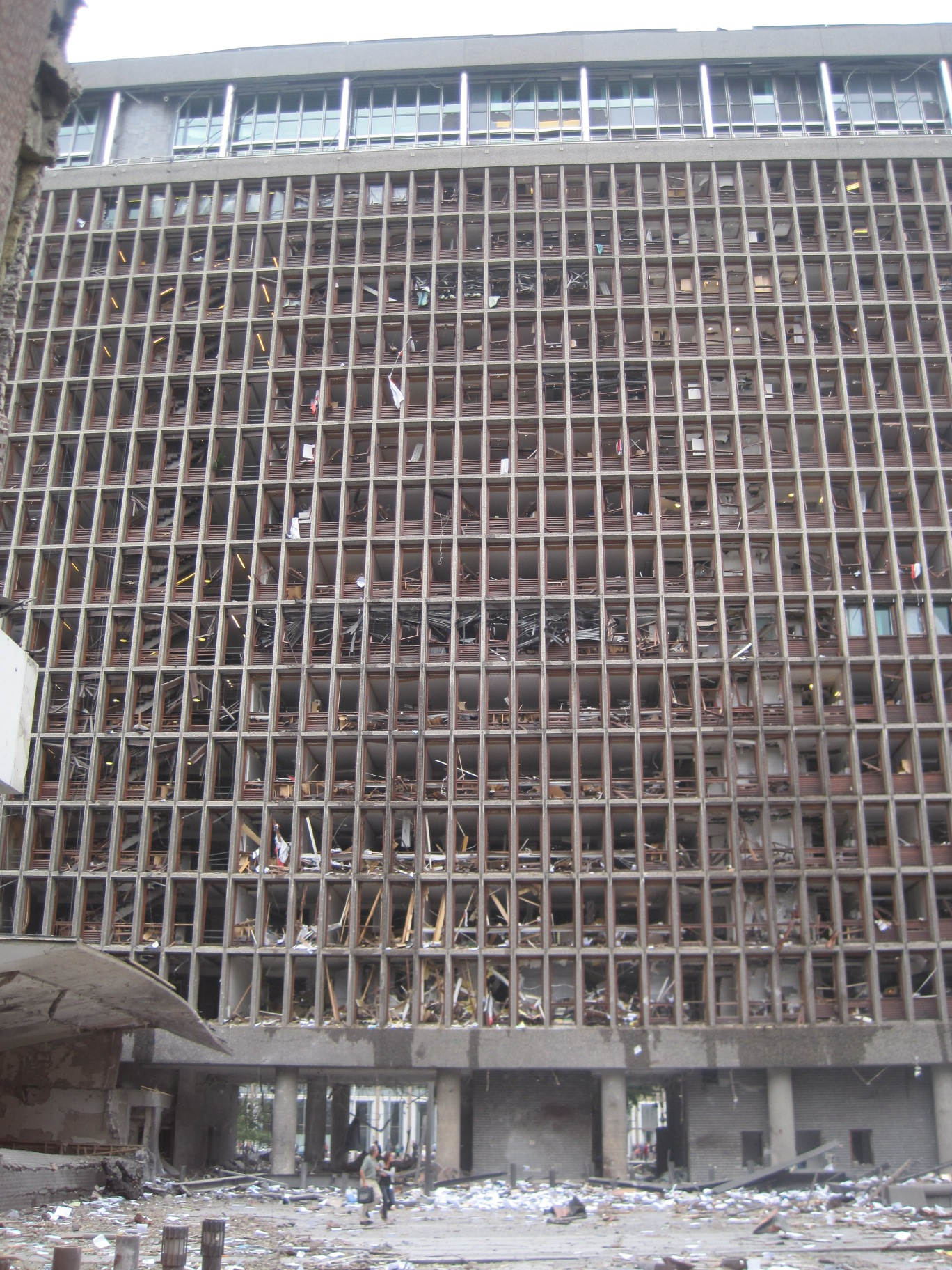
The building housing the Norwegian Office of the Prime Minister and Ministry of Justice and the Police with blown-out windows shortly after the bombing that occurred as part of the 2011 Norway attacks. The bomb van had been placed behind the people shown.

James Jay Lee, the eco-terrorist who took several hostages at the Discovery Communications headquarters on 1 September 2010, was described as an ecofascist by Mark Potok of the Southern Poverty Law Center.

Anders Breivik committed the 2011 Norway attacks on 22 July 2011, in which he killed eight people by detonating a van bomb at Regjeringskvartalet in Oslo, and then killed 69 participants of a Workers' Youth League (AUF) summer camp, in a mass shooting on the island of Utøya. While dismissive of climate change, Breivik's manifesto was concerned with the carrying capacity of the planet, taking inspiration from Kaczynski and Grant's The Passing of the Great Race. Breivik’s solution to this perceived problem was to cap the global population at 2.5 billion people, with the reduction in the global population being forced upon the global south. Through his actions he sought to inspire other terrorist attacks, and was an inspiration for later ecofascist terrorists.

William H. Stoetzer, a member of the Atomwaffen Division, an organisation responsible for at least eight murders, was active in the Earth Liberation Front as late as 2008 and joined Atomwaffen in 2016.

The perpetrator of the Pittsburgh synagogue shooting, Robert Gregory Bowers, targeted the synagogue in part due to their hosting of a National Refugee Shabbat in support of HIAS. Bowers shared similar views to later ecofascist shooters regarding "overpopulation and environmental degradation". Bowers expressed views on social media that supported the Great Replacement conspiracy theory, believing that organisations like HIAS were actively participating in the conspiracy theory.

Brenton Tarrant, the Australian-born perpetrator of the Christchurch mosque shootings in New Zealand described himself as an ecofascist, ethno-nationalist, and racist in his manifesto The Great Replacement, named after a far-right conspiracy theory originating in France. In the manifesto Tarrant specifically mentions Breivik as an ideological and operational influence. Researchers point to Tarrant's terrorist attack as the moment when discussion of ecofascism moved from academic and specialist circles into the mainstream. Jordan Weissmann, writing for Slate, describes the perpetrator's version of ecofascism as "an established, if somewhat obscure, brand of neo-Nazi" and quotes Sarah Manavis of New Statesman as saying, "[Eco-fascists] believe that living in the original regions a race is meant to have originated in and shunning multiculturalism is the only way to save the planet they prioritise above all else". Similarly, Luke Darby clarifies it as: "eco-fascism is not the fringe hippie movement usually associated with ecoterrorism. It's a belief that the only way to deal with climate change is through eugenics and the brutal suppression of migrants."

Patrick Crusius, the perpetrator of the 2019 El Paso shooting, wrote a similar manifesto, professing support for Tarrant. Posted to the online message board 8chan, it blames immigration to the United States for environmental destruction, saying that American lifestyles were "destroying the environment", invoking an ecological burden to be borne by future generations, and concluding that the solution was to "decrease the number of people in America using resources". Crusius outlined how he took inspiration from Tarrant and Breivik in his manifesto. Crusius and Tarrant also inspired Philip Manshaus who attacked a mosque in Norway in 2019. The El Paso shooting showed the increasing revival of ecofascism in popular discourse, and increased the public awareness of the "greening of hate".

=== 2020s ===
Eco-fascists have been noted as using the Algiz rune and pine tree emojis to identity each other online on social media platforms.

The Swedish self-identified ecofascist Green Brigade is an eco-terrorist group linked to The Base that is responsible for multiple mass murder plots. The Green Brigade has been responsible for arson attacks against targets deemed to be enemies of nature, like an attack on a mink farm that caused multi-million-dollar damages. Two members were arrested by Swedish police, allegedly planning assassinating judges and bombings. After the arrests and the disappearance of other leading members from its online groups, activity in the group decreased, with minimal evidence that it still operates.

In June 2021, the Telegram-based Terrorgram collective published an online guide with incitements for attacks on infrastructure and violence against minorities, police, public figures, journalists, and other perceived enemies. In December 2021, they published a second document containing ideological sections on accelerationism, white supremacy, and ecofascism.

During 2021, several neo-Nazi groups and individuals who espoused ecofascist rhetoric were arrested and charged by French authorities for planning terrorist attacks. These include the group Recolonisons la France, and two "accelerationists" in Occitania.

Bellingcat described the perpetrator of the 2021 Denver and Lakewood shootings Lyndon McLeod who fatally shot five people as Ecofascist. McLeod praised accelerationist groups in online statements.

In an interview with a blog Maldición Eco-Extremista a leader of the eco-extremist group Individualists Tending to the Wild (ITS) claimed to have taken organisational influence from the fascist accelerationist terrorist group Order of Nine Angles. The Foundation for Defense of Democracies and European Union Counter-Terrorism Coordinator characterised ITS as ecofascist.

Payton Gendron, the perpetrator of the 2022 Buffalo shooting, wrote a manifesto self-describing as "an ethno-nationalist eco-fascist national socialist" within it and also professing support for various far-right terrorists, including Tarrant, and Dylann Roof to Breivik and Robert Bowers. Gendron wrote of immigrants to the United States supposedly lacking care for its environment. Later in 2022, the Terrorgram collective released another publication, with analysts believing it would likely inspire further "Buffalo shootings".

In Finland on 15 March 2024, the anniversary of Christchurch mosque shooting, Finnish army Alikersantti Evita Kolmonen was arrested for allegedly planning a mass shooting in a university in Vaasa that day. As her motivation she said the world needed "a mass culling" to put an end to "selfish individualism", "human degeneration", global warming and conspicuous consumption. The Finnish police described her as ecofascist and that she had read books by Friedrich Nietzsche, Linkola, and Kaczynski. Additionally she had praised Pekka-Eric Auvinen in internet conversations and had visited Jokela school where he perpetrated the mass shooting. During the court proceedings, a bomb threat was called against the Vaasa Court of Appeal hearing her case. Kolmonen was convicted on 15 January 2025 of a firearm offense and planning an aggravated crime against life and health, and sentenced to three years and two months in prison.

On 24 April 2025, a mass stabbing occurred at Our Lady of All Helps High School in Nantes, France, a teenage student was killed and three others were wounded. A 15-year-old male suspect was arrested at the scene and wrote a manifesto titled Immune Action. The document was sent to students via email and advocated environmentalism, anti-industrialism and anti-globalism and contained strong antisemitism. The suspect followed neo-Nazi groups on social media, "loved Hitler" and he "wanted to bring back the Nazi ideas of Hitler" according to his classmates.

On 2 July 2025, the trial of a Luxembourger neo-Nazi accused of plotting terror attacks and building a bomb factory in his home begun. In the raid on his property in Strassen, the police uncovered explosive precursors nitroglycerin, urea nitrate, chlorine and the explosive TATP and a finished nail bomb. The material was so dangeous it had to be destroyed on site. The man was a local member of the eco-fascist Green Brigade.

On 18 May 2026, the perpetrators of the 2026 Islamic Center of San Diego shooting, killed three Muslim men, and later died by suicide. One of the perpetrators described themself in the 75-page manifesto that they left, as a "Christian Ecofascist Accelerationist". The manifesto that appeared to have been written by the shooters espoused Islamophobia, antisemitism, accelerationism, homophobia, transphobia, misogyny, nihilistic violent extremism, influence from incel culture, and anti-Trump views. The manifesto also celebrated multiple prior mass shooters, while highlighting the Christchurch Mosque shooting as a specific inspiration for the shooting.

== Criticism ==
The deep ecologic activist and "left biocentrism" advocate David Orton stated in 2000 that the term is pejorative in nature and it has "social ecology roots, against the deep ecology movement and its supporters plus, more generally, the environmental movement. Thus, 'ecofascist' and 'ecofascism', are used not to enlighten but to smear." Orton argued that "it is a strange term/concept to really have any conceptual validity" as there has not "yet been a country that has had an "eco-fascist" government or, to my knowledge, a political organisation which has declared itself publicly as organised on an ecofascist basis." (Note: Since 2000, multiple individuals and groups have self described as ecofascists, including: Pekka-Eric Auvinen; Brenton Tarrant; Patrick Crusius; Green Brigade; Payton S. Gendron)

Accusations of ecofascism have often been made but are usually strenuously denied.

=== Deep ecology ===
Deep ecology is an environmental philosophy that promotes the inherent worth of all living beings regardless of their instrumental utility to human needs. It has long been linked to fascist ideologies, both by critics and fascist proponents. Luc Ferry, in his anti-environmentalist book Le Nouvel Ordre écologique published in 1992, particularly incriminated deep ecology as being an anti-humanist ideology bordering on Nazism. Modern ecofascism has been described as a deep ecological philosophy combined with antihumanism and an accelerationist stance. April Tardif Levesque argues that ideas from deep ecology are selectively applied by ecofascists to align with their nationalist ideals.

Social theorist Murray Bookchin's criticism of the political position of deep ecologists such as David Foreman, also criticises the mystical and irrational thinking that is present in ecofascism:

There are barely disguised racists, survivalists, macho Daniel Boones, and outright social reactionaries who use the word ecology to express their views, just as there are deeply concerned naturalists, communitarians, social radicals, and feminists who use the word ecology to express theirs... It was out of this former kind of crude eco-brutalism that Hitler, in the name of "population control," with a racial orientation, fashioned theories of blood and soil...

The same eco-brutalism now reappears a half-century later among self-professed deep ecologists who believe that Third World peoples should be permitted to starve to death and that desperate Indian immigrants from Latin America should be excluded by the border cops from the United States lest they burden "our" ecological resources.

=== Sakai on "natural purity" ===
Such observations among the left are not exclusive to Bookchin. In his review of Anna Bramwell's biography of Richard Walther Darré, political writer J. Sakai and author of Settlers: The Mythology of the White Proletariat, observes the fascist ideological undertones of natural purity. Prior to the Russian Revolution, the tsarist intelligentsia was divided on the one hand between liberal "utilitarian naturalists", who were "taken with the idea of creating a paradise on earth through scientific mastery of nature" and influenced by nihilism as well as Russian zoologists such as Anatoli Petrovich Bogdanov; and, on the other, "cultural-aesthetic" conservationists such as Ivan Parfenevich Borodin, who were influenced in turn by German Romantic and idealist concepts such as Landschaftspflege and Naturdenkmal.

=== Narrowness of the label ===
Political scientist Balša Lubarda has criticised the use of the term "ecofascism" as not sufficiently covering and describing the wider network of ideologies and systems that feed into ecofascist action, suggesting the term "far-right ecologism" (FRE) instead. Lubarda is supported by researcher Bernhard Forchtner who emphasises ecofascism's existence as a fringe ideology that has had little impact on the wider far-right's interaction with environmentalism.

=== Disavowment ===
As ecofascism has become more prevalent various environmental groups and organisations have publicly disavowed the ideology and those who subscribe to it. These have included the Sierra Club, Earthworks, and the radical environmentalist group Earth First!.

== Far-right green movements ==
In recent years there has been a greater proliferation in ecofascist groups globally in line with the proliferation of ecofascist rhetoric, and a more general increase in far-right and fascist political thought and sentiment.

=== Australia ===
Australia has seen an increasing prominence of ecofascism among its far-right groups in recent years. Scholars have highlighted that Australia is particularly primed for such an increase due to being acutely affected by global warming, having a history of highly restrictive immigration policies, and its geopolitical situation in Oceania in relation to Asia.

=== Austria ===
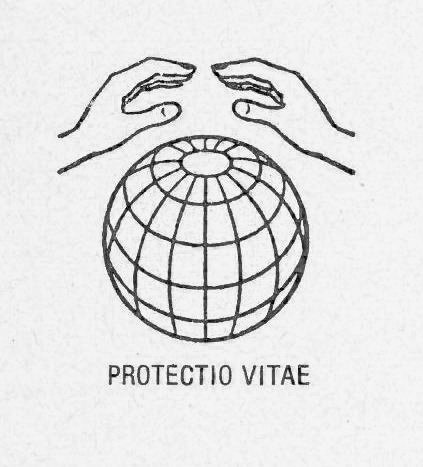
Logo of the World Union for Protection of Life until 2014

By the 1980s neo-Nazis and far-right individuals had managed to take on leading positions in the United Greens of Austria and the Nature Conservation Association of Austria, many also being members of the far-right World Union for Protection of Life. The Greens of Austria (DGÖ) was founded in 1982 by the former National Democratic Party (NDP) official Alfred Bayer to use the popularity of the green movement at the time for the purposes of the NDP. The party managed to win a number of municipal seats in the mid-1980s but in 1988 the Constitutional Court banned the party on grounds of neo-Nazism alongside a parallel ban on the NDP.

=== Denmark ===
The National Socialist Movement of Denmark took part in the 1988 elections in Denmark with the campaign "A Green Denmark for White People", focusing on environmental issues. The party's magazine Fædrelandet championed organic farming and condemned synthetic fertilizers, pharmaceuticals, hormones, pesticides, and genetic modification. A paper by Claus Bundgård Christensen of the University of Roskilde states "there is no doubt that Ecofascist ideological values play a prominent role amongst contemporary Danish National Socialists." Nordic Resistance Movement that is active in Denmark supports green causes and frequently refers to the Danish Nazi leader Povl Riis-Knudsen who promoted ecofascism and Savitri Devi's works.

=== Finland ===
The neo-fascist Blue-and-Black Movement includes ecofascist policy goals, stating that they aim to protect the nature and biodiversity of Finland, and to live in harmony with nature, ending ritual slaughter, fur-farming and animal testing. According to the Finnish Broadcasting Company, the Movement can be described as ecofascist, and one member of the Movement assessed that some young green voters support the existence of the Movement as they are happy that there is an environmentalist option that is also on the political right.

Finnish ecofascist and the author of the book "National Socialism - Ideology of Nature Conservation", Werner Toivonen, has been a featured speaker at significant Finnish extreme right events, including the Suomi Herää (Finland Awakens) march and the "Awakening" conference.

=== France ===
==== Nouvelle Droite movement ====
The European Nouvelle Droite movement, developed by Alain de Benoist and other individuals involved with the GRECE think tank, have also combined various left-wing ideas, including green politics, with right-wing ideas such as European ethnonationalism. Various other far-right figures have taken the lead from de Benoist, providing an appeal to nature in their politics, including: Guillaume Faye, Renaud Camus, and Hervé Juvin.

==== Génération identitaire ====
In 2020, following articles from self-described ecofascist Piero San Giorgio, a spokesperson for Génération identitaire, Clément Martin, advocated for zones identitaires à défendre, ethnically homogenous zones to be violently defended in order to protect the environment.

==== National Rally and Reconquête ====
Marine Le Pen, president of the far-right National Rally (Rassemblement National, or RN) in the French National Assembly, has shown an ecofascist approach towards climate change issue and has incorporated environmental issues into her platform, although her policies regarding the climate often reflect a nationalist and protectionist stance to address it. Le Pen has stated that concern for the climate is inherently nationalist, and that immigrants "do not care about the environment". Jordan Bardella, president of National Rally, embraces similar beliefs and has stated "Borders are the environment’s greatest ally; it is through them we will save the planet."

Solutions for climate change proposed for Le Pen also align with right-wing conservative economics. She has disregarded liberal free trade economics, under her belief that it "kills the planet" and creates "suffering for animals". Rather than supporting mass production of international commerce, she designed a localist project for "economic patriotism" to boost French products.

Climate change was not in the RN's party platform until around 2019, when the issue began to be capitalised electorally by both leftist and centre parties alike. In response to this rising awareness regarding environmental issues, Le Pen designed an energy plan focused on fossil fuels, opposing wind and solar energy, and emphasising expanding nuclear power wherein she delineated a party policy where 70% of France's electricity was to come from nuclear energy by 2050. This change has been identified to have been due in large part to the efforts of Hervé Juvin, a Member of the European Parliament for the National Rally, who pulled from the prior efforts and ideas of the Nouvelle Droite.

Le Pen additionally supports maintaining oil heating systems and reducing taxes on fossil fuels, which contradicts climate experts' recommendations, and could increase France's dependence on fossil fuels. Through the 2022 French presidential election Marine Le Pen, as well as far-right presidential candidate Éric Zemmour for Reconquête, espoused the environmental success of French energy due to the expansive use of nuclear power, greenwashing the French economy. Zemmour further claimed that Reconquête was an ecological party rooted in "local communities", and that issues with the climate were due to the demographics and birth rates of Africa and Asia.

=== Germany ===
Staudenmaier points to how from the post-war period in Germany an ecofascist section has always been present in the German far-right, though as a minor peripheral section, with others pointing out a long history of right-wing individuals and groups being present in the environmental and green movement in Germany.

==== Die Heimat ====
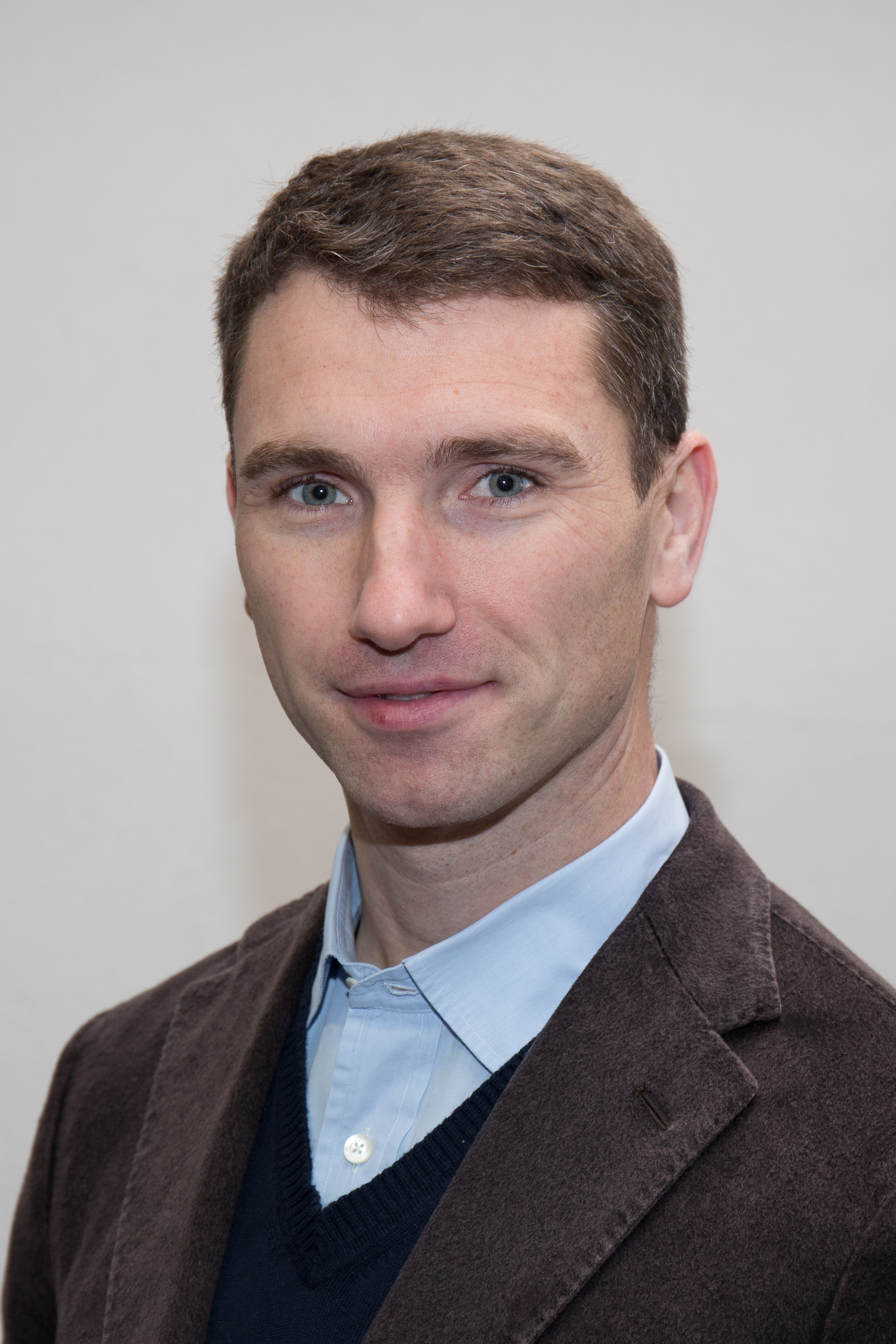
Frank Franz, the leader of the National Democratic Party of Germany from 2014 to 2024, photographed in 2017

Die Heimat (The Homeland), previously known as the National Democratic Party of Germany (NPD), a German Nationalist far-right party, has long sought to utilise the green movement. This is one of many strategies the party has used to try to gain supporters.

The German far-right has published the magazine Umwelt & Aktiv, that masquerades as a garden and nature publication but intertwines garden tips with extremist political ideology. This is known as a "camouflage publication" in which the NPD has spread its mission and ideologies through a discrete source and made its way into homes they otherwise wouldn't. Right-wing environmentalists are settling in the northern regions of rural Germany and are forming nationalistic and authoritarian communities which produce honey, fresh produce, baked goods, and other such farm goods for profit. Their ideology is centered around "blood and soil" ruralism in which they humanely raise produce and animals for profit and sustenance. Through their support of this operation, and the backing of many others, it's reported that the NPD is trying to wrestle the green movement, which has been dominated by the left since the 1980s, back from the left through these avenues.

It's difficult to know if when one is buying local produce or farm fresh eggs from a farmer at their stand, they're supporting a right-wing agenda. Various efforts are being made to halt or slow the infiltration of right-wing ecologists into the community of organic farmers such as brochures about their communities and common practices. However, as the organic cultivation organisation, Biopark, demonstrates with their vetting process, it's difficult to keep people out of communities because of their ideologies. Biopark specifies that they vet based on cultivation habits, not opinions or doctrines, especially when they're not explicitly stated.

==== AfD ====
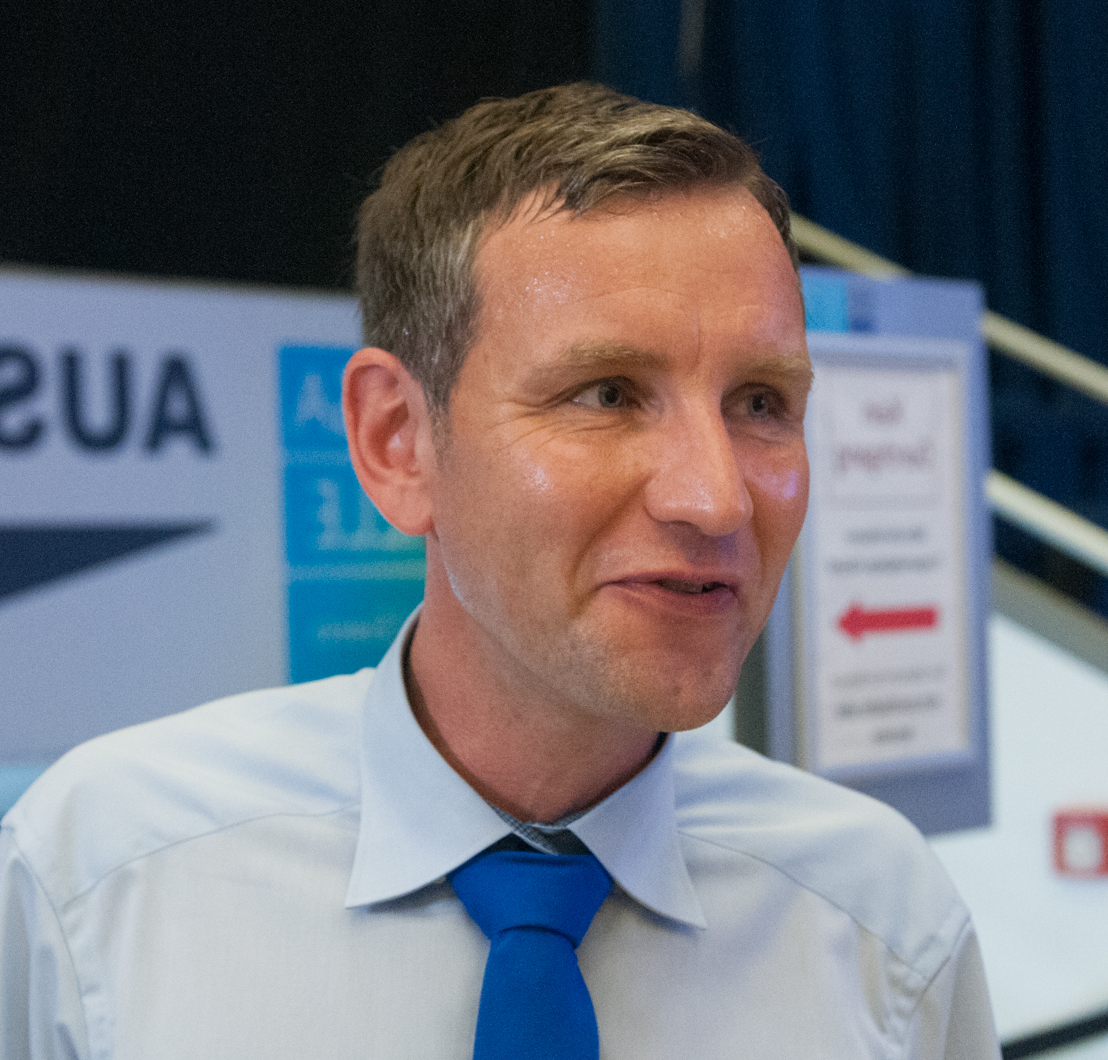
Björn Höcke at the 2015 Alternative für Deutschland Extraordinary Federal Party Congress

In the wake of the Christchurch mosque shootings multiple elected officials of Alternative für Deutschland (Alternative for Germany) referred to Tarrant as a "green fascist", and used the shootings to attack domestic green policies. Anti-fascist watchdog Belltower.News highlighted that many AfD policies and the rhetoric employed across AfD social media accounts aligned more with Tarrant's manifesto than the green policies that the AfD was choosing to attack.

Prominent AfD politician, Björn Höcke, has stated his desire to "reclaim" natural conservation from the left. Höcke believes that nature conservation is not correctly executed under climate justice politics, and is quoted stating that the AfD has "to take the issue of nature conservation back from the Greens" However, Höcke recognises that a socially conservative position that strongly values environmental protection is not the majority position of the AfD. Regardless, Höcke sees the work of far-right ecological magazine, Die Kehre, as laying a theoretical standpoint for the AfD to later draw from. Die Kehre has also repeatedly used the term "ecofascism" as a pejorative against more centrist and left-wing green parties because they place environmental issues above everything else.

==== Collegium Humanum ====
The Collegium Humanum was an ecofascist organisation in Germany from 1963 to 2008. It was established in 1963 as a club, was first active in the German environmental movement, then from the early 1980s became a far-right political organisation and was banned in 2008 by the Federal Minister of the Interior Wolfgang Schäuble due to "continued denial of the Holocaust".

==== Other groups ====
The term is also used to a limited extent within the Neue Rechte. The neo-Artamans have been identified as ecofascists in their attempts to revive the agrarian and völkisch traditions of the Artaman League in communes that they have built up since the 1990s.

=== Greece ===
Greek neo-Nazi Golden Dawn has a Green Wing that defines its difference from the liberal environmental movement: "Our love for nature is different than theirs [the left]: The environment is the cradle of our Race, it mirrors our culture and civilization, making it our duty to protect it." The Green Wing worked as volunteer firemen during the 2018 Attica wildfires and took part in the reforestation projects.

=== Hungary ===
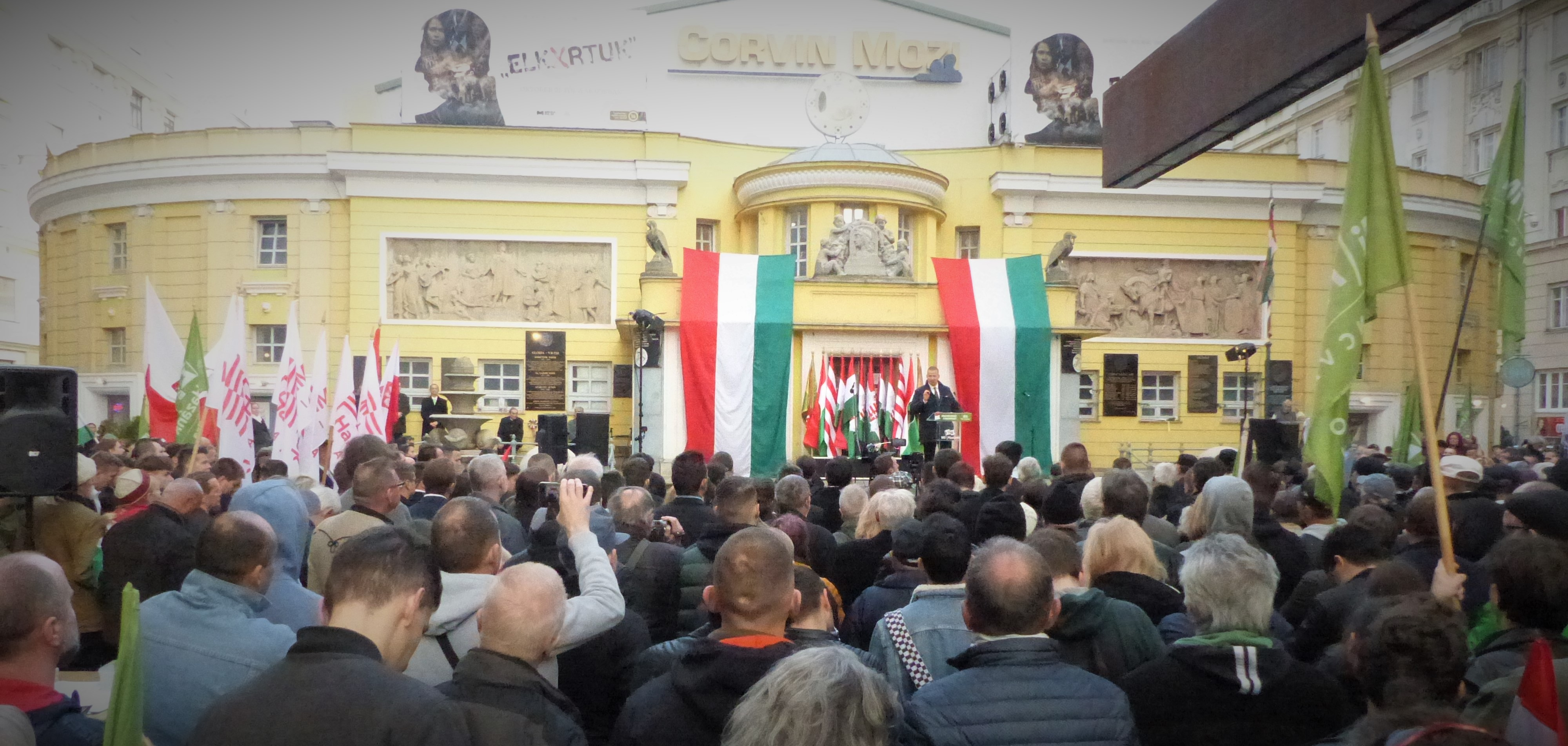
László Toroczkai, leader of the Our Homeland Movement party, speaking at Corvin köz, 2021

Following the fall of Communism in Hungary at the end of the 1980s, one of the new political parties that emerged in the country was the Green Party of Hungary. Initially having a moderate centre-right green outlook, after 1993 the party adopted a radical anti-liberal, anti-communist, antisemitic and pro-fascist stance, paired with the creation of a paramilitary wing. This ideological swing resulted in many members breaking off from the party to form new green parties, first with Green Alternative in 1993 and secondly with Hungarian Social Green Party in 1995. Each green party remained on the political fringe of Hungarian politics and petered out over time. It was not until the formation of LMP – Hungary's Green Party in the 2010s that green politics in Hungary consolidated around a single green party.

The far-right Hungarian political party Our Homeland Movement has adopted some elements of environmentalism, and commonly refers to itself as the only true green party; for example, the party has called on Hungarians to show patriotism by supporting the removal of pollution from the Tisza River while simultaneously placing the blame on the pollution on Romania and Ukraine. Similarly, elements of the far-right Sixty-Four Counties Youth Movement proscribe themselves to the "Eco-Nationalist" label, with one member stating "no real nationalist is a climate denialist".

=== India ===
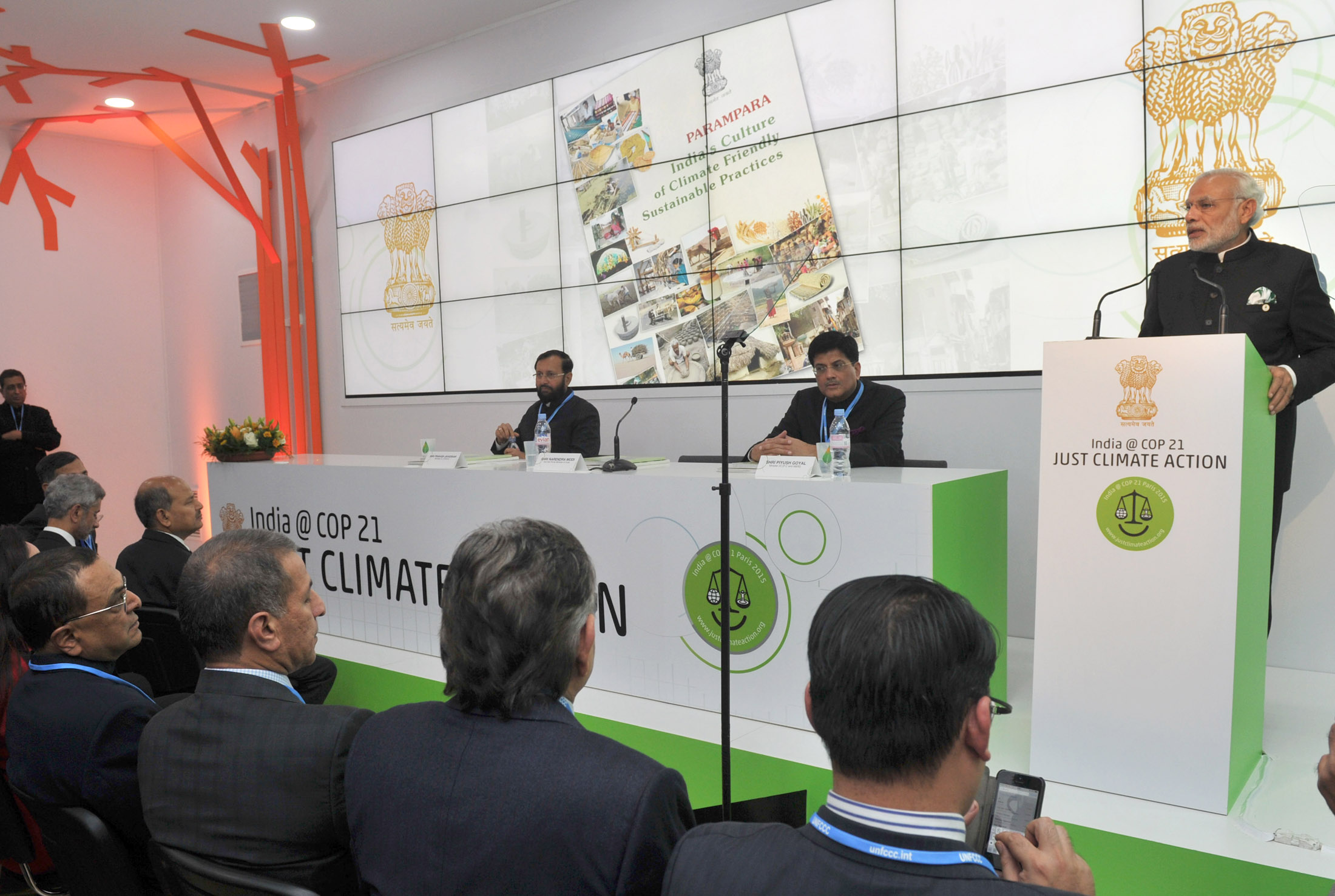
Narendra Modi addressing at the inauguration of the India Pavilion, at COP21

Indian Prime Minister Narendra Modi's leadership of India with the Bharatiya Janata Party seeks to install a complete system of Hindutva, with repression of racial and religious minorities as well as an intensification of caste discrimination. Since 2018 Modi has been increasingly viewed as an environmental champion and used rhetoric about protecting the environment to greenwash his image and the image of his party. The Modi governments have been accused of using environmental justifications to target minority communities in India for oppressive measures and displacement.

In 2022, BJP leader & Assam Chief Minister Himanta Biswa Sarma accused the Muslim minority of 'flood jihad' i.e orchestrating man-made floods in the lowlying Hindu-majority areas of the Brahmaputra Valley by deliberately accelerating deforestation and environmental degradation in the surrounding mountains of Meghalaya. Researchers have also highlighted an increasing securitisation of borders in India in response to climate change.

=== International ===
Greenline Front is an international network of ecofascists which originated in Eastern Europe, with chapters in a variety of countries such as Argentina, Belarus, Chile, Germany, Italy, Poland, Russia, Serbia, Spain and Switzerland. It disseminates propaganda online that rejects anthropocentrism and monotheism while asserting "blood and soil" mythology. Greenline Front also produces less overt propaganda espousing vegetarianism, veganism, and animal rights, as a way to reach more mainstream audiences, with them notably creating images that replicate propaganda previously produced by groups such as the anarchist Animal Liberation Front.

=== Mongolia ===
Tsagaan Khas (Mongolian: Цагаан Хас, lit. 'white swastika') is a Mongolian neo-Nazi organisation. In 2013, the group tried to shift its focus to fighting pollution resulting from mining in Mongolia. Its members have appeared at mining operations, demanding to see paperwork and sometimes sabotaging the operations if they deemed it mismanaged. The group has demanded soil samples from the mining operations, in order to check for soil contamination. According to the founder of the group, the group wants to fulfill a role which the local authorities have supposedly failed at concerning foreign mining companies.

=== Online ===
Ecofascist groups and networks have formed online, where ideology is spread with the use of memes and hashtags which have often featured in terrorist manifestos. These groups and networks are not a singular cohesive movement, but instead disparate parts of a subculture that seeks to blend environmental catastrophism with white supremacy. This prominent digital footprint has been noted in contrast to the idealised return to supposed "natural" and racial orders espoused by such communities.

The memes and propaganda generated by ecofascists often include themes of runes, cottagecore aesthetics, and admiration of ideological inspirations such as Ted Kaczynski.

=== Russia ===
Initially a "patriotic environmental group", Mestnye was run in part by multiple neo-Nazi leaders who eventually took it over. A leader of the violent neo-Nazi United Brigade-88 Sergei Nikulkin is a Mestnye leader. Leonid Simunin, a Mestnye functionary was a supervisor of Russki Obraz, another violent neo-Nazi group. In 2006 groups of Mestnye activists attacked 20 marketplaces in Moscow and detained 73 illegal immigrants, Mestnye leader Sergei Fateev bragging that the neo-Nazi "Movement Against Illegal Immigration is all talk, but we act." Mestnye is also connected to the neo-Nazi "88th Brigade" Espanola, which fights in Ukraine, through the Brigade's founder, who is a member. Furthermore, the green movement provides funding to the brigade.

=== Serbia ===
Leviathan Movement promotes ecology and protects animals from cruelty by, among other things, saving them from abusers. Leviathan has been reported as an ideologically neo-fascist and neo-Nazi group. They used to share an office with the Serbian Right, a far-right political party, and Leviathan's leader, Pavle Bihali, is seen in pictures on his social media accounts posing with neo-Nazis.

=== Sweden ===
The Nordic Resistance Movement, a pan-Nordic neo-Nazi movement in the Nordic countries and a political party in Sweden has been continually described as ecofascist, and have declared themselves as the "new green party" of the Nordics. In their English-language literature they continually link immigration to environmental degradation, as well as linking both to liberalism and the cultural Marxism conspiracy theory.

=== Switzerland ===
In Switzerland, the initiators of the Ecopop initiative were accused of eco-fascism by Federal Department of Foreign Affairs State Secretary Yves Rossier at a Christian Democratic People's Party of Switzerland event on 11 January 2013. However, after threatening to sue, Rossier apologised for the allegation. Ecopop seeks to preserve the environment by reducing population growth globally by focusing on curbing population growth in developing countries, and by greatly restricting and reducing immigration to Switzerland.

=== United Kingdom ===
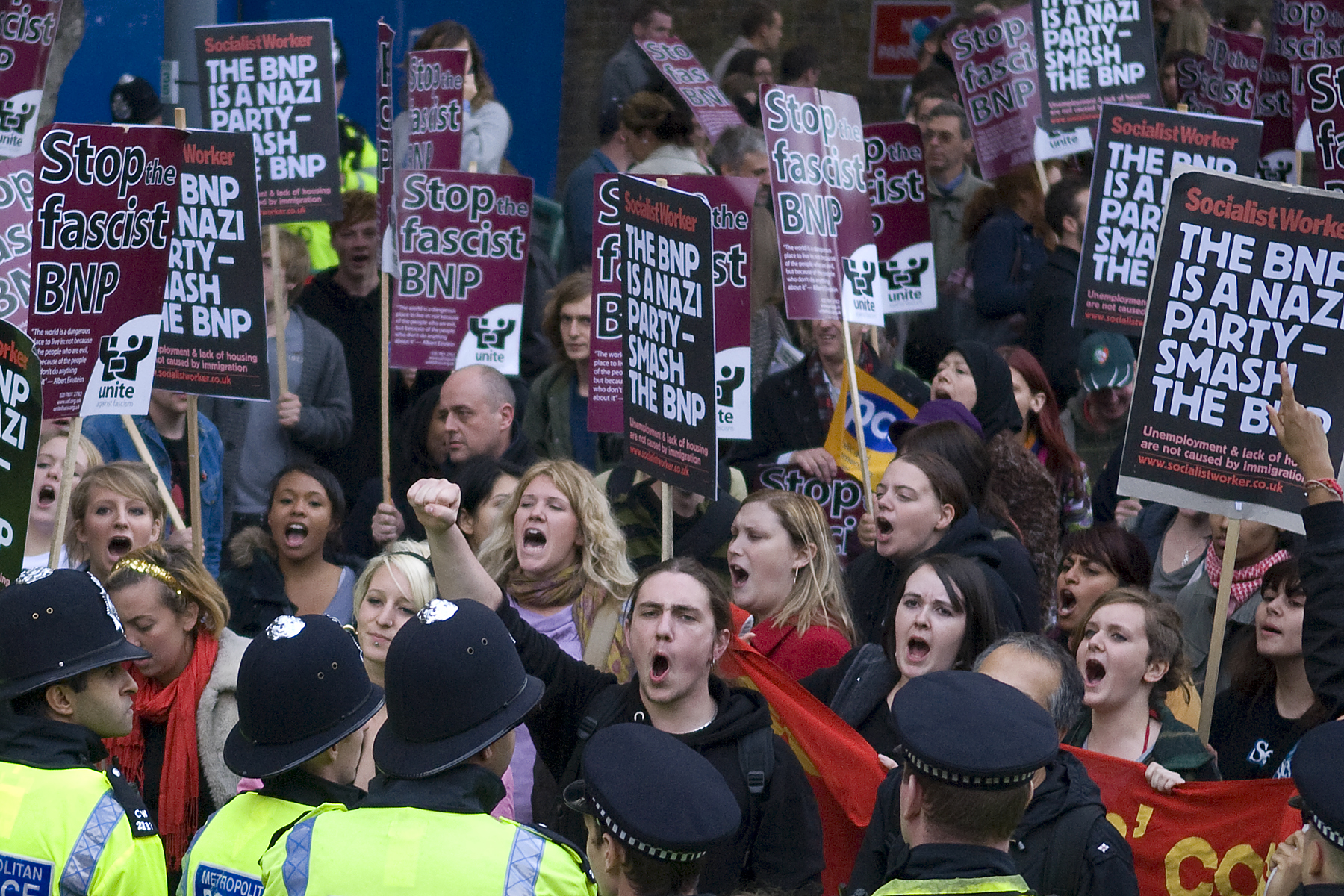
Protestors against Nick Griffin's appearance on Question Time, 2009

There is a historic tradition between the far-right and environmentalism in the UK. Throughout its history, the far-right British National Party has flirted on and off with environmentalism. During the 1970s the party's first leader John Bean expressed support for the emerging environmentalist movement in the pages of the party's newspaper and suggested the primary cause of pollution as overpopulation, and therefore immigration into Britain must be halted. During the 2000s the BNP sought to position itself as the only 'true' green party in the United Kingdom, dedicating a significant portion of their manifestos to green issues. During an appearance on BBC One's Question Time in October 2009, then-leader Nick Griffin proclaimed:

Unlike the fake "Greens" who are merely a front for the far left of the Labour regime, the BNP is the only party to recognise that overpopulation – whose primary driver is immigration, as revealed by the government's own figures – is the cause of the destruction of our environment. Furthermore, the BNP's manifesto states that a BNP government will make it a priority to stop building on green land. New housing should wherever possible be built on derelict "brown land".

The Guardian criticised Griffin's claims that himself and the BNP were truly environmentalists at heart, suggesting it was merely a smokescreen for anti-immigrant rhetoric and pointed to previous statements by Griffin in which he suggested that climate change was a hoax. These suspicions seemed to be proven correct when in December 2009 the BNP released a 40-page document denying that global warming is a "man-made" phenomenon. The party reiterated this stance in 2011, as well as making claims that wind farms were causing the deaths of "thousands of Scottish pensioners from hypothermia". John Bean a far-right activist and politician, the first leader of the BNP and latterly a leader within the National Front, wrote regularly in the National Front’s magazine about the problems of pollution and environmental degradation tying them to ideas of overpopulation and immigration.

In 2024 it was reported by Searchlight that the fascist groups Patriotic Alternative and Homeland party has also started to make claims that the countryside was being destroyed by immigration.

In Scotland, former UKIP candidate and activist Alistair McConnachie, who has denied the Holocaust, founded the Independent Green Voice in 2003, and multiple ex-BNP members and activists have stood as candidates for the party.

=== United States ===
During the 1990s a highly militant environmentalist subculture called Hardline emerged from the straight edge hardcore punk music scene and established itself in a number of cities across the US. Adherents to the Hardline lifestyle combined the straight edge belief in no alcohol, no drugs, no tobacco with militant veganism and advocacy for animal rights. Hardline touted a biocentric worldview that claimed to value all life, and therefore opposed abortion, contraceptives, and sex for any purpose other than procreation. On this same line, Hardline opposed homosexuality as "unnatural" and "deviant". Hardline groups were highly militant; in 1999 Salt Lake City grouped Hardliners as a criminal gang and suggested they were behind dozens of assaults in the metro area. That same year CBS News reported that Hardliners were behind the firebombing of fast food outlets and clothing stores selling leather items, and attributed 30 attacks to Hardliners. The Hardline subculture dissolved after the 1990s.

White supremacist John Tanton and the network of organisations he created, dubbed the Tanton network, have been described as ecofascist. Tanton and his organisations spent decades linking immigration to environmental concerns.

Political researchers Blair Taylor and Eszter Szenes have identified multiple threads in alt-right discourse and ideology that align with far-right ecologism and ecofascism.

The Green Party of the United States has also long been the target of various far-right figures, such as antisemitic conspiracy theorists, who have tried to shift the party drastically to the far-right.

The ecobordering engaged in by right-wing politicians such as Mark Brnovich, alongside rhetoric that espouses the greatness of the clean environment and natural resources within United States, while enacting policies that remove environmental protections under recent administrations, has been highlighted as an adoption of ecofascist narratives in US government.

== Pejorative ==
Detractors on the political right tend to use the term "ecofascism" as a hyperbolic general pejorative against all environmental activists, including more mainstream groups such as Greenpeace, prominent activists such as Greta Thunberg, and government agencies tasked with protecting environmental resources. Such detractors include Rush Limbaugh and other conservative and wise use movement commentators. The term as a pejorative has been used in multiple countries.

In 1994, so-called "Takings" bills (Note: Such as the Comprehensive Wetlands Conservation and Management Act of 1994) were introduced by the U.S. Congress to financially compensate wetlands owners who were unable to develop their land for profit due to environmental protection policies. These bills were met with resistance by "anthropocentric market liberals", who oppose any sort of market regulation or intervention of the state into private ownership. Hence, these "takings" bills were deemed ecofascist and proponents of the bills were "disparaged" and viewed as "'nature-loving' romantics for having reactionary tendencies that may be consistent with fascism". Philosopher Michael E. Zimmerman uses this instance to exemplify how growing public frustration with complex federal environmental regulations leads to rapidly polarising opinions on environmental regulations in the United States: one is either a citizen who supports people, private property, and the U.S. Constitution, or a radical environmentalist who supports nature, communal ownership, and ecofascism. Other policies and positions which are viewed as inhibiting human action to protect the environment have also been described as forms of "environmental fascism" by detractors.

== See also ==
- Adolf Hitler and vegetarianism
- Animal welfare in Nazi Germany
- ATWA
- Conspirituality
- Definitions of fascism
- Ecoauthoritarianism
- Ecocapitalism
- Eco-nationalism
- Eco-socialism
- Eco-terrorism
- Environmental movement
- Environmental racism
- Green Imperialism
- Invasive species
- Neo-Luddism
- Pastel QAnon
- Radical environmentalism
- Red-green-brown alliance
- Mike Ma
