= Raw Egg Nationalist =

British far-right influencer and conspiracy theorist

- Born: Charles Cornish-Dale
- Citizenship: British
- Education: University of Exeter (BA); Lincoln College, Oxford (DPhil)
- Writing career
- Notable works: Raw Egg Trilogy, The Eggs Benedict Option
- Website: www.raweggnationalist.com

Charles Cornish-Dale, better known by his online alias Raw Egg Nationalist (REN), is a British far-right influencer and conspiracy theorist. He is the editor of the magazine Man's World, published in print by Passage Press. He appeared on Tucker Carlson's documentary The End of Men in 2022, increasing his popularity. He was a pseudonymous writer until 2024, when his identity was revealed by the British advocacy group Hope not Hate.

He has written several books promoting his views on nutrition and fitness, including Raw Egg Nationalism and The Eggs Benedict Option. REN has been noted as an influential voice in online communities, advocating the carnivore diet and raw food movement, as well as bodybuilding. He has advocated for white nationalism, and promoted conspiracy theories relating to anti-globalism, particularly the Great Reset initiative and the Great Replacement.

== Biography ==
Cornish-Dale graduated with his undergraduate history degree from the University of Exeter, then completed doctoral studies at the University of Oxford, where he earned a Doctor of Philosophy (D.Phil.) in 2018 as a member of Lincoln College, Oxford. His doctoral thesis, Migrations of the Holy: The Devotional Culture of Wimborne Minster, c.1400-1640, considers the religious history of a Dorset parish. Cornish-Dale lectured at Lincoln College.

His identity was revealed by the British advocacy group Hope not Hate in 2024, leading him to write under his real name for The Spectator.

== Work and views ==
REN's popularity grew from the online dissident right space beginning in the 2020s. In 2022, he appeared on Tucker Carlson's one-hour documentary special The End of Men on Fox News, as did Robert F. Kennedy Jr. His appearance in the documentary sharply increased his popularity. As of January 2025, REN has more than 264,000 X followers. In 2022, the Global Network on Extremism and Technology (GNET) called him "a key thinker" in both Frogtwitter and the online Right Wing Bodybuilder community, while political scientist Josh Vandiver said his work represented "the body politic conceived in virile as well as racial terms". He is an associate of Bronze Age Pervert (BAP); both share concern about xenoestrogens and their potential impact on the male body. Vandiver criticized REN's position on this, arguing REN's actual concern was less about the health of the average man, instead being focused on "superlative male flourishing". On his X, he has quoted Mein Kampf, has espoused the great replacement conspiracy, and has promoted eugenics.

REN promotes bodybuilding, while also promoting racist conspiracy theories and far-right ethnonationalism. The magazine Compact deemed him "one of the brighter stars in a sprawling constellation of rightwing social-media influencers who exalt nature, tradition, and physical fitness". American magazine Vanity Fair noted him as a "masculinist health guru". He has promoted conspiracy theories relating to anti-globalism, particularly relating to the Great Reset initiative. The Great Reset initiative is a green growth initiative by the World Economic Forum, aiming to resolve climate change concerns and issues stemming from the COVID-19 pandemic; the initiative has been the subject of numerous conspiracy theories. Vice President of the United States JD Vance follows him on X.

REN was a speaker at the 2023 Natal Conference in Austin, Texas that featured many racist internet and far-right media figures.

=== Dietary ===
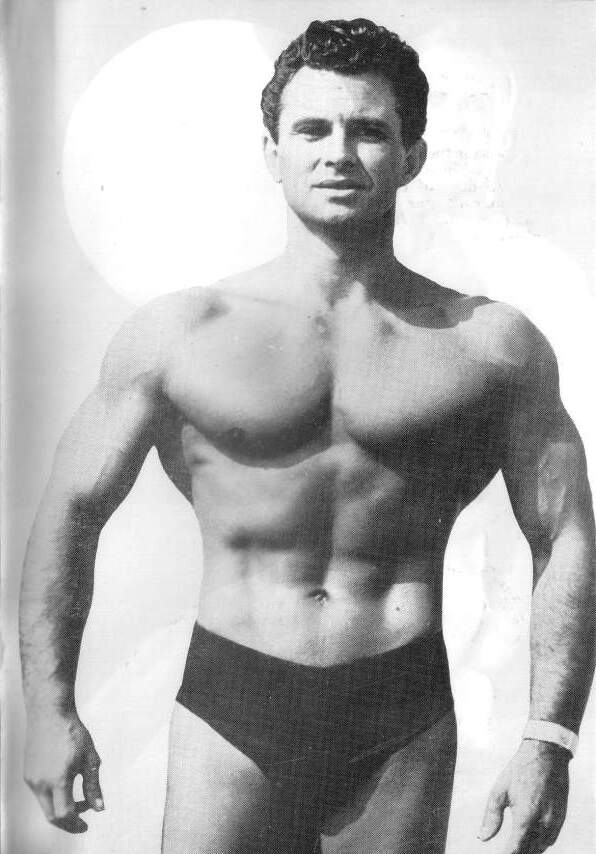
REN's online avatars feature pictures of bodybuilder Vince Gironda.

REN is a prominent and influential figure in the online carnivore diet and raw food movement. His online avatars utilize photos of American bodybuilder Vince Gironda, with whom he shares a belief in raw eggs as a "superfood", hence his pseudonym. He promotes an animal-based raw food diet, including organ meat, raw milk, raw honey, as well as the consumption of animal fats and olive oil. REN has argued that ancient humans were hypercarnivores and similar to the Liver King has advocated the consumption of liver.

REN has promoted the pseudoscientific carnivore diet and has been described as "market[ing] the carnivore diet primarily to those interested in racial hierarchy, nationalism, and anti-migrant attitudes". REN's position has been described as "carnivore traditionalism" as he encourages the consumption of vast amounts of eggs and meat. REN has argued that consumption of animal source foods, especially raw eggs and organ meat is a gateway to a higher, spiritual order of existence and has claimed that that plant-based diets are destroying Western civilization through "soy globalism". He has commented that "eating a low-fat vegetarian diet is about the worst thing you can do. It just tanks testosterone". In 2022, REN described plant-based meat substitutes as "perverted" products pushed to bring civilization to a "brink of madness". In 2023, REN promoted a debunked conspiracy that flavor enhancers made from fetal tissue were used to make Pepsi.

The World Economic Forum had in 2016 predicted that in 2030 people would eat far less meat, which Great Reset opponents view as evidence of a conspiracy to control the behavior of the populace. REN alleged this was connected to the rise in meat prices due to inflation from 2021 to 2022, which he said served the purpose of "globalists" to stop people from eating meat. He has compared the proscribed vegetarianism in Plato's Republic as a tool of social control to the Great Reset's supposed goals for food, to create "a food-dependent, and thus more domesticated, population"; he advocates local consumption of produce, regenerative agriculture, and decentralization of agriculture to fight against the Great Reset. He praised the success of Trump's 2024 presidential campaign as indicating a surge in "testosterone politics". During Robert F. Kennedy Jr.'s nomination for United States Secretary of Health and Human Services, REN indicated his support for the nomination. He has argued that it is "compassionate" to question whether transgender status may be influenced by endocrine disruptors.

=== Man's World ===
REN is the editor of the far-right men's magazine Man's World, which was launched during the COVID-19 pandemic. The magazine was online-only until a physical edition began to be published by Passage Press. The magazine is aimed to appeal to young white men, with its chief concern being "the decline of national manhood in America and Europe under a barrage of nefarious forces", resulting in what it calls a "clown world". Topics covered include political theory and history, as well as diet and fitness advice. Issues include archaic language, appeals to history, and references to "golden age" bodybuilders, in a joking tone. They also include both real and fake advertisements, "borderline homoerotic fashion and fitness" photography, and fantasy and historical fiction. Nomadic steppe warriors from Central Asia are celebrated within the magazine, declared "the most murderous people of all time" as contrasted with supposedly feminized and sedentary societies, described as the "longhouse". The magazine promotes pseudoscientific health advice. Scott Burnett called Man's World and REN "a paradigm case of how masculinity is being articulated at the heart of rightwing politics", with some content in the magazine being "fascist, sometimes bordering on neo-Nazi", but utilizing "an ironic gauze".

The magazine maligns "degeneracy", as embodied by the idea of the "coomer" (a wojak meme of a man who is addicted to masturbation), with the magazine criticizing masturbation. In Man's World Issue 1, REN included vintage centerfolds of nude women. He apologized for this in the next issue's editorial, saying that he had intended to "evoke a time before the advent of readily available internet pornography", but that even softcore pornography was "the thin end of the wedge [...] for the ubiquitous filth that is doing such harm to the minds and bodies of men, women and children everywhere". The accelerationist novellas Harassment Architecture and its sequel Gothic Violence, authored by Mike Ma, were advertised in the magazine. REN has claimed the publication's circulation to be over 150,000 copies, though this may be an exaggeration.

=== Books ===
==== Raw Egg Trilogy ====
The Raw Egg Trilogy is made up of three self-published books, all published in 2020: Raw Egg Nationalism in Theory and Practice, Three Lives of Golden Age Bodybuilders, and Draw Me a Gironda.

==== The Eggs Benedict Option ====
In 2022, white nationalist publisher Antelope Hill Publishing published his book The Eggs Benedict Option, about "the globalist plan for food." It, for a time, ranked highly on Amazon's Agricultural and Food Policy sales list. Its foreword was written by Noor Bin Laden, and the book is named after Rod Dreher's 2017 book The Benedict Option. The Eggs Benedict Option is mostly about nutrition and agriculture, but also mixes this with white nationalism. It argues for humanity to stop supporting the modern food system, which REN argues is run by the "enemies of human freedom", who "want you to be fat, sick, depressed, and isolated, the better to control you". He argues for more responsible farming practices and criticizes companies like Monsanto, as well as the practices of monoculture and industrial factory farming, calling the latter "an abomination". It also advocates for backyard gardening and a return of bison farming.

Political scientist Josh Vandiver called it a "manifesto-cum-cookbook for surviving modern life." American progressive magazine Mother Jones criticized The Eggs Benedict Option, saying it had "half-baked and incoherent solutions you'd expect from a right-wing populist—often stumbling into paranoia along the way", and said it read like "Tucker Carlson tried to write The Omnivore's Dilemma". They also said that it "could be mistaken at times for a hippie manifesto", that stitched together "legitimate gripes" about the nutrition ecosystem with "fearmongering about government meat confiscation and calls to white nationalism".

==== Raw Egg Nationalism Cookbook ====
Raw Egg Nationalism was also published by Antelope Hill Publishing in 2022. The book describes its eponymous ideology as "a physical and political ethic built around the massive consumption of raw eggs", what it calls "one of the most perfect natural foods in existence". This is in resistance to "forces [...] that are leading the anti-human political crusade that seeks to crush the human spirit and destroy the nations, all in the name of profit and global political control." It advocates a diet of "slonking" (gulping down whole) 36 raw eggs a day, as allegedly practiced by Vince Gironda.

==== The Last Men ====
The Last Men: Liberalism and the Death of Masculinity was published by the conservative Regnery Publishing in 2026. The book promotes a conspiracy theory that contemporary liberalism has precipitated a global decline in testosterone. It argues that endocrine disrupting chemicals in microplastic, plant-based diets, processed foods and modern culture hostile to traditional masculinity is to blame for testosterone levels dropping worldwide.

== Publications ==
=== As Charles Cornish-Dale ===
- —— (3 July 2017). "'A Pint of These Maiden Cuthburga Oats': The Cult of St Cuthburga at Thelsford Priory, Warwickshire, October 1538". Midland History. 42 (2): 183–193. doi:10.1080/0047729X.2017.1376374. ISSN 0047-729X.
- —— (2018). "Cuthburga and Saint King Henry: Two Royal Cults at Wimborne Minster, Dorset, 1403–1538". The Sixteenth Century Journal. 49 (4): 963–986. doi:10.1086/SCJ4904001. ISSN 0361-0160. JSTOR 27038575.
- —— (June 2018). Migrations of the Holy: The Devotional Culture of Wimborne Minster, c.1400-1640 (PhD thesis). University of Oxford.
- —— (2026). The Last Men: Liberalism and the Death of Masculinity. Regnery Publishing. ISBN 978-1-5107-8678-3.

=== As Raw Egg Nationalist ===
- —— (2021). Raw Egg Trilogy. Raw Egg Nationalist Presents. Self-published.
  - —— (2020). Raw Egg Nationalism in Theory and Practice: Cook Good with the Raw Egg Nationalist. Raw Egg Nationalist Presents. Self-published.
  - —— (2020). Three Lives of Golden Age Bodybuilders. Raw Egg Nationalist Presents. Self-published.
  - —— (2020). Draw Me a Gironda. Raw Egg Nationalist Presents. Self-published.
- —— (2022). The Eggs Benedict Option. Antelope Hill Publishing. ISBN 978-1-956887-26-6.
- —— (2021). Raw Egg Nationalism Cookbook. Antelope Hill Publishing. ISBN 978-1-953730-84-8.
- —— (2024). Anonymously Yours: The Essays, 2020-2024. Self-published. ISBN 979-8-32-883772-9.
- —— (2024). Germania: A New Translation and Commentary. Self-published. ISBN 979-8-34-405114-7.
