= Walther Schoenichen =

German biologist

Walther Schoenichen (July 18, 1876 – November 22, 1956) was a German biologist and a prominent proponent of nature conservation within Nazi Germany.

Schoenichen was born in Cologne and went to school at the Francke Foundations. He studied natural sciences in Halle and obtained his doctorate in 1898. From 1898 to 1913, he worked as a teacher at the Royal Academy in Posen.

In 1922 Schoenichen became manager of the Staatliche Stelle für Naturdenkmalpflege in Preußen (Prussian State Agency for Natural Heritage Preservation). In 1933, Schoenichen joined the Nazi Party and became head of the Reichsstelle für Naturschutz (Reich Agency for Nature Conservation) when it was founded in 1935. He retired from the position in 1938 when he was replaced by Hans Klose. In 1942, he published his magnum opus, Naturschutz als völkische und internationale Kulturaufgabe (Nature Conservation as a Racial and International Cultural Task). Schoenichen was an antisemite for much of his career, writing in 1926 that "[the German] people face a decline in racial hygiene", and described advertising billboards as an "infection with Jewish toxin."

In 1948, three years after the Second World War, Schoenichen moved to Goslar. From 1949 until his death, he was a professor at the Technical University of Braunschweig. Schoenichen died in Göppingen.

== Publications ==
- Die Abstammungslehre im Unterrichte der Schule, Sammlung naturwissenschaftlich-pädagogischer Abhandlungen (volume 1, issue 3), Leipzig and Berlin 1903
- Tierriesen der Vorzeit, Velhagen & Klasings Volksbücher Nr. 50, Bielefeld and Leipzig (1912?)
- Der deutsche Wald, Velhagen & Klasings Volksbücher Nr. 87, Bielefeld and Leipzig 1913
- In collaboration with Max Popp: Unsere Volksernährung auf der Grundlage unserer Landwirtschaft, Leipzig 1917
- Praktikum der Insektenkunde nach biologisch-ökologischen Gesichtspunkten, Jena 1918 (3rd, expanded edition 1930)
- Von Waffen und Werkzeug der Tiere und Pflanzen, Leipzig 1918
- Der biologische Unterricht in der neuen Erziehung, Leipzig 1919
- Einführung in die Biologie. Ein Hilfsbuch für höhere Lehranstalten und für den Selbstunterricht, Leipzig 1920
- Mikroskopisches Praktikum der Blütenbiologie. Für Studierende, Lehrer und Freunde der Blumenwelt, Leipzig 1922
- In collaboration with other authors: Der biologische Lehrausflug. Ein Handbuch für Studierende und Lehrer aller Schulgattungen, Jena 1922
- Mikroskopische Untersuchungen zur Biologie der Samen und Früchte, Freiburg im Breisgau 1923
- Biologie der Blütenpflanzen. Eine Einführung an der Hand mikroskopischer Übungen, Biologische Studienbücher (volume 2), Freiburg im Breisgau 1924
- Tiere der Vorzeit, Wege zum Wissen 4, Berlin 1924
- Merkbuch für Naturdenkmalpflege. Staatliche Stelle für Naturdenkmalpflege in Preußen, Berlin 1925
- Neues Schmetterlingsbuch, Naturschutz-Bücherei (volume 1), Berlin-Lichterfelde 1925
- In collaboration with other authors: Vom grünen Dom. Ein deutsches Wald-Buch, München 1926
- In collaboration with Philipp Depdolla: Methodik und Technik des naturgeschichtlichen Unterrichts, Handbuch des naturwissenschaftlichen und mathematischen Unterrichts (volume 5), Leipzig 1926 [published 1925]
- Naturschutz und Arbeitsschule, Naturschutz-Bücherei (volume 8), Berlin-Lichterfelde 1928
- Geweihte Stätten der Weltstadt. Grabmäler Berlins und was sie uns künden, Langensalza 1928 (2nd edition Berlin/Leipzig 1929)
- Deutschkunde im naturgeschichtlichen Unterricht, Handbuch der Deutschkunde (volume 7), Frankfurt am Main 1928
- Der Umgang mit Mutter Grün. Ein Sünden- und Sittenbuch für jedermann, Naturschutz-Bücherei (volume 11), Berlin-Lichterfelde 1929 (3rd edition 1951)
- ABC-Naturschutzführer, Handweiser der Staatlichen Stelle für Naturdenkmalpflege in Preußen (volume 1), Neudamm 1931
- „Das deutsche Volk muss gereinigt werden“. Und die deutsche Landschaft? In: Naturschutz (14th year, volume 11), Neudamm and Berlin 1933
- Deutsche Waldbäume und Waldtypen, Jena 1933
- Urwaldwildnis in deutschen Landen. Bilder vom Kampf des deutschen Menschen mit der Urlandschaft, Neudamm 1934
- Naturschutz im Dritten Reich. Einführung in Wesen und Grundlagen zeitgemäßer Naturschutz-Arbeit, Naturschutz-Bücherei (volume 12), Berlin 1934
- Zauber der Wildnis in deutscher Heimat. Urkunden vom Wirken der Naturgewalten im Bilde der deutschen Landschaft, Neudamm 1935
- Urdeutschland. Deutschlands Naturschutzgebiete in Wort und Bild, 2 volumes, 1935 and 1937
- In collaboration with Werner Weber: Das Reichsnaturschutzgesetz vom 26. Juni 1935 (RGBl. I S. 821) und die Verordnung zur Durchführung des Reichsnaturschutzgesetzes vom 31. Oktober 1935 (RGBl. I S. 1275), Berlin 1936
- Jagd und Naturschutz, Neudamm and Berlin 1937
- In collaboration with Erich Schröder (illustrations): Die in Deutschland geschützten Pflanzen nach der Naturschutzverordnung vom 18. März 1936. Reichsstelle für Naturschutz, Berlin-Lichterfelde 1938 (2nd, expanded and improved edition 1941)
- In collaboration with Erich Schröder (illustrations) et al.: Taschenbuch der in Deutschland geschützten Tiere. Nach der Naturschutzverordnung vom 18. März 1936, Berlin-Lichterfelde 1938
- Biologie der Landschaft, Landschaftsschutz und Landschaftspflege (issue 3), Neudamm and Berlin 1939
- Biologie der geschützten Pflanzen Deutschlands. Eine Einführung in die lebenskundliche Betrachtung heimischer Gewächse, Jena 1940
- Naturschutz als völkische und internationale Kulturaufgabe. Eine Übersicht über die allgemeinen, die geologischen, botanischen, zoologischen und anthropologischen Probleme des heimatlichen wie des Weltnaturschutzes, Jena 1942
- Aus Wald und Feld den Tisch bestellt, Berlin-Halensee and Bielefeld 1947
- Die Giraffen von Nyassa, Berlin-Halensee 1947
- Große Forscher, kühne Entdecker. Band 1, Berlin-Halensee 1949
- Von deutschen Bäumen, Berlin 1950
- Natur als Volksgut und Menschheitsgut. Eine Einführung in Wesen und Aufgaben des Naturschutzes, Stuttgart/Ludwigsburg 1950
- Blüten laden zu Gast, Berlin 1951
- Biologie in Stichworten, 2 volumes, Kiel 1951 and 1954
- Unter den Bäumen der alten Reichsstadt Goslar, Hannover 1952
- Naturschutz – Heimatschutz. Ihre Begründung durch Ernst Rudorff, Hugo Conwentz und ihre Vorläufer, Große Naturforscher (volume 16), Stuttgart 1954
