= Mars InSight Roadshow =

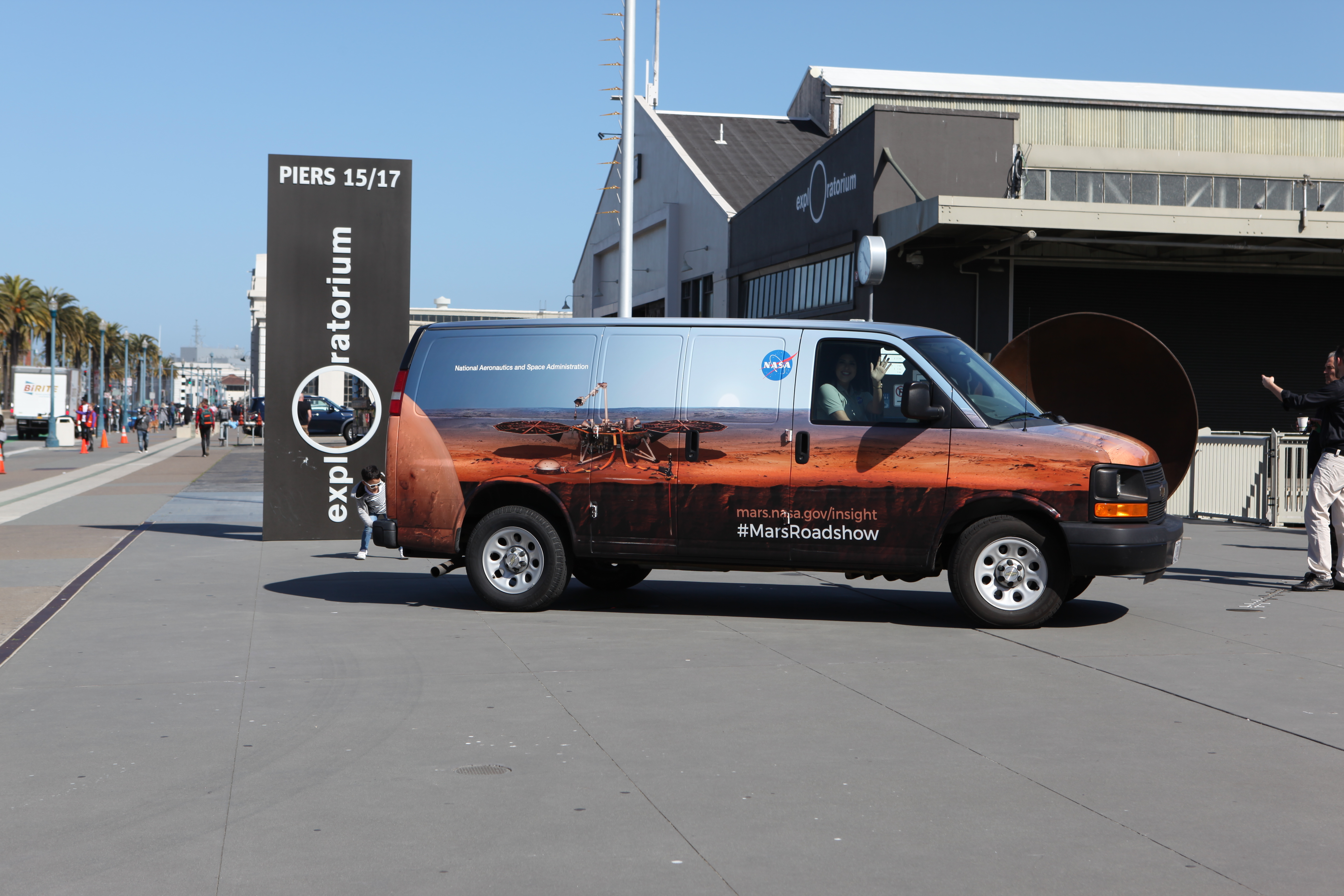
A vehicle that supported the Mars InSight Roadshow

Mars InSight Roadshow was a traveling exhibit/activity center for education and public outreach in support of the InSight Mars lander and space exploration and space science. Supported by caravan of vehicles, the roadshow functioned as an exhibit for institutions and/or events and also conducted public talks. The roadshow was staffed by people from the InSight mission, science teams, and/or members of NASA. One of the tasks was to explain the mission and to increase awareness about research and science. The roadshow included talks, exhibits, and activities that were available at certain times and locations as the roadshow travelled to different locations.

== History ==
In the summer of 2018, while InSight was coasting through interplanetary space, the Mars InSight roadshow toured southern California in the United States.

The roadshow visited Turtle Bay Exploration Park.

On April 28, 2018, it visited the Cal Poly (California Polytechnic State University), and on April 29, 2018, Mars InSight Roadshow visited the San Luis Obispo Children's Museum. The roadshow also visited the Santa Maria Discovery Museum, and the Orange Country Discovery Cube.

Summer of 2018 tours and location in Southern California (examples):

- June 29-July 1, 2018: Santa Ana
  - Discovery Cube Orange County
- July 4, 2018 : Pasadena
  - AmericaFest at the Rose Bowl
- August 3–5, 2018: San Diego
  - San Diego Air & Space Museum

In August 2018, the Mars InSight Roadshow visited the visitor center of the Goldstone Deep Space Communications array for two days.

On September 20 and 21st of 2018 the roadshow visited Silicon Valley.

== Exhibits and staff ==
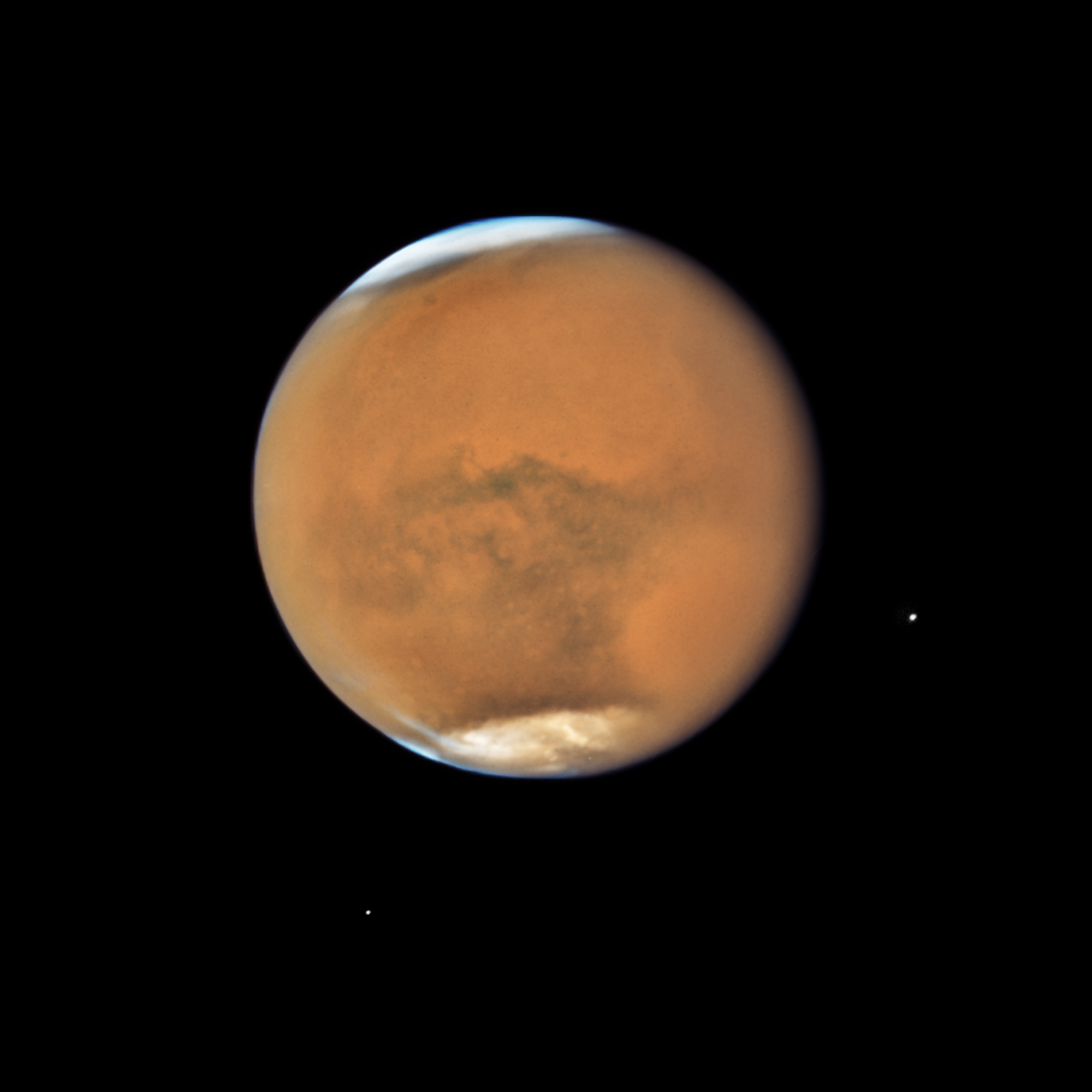
Planet Mars

Examples of exhibits in the traveling roadshow included:

- Make Your Own Marsquake interactive featurette
- Selfie stations
- Scale models of the InSight spacecraft and of planet Mars
- Virtual reality headsets with displays of Mars

Roadshow staff included:

- InSight mission and science staff
- NASA's Mars public engagement team from JPL
- NASA Solar System Ambassadors
