= Gregory Dreicer =

American historian

- Occupations: curatorial strategist, historian and museum manager

Gregory Dreicer is an American curatorial strategist, historian, experience designer, exhibition developer, and museum manager. Dreicer's multidisciplinary projects, which engage audiences in discovering and exploring everyday environments, have led public discussion on issues including infrastructure, landscape, architecture, city planning, community identity, preservation, design, and sustainability. Dreicer's work is known for innovative strategies in project conception and design that create memorable experiences.

== Public history and museums ==
Dreicer has developed institutional visitor plans and curated more than 25 multidisciplinary exhibition projects. These projects, which often focus on story, community, and place, emphasize the indivisible nature of natural, designed, and social environments. Embedding inclusivity, questioning myths, and exploring multiple perspectives characterize pathbreaking projects aimed at engaging broad audiences. Dreicer has developed exhibitions and programs for organizations including the Vancouver Public Library, Museum of Vancouver, National Building Museum, Museum of the City of New York, and the Smithsonian Institution Museum on Main Street program. Dreicer's projects have featured Black Americans, Latine, Indigenous peoples, Asian communities, and Jews. At the Museum of Vancouver, Dreicer developed an institutional vision based on social connection. At the Chicago Architecture Foundation, Dreicer developed the institutional thematic framework, was responsible for the creation of the master plan for a new facility, and developed a large-scale model of Chicago that made the CAF facility a destination. His projects have focused on issues including fences and land use; water supply systems; lighting and city life; preservation; livable communities; energy efficiency; and skyscraper engineering and architecture.

== Scholarship ==
Dreicer's scholarly research and publications investigate ongoing processes of change, rather than landscapes and buildings as static objects. His work, focused on the reinvention of construction, demonstrates the fundamental role of building in industrialization and nation-building. This transnational investigation of design in action demonstrates how evolutionism and nationalism, which have shaped common understandings of technology, are entwined in the process of invention itself. In articles such as "Nouvelles inventions: l’interchangeabilité et le génie national" in Culture Technique and "Influence and Intercultural Exchange: the Case of Engineering Schools and Civil Engineering Works in the Nineteenth Century" in History and Technology, Dreicer explores invention as a process of exchange among individuals while emphasizing the thinking behind the history of building, landscape, and architecture. In articles such as "Building Myths: The ‘Evolution’ from Wood to Iron in the Construction of Bridges and Nations" in Perspecta, Dreicer explores the myths and metaphors that still form understandings of history and technology. In "Building Bridges and Boundaries: The Lattice and the Tube, 1820-1860" in Technology and Culture he analyzes the relationship between the construction of engineering infrastructure and national identity.

== Education and academic career ==
Dreicer completed a PhD in Science and Technology Studies at Cornell University and a Masters in Historic Preservation at the Columbia University Graduate School of Architecture, Planning and Preservation. Dreicer's post-doctoral academic positions include a Senior Fellowship at the Smithsonian Institution's Lemelson Center for the Study of Invention and Innovation, a Loeb Fellowship at the Harvard University Graduate School of Design, and a fellowship at the Cullman Center for Scholars and Writers at the New York Public Library. Dreicer has taught at the Parsons School of Design and MIT School of Architecture and Planning. He previously worked in New York City as an architectural conservator specializing in the restoration and repair of high-rise building facades.

Museum of Vancouver

- Unbelievable (2017)
- Your Future Home: Creating the New Vancouver (2016)
- makesmehappy (2016)

Chicago Architecture Foundation

- Loop Value: The How Much Does It Cost? Shop (2012–13)
- Chicago Model City (2009–10)
- Green With Desire: Can We Live Sustainably in Our Homes? (2008)
- Do We Dare Squander Chicago’s Great Architectural Heritage? Preserving Chicago, Making History (2008)
- Chicago: You Are Here (2007–2012)

Smithsonian Institution Traveling Exhibition Service - Museum on Main Street (national travel)

- Between Fences (2005–2012)
- Barn Again! (1997–2005)

American Society of Civil Engineers

- Me, Myself and Infrastructure (New York Historical Society, National Building Museum, One Market [San Francisco], Turtle Bay Exploration Park, 2002–2003, Chicago Architecture Foundation, 2007)

Museum of the City of New York

- Transformed by Light: The New York Night (2005)
- New York Comes Back: Mayor Ed Koch and the City (2005)
- Trade (2004)
- Perform (2004)

Afikim Foundation (national travel)

- When Humanity Fails (2006)

New York Public Library Science, Industry and Business Library

- I on Infrastructure (2002)

National Building Museum

- Between Fences (1996)
- Barn Again! (1994)

== Selected publications ==
- American Bridge: Reinventing Building, Making History (Cambridge, MA: MIT Press/Lemelson Center, Smithsonian Institution, 2026). ISBN 978-0-262-55211-0
- Me, Myself, and Infrastructure: Private Lives and Public Works in America (Washington, DC: ASCE, 2002) ISBN 0-7844-0611-1
- "Standardization," "Maurice Koechlin," "Alfred Henry Neville," "Wilhelm Nördling," and "Ithiel Town." In Antoine Picon, ed., L’art de l’ingénieur: constructeur, entrepreneur, inventeur (Paris, France: Centre Georges Pompidou, 1997). ISBN 2-85850-911-5
- "Wired! The Fence Industry and the Invention of Chain Link." In Gregory Dreicer, ed., Between Fences (Washington, D.C./New York: National Building Museum/Princeton Architectural Press, 1996). ISBN 1-56898-080-9
- La Manufacture des Tabacs de Lyon: Historique, Analyse Architecturale, Reconversion. Report for Ministère de la Culture, Direction Régionale des Affaires Culturelles, Inventaire Général des Monuments et des Richesses Artistiques de la France, Région Rhone-Alpes, Lyon, France, August 1987.
- “Nouvelles inventions: l’interchangeabilité et le génie national.” Culture Technique 26 (1992): 213-220.
- "High-Rise Wall Construction 1880-1930." History of Tall Buildings (Council on Tall Buildings and Urban Habitat, Committee 29, Third International Conference on Tall Buildings and Urban Habitat, Chicago, Ill., January 1986), 119–199. ISBN 0-07-012532-5

== Selected articles on Dreicer's work ==
- Hank Burchard. "Raised in a Barn." Washington Post, (8 April 1994).
- Gayle Worland. "Barn Again!." Springfield Illinois Times, (4 April 1994).
- David Montgomery. "One Downright Uplifting Experience." Washington Post, (14 March 1994).
- Benjamin Forgey. "Barn Praising: A Bittersweet Exhibit." Washington Post, (19 March 1994).
- Cathy Lynn Grossman. "Country Icon Finds a Home in the City." USA Today, (23 March 1994).
- Hank Burchard. "Fence Sitting." Washington Post, (7 June 1996).
- Benjamin Forgey. "The Great Walls of America." Washington Post, (1 June 1996).
- Patricia Leigh Brown, "Good Neighbors Make Good Fences." New York Times, (6 June 1996).
- Lynda Richardson. "How Architecture Shapes Segregation." New York Times, (2 December 2000).
- Michael O’Sullivan. "A Lively Look at Living in America." Washington Post, (11 October 2002).
- Jeffery K. Stine. "Me, Myself and Infrastructure: Private Lives and Public Works in America." Technology and Culture, 4 (October 2003): 778–85.
- Peter Stegner. "Me, Myself and Infrastructure." Bauwelt (16 August 2002).
- Colangelo, Lisa L. (October 30, 2005). "Now On Show: How Mayor Ed Koch Led New York City into Better Times". Daily News.
- Fred Siegel. "The Mayor Who Brought the City Back from the Brink." New York Sun (24 October 2005).
- Steven Lubar. "Transformed by Light: The New York Night" at the Museum of the City of New York. Museumblog, September 3, 2006.
- Perform, WNET, SundayArts News, June 15, 2008.
- Kevin Nance. "Learned Folks Wreaking Havoc on Our ‘Built Planet.’" Chicago Sun-Times. (19 August 2007).
- Bill Cunniff. "Beyond Sustainable: Chicago Architecture Foundation Digs Deeper into Green Initiatives." Chicago Sun-Times (6 July 2008 ).
- William Mullen. "A Model City: Chicago Displayed in Miniature." Chicago Tribune (8 June 2009).
- Cheryl Rossi, "The Museum of Vancouver Gets Happy," Vancouver Courier (21 April 2015).
- "Creating the New Vancouver," Vancouver Sun (15 Jan 2016).
- Robert Mangelsdorf, "Imagining Vancouver's Future," Vancouver Courier (27 January 2016).
- Jan Zeschky, "Museum Launches Unbelievable Challenge to Our Culture's Stories," Vancouver Courier (21 June 2017).
- Tara Lee, "Unbelievable, A Provocative Exhibition About Stories, Opens at the Museum of Vancouver," Inside Vancouver (22 June 2017).
- Laura Jones, "The Museum of Vancouver's new exhibit is fittingly called Unbelievable," The Ubyssey (5 July 2017).
