= Murders of Gary Matson and Winfield Mowder =

1999 murder of a gay couple in Redding, California

Gary Matson
- Born: April 6, 1949; California, U.S.
- Died: July 1, 1999 (aged 50); Redding, California, U.S.
- Cause of death: Ballistic trauma
- Known for: Murder victim
- Partner: Winfield Mowder

Winfield Mowder
- Born: May 30, 1959; California, U.S.
- Died: July 1, 1999 (aged 40); Redding, California, U.S.
- Cause of death: Gunshot wounds
- Known for: Murder victim
- Partner: Gary Matson

Gary Matson (April 6, 1949 – July 1, 1999) and Winfield Mowder (May 30, 1959 – July 1, 1999) were a gay couple from Redding, California, who were murdered by white supremacist brothers Benjamin Matthew Williams and James Tyler Williams. The Williams brothers confessed to killing the couple because they were gay.

== Background ==
=== Gary Matson and Winfield Mowder ===
Gary Matson and Winfield Mowder were together as a couple for 14 years. They lived in Happy Valley, California, just outside Redding.

Matson, 50, earned a Master of Science degree in environmental horticulture from UC Davis in 1984. Afterwards, he and Mowder founded Matson Horticulture and Florabundance Nursery in Redding. Matson helped found a community garden to help feed the hungry (called the Redding Farmers Market), the Carter House Natural Science Museum (now Turtle Bay Exploration Park) for children, and the Redding Arboretum.

He was divorced from his wife, Marcia Howe, who was also responsible for the founding of Carter House Natural Science Museum and with whom he had a daughter, Clea.

Mowder, 40, held a Bachelor of Science degree in anthropology and worked part-time as an associate in Orchard Supply Hardware's Garden Department, while also attending California State University, Chico. He frequently spoke at local high schools, serving as a source of knowledge and support for both gay and straight teens.

Together in 1997, Matson and Mowder founded Plantstogo.com, an online nursery specializing in plants for hot climates.

=== The Williams brothers ===
The Williams brothers operated a landscaping and lawn service out of their parents' home in Palo Cedro, California. Neighbors said that the family was known for their fundamentalist Christianity, and that recordings of sermons and religious music were often heard from their house.

Prior to moving to Redding, the Williamses lived in Gridley, a farming community in Butte County, California. According to neighbors, the family kept to themselves. The boys were not allowed to participate in extracurricular activities.

When the family moved to Redding, on what the father (Benjamin Williams) told neighbors were "God's orders", mail from militia groups, addressed to the family, continued to arrive at their home. As children, the brothers attended what is now Bethel Church, in Redding, a Charismatic Christian church.

Benjamin Matthew Williams--commonly known as Matthew--briefly served in the Navy, and was stationed in Bremerton, Washington. While living in Moscow, Idaho, he joined another Charismatic Christian church, Living Faith Fellowship, and became fascinated with white supremacist and antisemitic literature he read on the Internet.

The brothers were found to have called white supremacists Matt Hale and Alex Curtis on the phone prior to the murders.

== The murders ==
On the morning of July 1, Oscar Matson called his son, Gary, and heard a newly recorded outgoing answering machine message saying that they both were ill and were leaving to visit with a "specialist friend" of theirs in San Francisco for a week. Police said the man on the recording sounded distressed and seemed to be feigning illness. Detectives said they believed that the man in the recording was trying to send a message that a close acquaintance had forced him to make the recording.

Another male voice was heard in the background telling the man in the recording to "just calm down." Believing that the male voice did not sound like Matson or Mowder, Roger Matson drove to his brother's home and discovered the bodies. The couple's nude bodies were found in their bed. Shell casings from a .22 caliber gun littered the floor, and the walls and ceiling were stained with blood. There was no sign of forced entry, and no apparent signs of robbery or anything being taken from the house. Matson's Toyota Tercel station wagon was gone, and police recovered it 50 miles south near Yuba City.

Investigators said that, after being forced to make the recording, the couple was forced into their platform bed, which stood seven feet off the floor. The killers then stood on chairs at the foot of the bed and fired at the couple. Matson received five shots to the head and one to the back. Mowder was shot seven times in the head and once in the neck.

== Arrests ==
Matthew and Tyler Williams were arrested after police found Matson's vehicle abandoned at the side of the road near Oroville, California. The brothers were arrested at about 4:30 p.m. on July 7, 1999, as they left a Yuba City shopping mall. Both carried handguns. Matthew wore a bulletproof vest.

Police were alerted by a phone call made two hours after Matson and Mowder were killed, to a company in Scottsdale, Arizona. The caller ordered ammunition and other equipment worth $2,276.09, and asked that the order be sent to a Yuba City private mailbox firm, care of Gary Matson. The order was paid for with Matson's credit card. Detectives traced the address and arrived just as the Williams brothers showed up.

Searches of the brothers' residences yielded literature from white supremacist organizations, including the World Church of the Creator. The World Church of the Creator was a pantheistic white separatist, anti-Christian religion. Investigators examined whether the case was part of a conspiracy of hate-crime violence by members of the World Church of the Creator. The Matson and Mowder murders took place just days before World Church of the Creator associate Benjamin Nathaniel Smith went on a shooting spree targeting racial and ethnic minorities in Illinois and Indiana. Unnamed federal resources were cited as having found a handwritten letter from Matthew Williams to National Alliance leader William Pierce.

In addition, investigators also found .22 caliber shells and 13 lb (5.9 kg) of black powder.

=== Tyler Williams's account ===
After the brothers' arrest, authorities said they believed the brothers were acquainted with Matson and Mowder through their involvement in the local landscaping industry. In a pre-sentencing interview with Shasta County deputy probation officer Gerald Salles, Tyler Williams recounted how he and his brother planned and carried out the murders.

Tyler Williams said he and his brother first talked about killing Matson and Mowder two weeks before the July 1, 1999 shootings, after Matthew Williams told Tyler that he had met Matson and Mowder at the Redding Farmers Market. The couple, like Matthew Williams, had a booth. Ed Smith, who owned a Palo Cedro nursery where Matthew Williams worked for six months, also said Matthew Williams knew Matson and described them as friends.

Tyler Williams said he did not know how his brother decided to single out the couple, but that Matthew told him they were a homosexual couple. Olin Gordon, of Olinda, Shasta County, who had considered hiring the Williams brothers to do some landscaping, said that Matthew Williams had mentioned knowing Matson was homosexual.

According to Tyler, the brothers drove out to Happy Valley late on the night of June 30 or early on July 1, in a Toyota Corolla registered to their father. Matson and Mowder were asleep in their bed. He then said that Matthew Williams did the shooting, emptying a magazine from his .22 caliber semiautomatic handgun before reloading and firing five more shots. Other than labored breathing, Tyler Williams said the victims made no sound before or after the shootings. After the shooting, Matthew Williams drove away in Matson's Toyota Tercel while Tyler Williams returned to his parents' house and went to sleep.

Tyler Williams's account did not include an explanation for the newly recorded outgoing message on the answering machine, which investigators believed the couple had been forced to make, suggesting that they were awake at time of the shooting, and not asleep as Tyler Williams claimed.

== Motive ==
In his account of the murders, Tyler Williams said that his brother did not consider the killing of Matson and Mowder to be murder, but a "judgment" instead.

In November 1999, Matthew Williams began giving interviews to various media outlets. In an interview with The Sacramento Bee, he admitted to the murders and said that when he killed Matson and Mowder he was "obeying the law of God." Williams said that he committed the murders because he believed their homosexuality violated God's laws, and he hoped his actions would incite more killings.

Williams insisted that his actions did not constitute murder and claimed that he expected to receive a fairly light sentence even if found guilty, ignoring the fact that he was on trial for first-degree murder and would face either the death penalty or life in prison without the possibility of parole under California law if convicted. Because the Bible holds that homosexuality is a sin that must be punished by death, he claimed, the responsibility lies with the victims. Williams expressed regret that more "people who claim to be Christians" didn't "have the guts" to act as he had. Admitting the possibility of his future execution, he said he hoped to become a "Christian martyr" whose death would inspire others to lash out against Jews, homosexuals, and other minorities.

=== Matthew Williams's sexuality questioned ===
In interviews with media, two friends from Matthew Williams's past recounted incidents concerning questions about his sexual orientation.

Todd Bethel served in the Navy with Williams, and claimed to have been his best friend during that period. He briefly rented an apartment with Williams when they were both assigned to a ship in Bremerton, Washington. Bethel, who reportedly tried to sell a videotape and photographs of Williams, said that he and others thought Williams acted too "prissy" and "sat too close to other men." Bethel asked Williams if he was gay, and said Williams denied it and seemed disturbed by the idea that he might be perceived as such.

In August 1999 Dan Martin, Williams's best friend from his time in the Living Faith Fellowship, gave an interview to The Advocate, which described their relationship as a romantic friendship. According to Martin, the two shared poetry, skinny-dipped, and traded stories over campfires in the Idaho mountains. When Williams left the church to drift into the white supremacist movement, Martin went on to become a gay rights activist.

According to Martin, shortly before the murders Williams called a mutual friend looking for Martin's home number in Moscow, Idaho. When he was told that Martin identified as openly gay and was coordinator of an HIV prevention group, Williams began to sob uncontrollably. Martin said he thought the revelation may have triggered the murders of Matson and Mowder.

== Aftermath ==
=== Synagogue and clinic arsons ===
During searches of the brothers' homes and storage utilities, authorities also found a "hit list" of prominent Jewish civic leaders in the Sacramento, California area. The list was apparently compiled after the June 18, 1999 arson attacks against three synagogues in Sacramento – Congregation B'nai Israel, Congregation Beth Shalom, and Knesset Israel Torah Center. The fires caused over $1 million in damage.

On March 17, the brothers were charged with setting the three synagogue fires and the July 2 fire at Country Club Medical Center, which housed an abortion clinic. The charges carried of up to 235 years in prison. Matthew Williams later admitted to reporters that he was one of eight or nine men who set fire to the synagogues and the clinic.

=== Arson pleas ===
In September 2001, the brothers pleaded guilty to their 1999 arson attacks against synagogues and clinics. In December 2001, the brothers were sentenced for the arsons—Matthew Williams to 30 years, and Tyler Williams to 21 years—and were ordered to pay more than $1 million in restitution.

=== Advertisement congratulating "Reverend Williams" ===
In June 2000, Matthew Williams's court-appointed attorney paid for an advertisement that appeared in the June 18 edition of The Redding Record Searchlight, congratulating Williams on being ordained as a minister by the Christ's Covenant Church. The two-column-by-four-inch advertisement depicted a dove bearing an olive branch, and was labeled as having been placed by "the family and friends of Benjamin Matthew Williams."

The ad, which appeared on Father's Day, read "Rev. Williams: May your knowledge and faith continue to grow during your current persecutions and trials." William's attorney, Frank J. O'Connor, placed the ad and paid the $107.70 bill to The Redding Record Searchlight. O'Connor and the Williams family refused to comment on the ad. The newspaper said that the advertising representative did not focus on Williams's name when the order was placed, and that the ad would not have been printed had the paper been aware of its content.

=== Matthew Williams's suicide ===
On June 22, 2002, Matthew Williams and another inmate named Paul Smith attacked prison guard Timothy Renault with a homemade hatchet. Renault suffered a skull fracture and a broken jaw. Matthew Williams was kept in a segregation unit following the attack.

At 6:30 a.m. on November 17, 2002, Matthew Williams was found dead in his cell, an apparent suicide. It is believed that he killed himself sometime late the previous night, November 16, or early in the morning on the 17th. Williams jammed his cell door with a piece of cardboard, and then spread a blanket between his cell toilet and the wall, so that he would not be seen by his jailers. He bled to death from multiple self-inflicted slash wounds to his arms, legs, and neck from a disposable jail-issued razor he had modified to expose the blade, attached to a handle fashioned from a ballpoint pen, and fastened to his wrist with dental floss.

Around his neck he wore an amulet fashioned from dental floss and aluminum foil, containing various items, including two Bible verses. Officials did not say which Bible verses the amulet held, but in Williams's cell a Bible was open to Psalms 22 and 23.

He was scheduled to be sentenced on December 2.

After Matthew Williams's suicide, it was reported that the Shasta County jail had been ordered by the court to make sure that Williams had no narcotics in his system, so he could be drug-free for a brain scan his attorneys had arranged. Williams was to be weaned off his medications, but Shasta County jail staff stopped Williams's medication abruptly.

Two days prior to committing suicide, Matthew Williams mailed a signed confession to his brother's attorney, taking full responsibility for the murders of Matson and Mowder. In the one-page letter, Williams wrote that it was an "accepted fact" that he killed Matson and Mowder, whom he referred to as "the 2 perverts." He expressed concern about poisoning a jury against his brother, whose innocence he maintained. Tyler Williams's attorney turned the letter over the court for review on the case. While he later attempted to use this document to dismiss the charges against his client, the court rejected this approach, stating that the "confession" had no legal value and that they would neither dismiss any charges against Tyler nor consider any leniency in a plea bargain as a result of it.

=== Sentence ===
On March 3, 2003, Tyler Williams pleaded guilty to two counts of first-degree murder. Facing a life in prison, Tyler apologized to the families and friends of the gay couple he had murdered, stating in court that "I have repented to the Lamb of God for attempting to take His place of leadership in dealing with the world's evils and in not patiently waiting for His timing." Under a plea agreement that avoided the death penalty, Williams was sentenced to 29 years to life, which he began serving after the completion of his entire 21-year sentence in the synagogue and clinic arsons. Williams may have a parole suitability hearing date in November 2026 (three previous hearing slots expired between 2022 and 2025), which he is eligible for because his sentence doesn't include life imprisonment without the possibility of parole, as well as Williams being more than 50 years old and having served at least 20 years consecutively behind bars.

== See also ==
- Violence against LGBT people
- History of violence against LGBT people in the United States
- Matthew Shepard – American hate crime and murder victim (1976–1998)
- Murder of Blaze Bernstein – 2018 murder in Lake Forest, California, US
