= 2024 Eskişehir stabbing =

2024 mass stabbing in Turkey

- Küçükyetim in his livestream, moments before the attack
- Location: Eskişehir, Turkey
- Date: 12 August 2024; 2 years ago c. 18:22 (TRT)
- Attack type: Mass stabbing, slashing
- Weapons: Camping knife; Combat axe (unused); Pepper spray (unused); Folding knife (unused)
- Deaths: 0
- Injuries: 5
- Perpetrator: Arda Küçükyetim
- Motive: Far-right extremism; Misanthropy; Christchurch mosque shootings copycat crime; Neo-Nazism
- Convictions: Attempted premeditated murder (5 counts); Creating fear and panic among the public through threats
- Sentence: 75 years and 5 months' imprisonment

On 12 August 2024, a mass stabbing attack took place outside Tepebaşı Mosque in Eskişehir, Turkey. The suspect behind the attack was identified as 18-year-old Arda Küçükyetim. The attack was livestreamed on Kick through a camera attached to the suspect's vest.

Five people were stabbed and injured before Küçükyetim was detained by the police. One of the victims was hospitalized in a serious condition, but later recovered. Küçükyetim was tried in Eskişehir's 6th High Criminal Court. He was charged with five counts of attempted premeditated murder and creating public panic.

In September 2025, Küçükyetim was sentenced to 75 years and 5 months of imprisonment. He committed suicide in custody in June 2026.

== Stabbing ==
In the afternoon of 12 August 2024, Arda Küçükyetim formatted all of his devices and arrived at the vicinity of the mosque in the Uluönder neighbourhood of Tepebaşı district. Behind a local barbershop, he put on a helmet, ski mask and tactical vest, then started a livestream. He walked to the tea garden of the mosque, located within Şehit Rüstem Demirbaş Park, where he pulled out a camping knife and slit a man's throat, leaving him in critical condition before attempting to chase down other people. He would go on to attack people at random in the surrounding areas of the mosque, inflicting minor injuries to four more people at Uluönder tram station before getting chased and subdued by a police officer. At the end of the livestream, a policeman was seen taking off his tactical vest as he lay on the ground handcuffed and surrounded by bystanders and police. He was also armed with pepper spray, a folding knife and an axe at his waist that he did not use.

== Victims ==
The victims were identified as Tevfik Arslan (73), Cumali Özemek (57), Naşit Özyürek (89), Metin Korkmaz (66) and Cemal Altıntaş (53). They were treated at Eskişehir City Hospital, Eskişehir Osmangazi University Faculty of Medicine Hospital, and Yunus Emre State Hospital. Özemek was the most heavily-injured one, suffering a slash to his neck. He recovered after eight days' hospitalization.

== Perpetrator ==
Arda Küçükyetim (2006 – 29 June 2026) was a self-described national socialist; prior to the attack he created a Telegram chat where he had a friend share the file containing his manifesto, documents written by perpetrators of previous violent attacks and photos of himself. Küçükyetim claimed in the manifesto that he was motivated by accelerationism, described people as "insects", called for the genocide of Kurds, and praised various white supremacist terrorists and mass murderers, including the perpetrators of the Oklahoma City bombing, 2011 Norway attacks, 2017 Las Vegas shooting, Columbine High School massacre, and Christchurch mosque shootings. The manifesto also contained a warning of an incoming societal collapse and encouraged the reader to help achieve it using violent methods. A Telegram chat in which he posted his manifesto was later found to have also been browsed by Natalie Rupnow, the perpetrator of the Abundant Life Christian School shooting. The Institute for Strategic Dialogue also identified nihilistic violent extremism in his beliefs. Küçükyetim described his attack as a "lone wolf" act that was meant to motivate future generations, stating "What you do will not be forgotten by me or other saints". He had originally intended to target an office of the Communist Party of Turkey, but chose to attack the mosque due to preparation time constraints, also mentioning plans to plant an explosive at an immigration centre. On 29 June 2026, Küçükyetim committed suicide in his prison cell.

== Investigation ==
According to authorities, Küçükyetim had initially planned to carry out a bombing attack but changed his mind due to safety concerns at home. Küçükyetim also confessed to investigators that the driving force behind the attack was his hatred for humanity and not religion. He stated, "I did this because I do not like people and wanted to make a noise". Küçükyetim also claimed that he felt inspired by a 16-year-old from Eastern Europe he had contact with, who shared plans to commit a school shooting in their own country and allegedly encouraged Küçükyetim's plot. Cybercrime investigators were unable to identify this person.

A psychiatric evaluation verified Küçükyetim's criminal responsibility, and an investigation found that he was fully aware of his actions. Prosecutors stated that his acts were ideologically motivated violence but not terrorism. Küçükyetim stated that he had no contact with any terrorist organizations and regretted the attack. He also revealed that he had tried to receive help from a hospital's psychiatric service about seven months prior to the attack in an effort to overcome his depression, but had stopped taking his medication afterward for unknown reasons.

Authorities charged Küçükyetim with five counts of “premeditated attempted murder” and “creating fear and panic among the public”. The prosecution sought a maximum sentence of 108 years imprisonment (20 for each attempted murder, 8 for creating fear and panic). The Eskişehir court imposed a ban on media coverage of the event until the investigation was completed. A 17-year-old high school student was alleged to have been involved in the incident, though due to his status as a minor his charges were not made known and he was not put in custody. One page of Küçükyetim‘s manifesto included an image of the two Columbine perpetrators in the school cafeteria.

In September 2024, two white supremacists from the United States, Dallas Humber and Matthew Allison, were arrested in connection with encouraging the attack. The two were members of Terrorgram. They were charged with soliciting hate crimes and the murder of federal officials, distributing bomb-making instructions and conspiring to provide material support to terrorists, as they had shared writing material with Küçükyetim and encouraged him to carry out his crime. Among the files shared between the three were writings by Juraj Krajcík, the perpetrator of the 2022 Bratislava shooting. Despite this, the incident was not treated as a terrorist incident by the Turkish government, as there has been no conclusive link made to any organized terrorist militia.

Küçükyetim's trial began on 7 March 2025. During his opening statement, he claimed that at the time of the crime, he had difficulty distinguishing between fiction and reality, and thought he was inside a video game.

On 24 September 2025, Küçükyetim was sentenced to 75 years and 5 months imprisonment, broken into four separate 15-year sentences for attempted murder, one sentence of 11 years and 8 months for the fifth charge, and 3 years and 9 months for creating fear and panic among the public.

After Küçükyetim's suicide, an autopsy was conducted, after which an investigation regarding the death was ordered.

== See also ==
- List of mass stabbing incidents (2020–present)
- Right-wing terrorism
- Livestreamed crime
- Terrorgram
