= Alex Curtis =

American former white supremacist (born 1975)

- Born: Alexander James Curtis; 1975 (age 50–51); Point Loma, San Diego, California, U.S.
- Other name: Ax Curtis
- Conviction: Conspiracy to violate civil rights (three counts)
- Penalty: 3 years in prison

Alexander James Curtis (born 1975) is an American former white supremacist and neo-Nazi. He was one of the white supremacist movement's earliest popular internet figures and ran a magazine called the Nationalist Observer out of San Diego, California. He is most well-known for, with Tom Metzger, popularizing the term "lone wolf" in reference to terrorism. He promoted antisemitism and white separatism and celebrated right-wing terrorists, including murderers Timothy McVeigh and Eric Rudolph. Curtis also advocated lone wolf terror acts, including assassinations, and gave tips on how to commit violence, including bioterrorism.

In 1998, the San Diego Police Department and the Federal Bureau of Investigation began a joint investigation of Curtis entitled Operation Lone Wolf as an investigation of his potential criminal activities. The FBI investigation cemented the term "lone wolf terrorism" as the popular term for what Curtis advocated. Curtis acted with other racist activists to harass several San Diego figures he opposed, among them Art Madrid and Bob Filner. In November 2000, shortly after a report by the Anti-Defamation League, Curtis was arrested and charged federally with three counts of having a conspiracy to commit civil rights violations. Three of his followers were also charged. Curtis pleaded guilty in March of the next year, and in June was ultimately only sentenced to three years in prison after an agreement to stop affiliating with racist causes. His websites ceased functioning due to his imprisonment. Curtis ceased being involved in the white supremacist movement after his release.

== Early life ==
Alexander James Curtis was born in Point Loma, San Diego, California, U.S. in 1975. His father owned an engineering business. Curtis was a Presbyterian, and was for some time homeschooled by his parents. His parents agreed with his views to some extent; his father later gave him material for his magazine, and his mother defended him as "divinely inspired". He was raised and lived in Lemon Grove, California. According to an autobiography that he emailed out to his followers, he became racist at the age of 13 after a "self-education" process, after he had become racist against Mexicans while attending Lemon Grove Middle School.

At Helix High School, where he was an honors student, he read Mein Kampf at the school as a freshman. At the age of 17, Curtis wrote in a diary (later confiscated by police) that his life plan was to "rid the Earth of the unwanted un-Aryan elements, by whatever means necessary and possible." He started what he claimed was a chapter of the Ku Klux Klan about this time, of which he was the only member, and referred to himself as an "Exalted Cyclops". He burglarized the school twice, stealing lists of students' home addresses so he could write racist letters to their parents. He was arrested for the burglaries and for vandalizing his school's classrooms with racist terms and swastikas. He was also held on suspicion of sending a death threat to a police officer and sending threats to local newspapers. He was convicted, but since he was a minor, he only received probation and community service. He was expelled.

== White supremacy ==
An academic article in 2012 retrospectively described Curtis as "one of the [white supremacist] movement's early Internet celebrities"; while a contemporary writer for ZDNET called him "arguably [...] the most incendiary voice in the White-supremacy subculture". After he left high school, he spent several years attending right-wing political meetings before he decided this was useless, and shifted to committing what he termed "small-time terrorist acts". He became a prolific creator of local racist fliers. His fliers featured police insignias and phone numbers, a crime when used improperly; Curtis was arrested in August 1997 and convicted of improperly using police materials. He pleaded guilty and was sentenced to three years of probation and 100 hours of community service.

In 1996, he created a monthly magazine and website, the Nationalist Observer. He moved from real life to largely online activism in 1997. He had a wide array of connections online through which he spread his ideas; he was known for, unlike many other white supremacists, preaching "unity" among the many different factions of the movement, many of which constantly feuded with each other. Curtis affiliated with several other white supremacists, among them Richard Butler, Matt Hale, Vincent Bertollini, and Tom Metzger, and was in contact with several imprisoned white supremacists, including murderers and members of The Order. He operated out of San Diego, and still lived with his parents at the time.

He was antisemitic, anti-black, and advocated white separatism or extermination of those who are not white. He accused other racists of "soft-pedal[ling]" their racism. A self declared National Socialist, he professed an admiration for Adolf Hitler and other Nazis. He was not a Holocaust denier but said rather that he did not care, and called Holocaust denial a distraction. He believed in antisemitic conspiracies that Jewish people are engaged in a scheme to corrupt society and "overthrow White cultural traditions and destroy the White Race". Curtis argued against authority and "all law enforcement and elections"; Curtis believed the U.S. government to be "the worst enemy of the Aryan race", and said that white supremacists must "never turn against any enemy of the United States government, foreign or domestic". Curtis, while not a member of the White Order of Thule (WOT), was a fan of their publication Crossing the Abyss, which he called "easily the best publication in the movement in terms of contents and presentation". The WOT founder Peter Georgacarakos criticized the Nationalist Observer, however, and Curtis and Nathan Pett, another WOT affiliate, had a falling out. He supported hate crime laws because he believed their being selectively enforced against whites would radicalize them and give white supremacists an excuse for their hatred and violence. He supported Metzger's "worse is better" philosophy; he advocated making other ethnic groups hate white people to further the amount of hatred in the world.

Curtis also ran a separate website, the Weekly Racist Message, and a series of telephone broadcasts, "Weekly Racist Broadcasts". The "Weekly Racist Message" offered by the website was available in text and in audio form using RealPlayer. Curtis's email updates went out to about 800 subscribers at the time. He also ran a web forum, the "Racial Reader's Forum", which other white supremacists would advertise on. His home was raided by the police on several occasions. In 2000, he created an internet guide for the National Observer entitled "Biology for Aryans" that advocated and explained the usage of bioterrorism agents, including typhoid, botulism, and anthrax. Other issues of the publication included a "security issue" that told readers how to avoid getting caught. He funded his operations through a mail-order catalogue of racist items.

=== Lone wolf terrorism ===
Curtis proclaimed himself the "Lone Wolf of Hate". In addition to fellow white supremacist Tom Metzger, in the 1990s Curtis promoted the tactic of and the term lone wolf in reference to terrorism, "lone wolf activism". The idea as promoted by Metzger and Curtis was an extension of the leaderless resistance idea of Louis Beam. Academic Jason-Leigh Striegher wrote that both men had "essentially coined the term 'lone wolf'" in this manner. At the time, extremist right-wing groups were being heavily infiltrated by outsiders, hampering their activities. Any groups that suggested violent action were regularly the target of lawsuits for vicarious liability in the event that any occurred, for inciting the violent acts. Hence, Curtis advocated entirely individual action with no tie to any group, believing that this would not implicate other people or groups in the movement. Formal group meetings were advised against. Acting in small cells was also deemed acceptable. Curtis advised such individuals to refuse cooperation with authorities and only say the "five words": "I have nothing to say".

Believing all ends justified the means, he advocated a variety of tactics, including assassination, the individual targeting of non-white people and federal agents, and debated the efficacy of selling crack cocaine to advance the racist cause. Curtis created a "Lone Wolf Point System" to reward those individuals who did so, and had on his website a list of figures he suggested they assassinate (itself copied from Louis Beam's book Essays of a Klansman). He celebrated racists that committed attacks, arguing that far-right activists should never condemn them. He was one of the few radical right figures (as was Metzger) to openly praise Timothy McVeigh, the perpetrator of the 1995 Oklahoma City bombing; Curtis declared McVeigh the "lone wolf of the century" and said that he had "accomplished more than every racist group has since WW2". In an "Advice for Lone Wolves" issue, he advised one to live an antisocial lifestyle with modest possessions, never cooperate with law enforcement (prison suicide being deemed more preferable). Curtis encouraged those who read his website to support incarcerated racist murderers.

In August 1999, white supremacist Buford O. Furrow committed a mass shooting at a Jewish community center, killing one person and injuring five, including several children. Reception in the white supremacist movement to the attack was mixed, but Curtis celebrated the attack. He declared Furrow the "Aryan of the Month", and criticized the white supremacists who criticized Furrow for targeting innocents, saying to them, "What kind of fucking anti-Semite are you to ever say any Jew is innocent?". Later that year, he also praised Benjamin Smith, the perpetrator of the 1999 Independence Day weekend shootings, who killed several before killing himself; another focus was Eric Rudolph. In 1999, white supremacists Matthew and Tyler Williams, who killed a gay couple and firebombed several synagogues, were found to have called Curtis on the phone prior to their crimes. He was critical of some racially motivated crimes, not for moral reasons, but for being committed in ways he considered insufficiently effective. His website listed and reviewed acts of right-wing violence, where he would give the reader tips on how to avoid the perpetrator's mistakes in committing the crime.

He conceived of the white supremacist movement having a propaganda wing to encourage lone actors, while the lone actors would actually commit the attacks with no formal connection to them. Both Metzger and Curtis saw the lone wolf method as having benefits over other kinds of terrorist action in that it was harder to get caught and had better odds than alternative methods. They both believed it to not be the ideal permanent strategy for white supremacism, but the then most viable method; when society broke down completely, they believed, a more organized resistance would be allowed to form. He wanted lone wolf action to provoke a crisis in a society that would result in racial polarization, societal instability, and revolution.

== Investigations and legal proceedings ==
In 1998, the San Diego Police Department and the Federal Bureau of Investigation began a joint investigation of Curtis and potential criminal activities entitled Operation Lone Wolf, with the "Lone Wolf Task Force". The name was based on Curtis's encouragement of violent "lone wolf" action and his own terminology. In 2000, the Southern Poverty Law Center named Curtis as one of the rising racist activists of the time. In November 2000, the Anti-Defamation League wrote a report profiling Curtis, entitled "Alex Curtis: Lone Wolf of Hate Prowls the Internet". They called him "a rising star among bigots". Both groups regarded him as the most radical white supremacist activist of the time.

From 1997 to 2000, Curtis acted with other racist activists to harass several San Diego figures, among them the neighbor of neighboring La Mesa, Art Madrid, the congressman Bob Filner, a civil rights official, and the San Diego regional ADL director Morris Casuto. Among his crimes were the spray-painting of antisemitic graffiti on two synagogues, placing a snakeskin in the mail slot of Bob Filner, and placing racist stickers and an (inactive) grenade outside of Madrid's home. A week after the ADL report in November 2001 Curtis was arrested as a result of Operation Lone Wolf. The government stated he had led a three year harassment campaign. Three of his followers were also arrested and charged; Curtis had met them through his online activity. Curtis was charged with three federal counts of fomenting a conspiracy to violate civil rights. For this crime he could have served up to, per each count, a US$250,000 (equivalent to $454,567 in 2025) fine and 10 years in prison. He initially pleaded not guilty. Authorities claimed that the group was making more violent plans, including discussing killing a civil rights activist.

White supremacist Rocky Suhayda solicited funds for Curtis's defense. Metzger appeared in support of him in court, as did his father, though Metzger criticized him in court for failing to adhere to his own advice. Curtis pleaded guilty in March of the next year after reaching an agreement with the prosecutors that they would recommend he serve a sentence of three years or less. As part of the plea deal, Curtis agreed to apologize privately and publicly to the victims, which he did in April 2001, though he did not apologize for his beliefs. Also as part of the plea deal he agreed to cease being a white supremacist activist for three years of probation. Curtis was sentenced in June 2001 to three years in prison. Metzger expressed disappointment after his guilty plea. He would also be subject to five years of random searches after his release and three years of probation, and was forbidden to associate with a list of 138 white supremacists. Two of his followers pleaded guilty and were sentenced to 21 and 18 months in prison.

== Aftermath ==
Following his arrest, his websites eventually ceased functioning due to his absence, though some of his articles were later republished by a website run by the white supremacist Creativity movement. Curtis's "five words" were used by white supremacists even several years after his arrest. As a result of the FBI investigation's name, the "lone wolf" terminology became established in referring to lone wolf terrorism. Most of the victims did not believe he was genuine in his apology; Art Madrid said he did not believe Curtis's apology and called him a "racist devil" but said that he also saw him as a victim of his parents. After completing his sentence, Curtis ceased his involvement in the white supremacist movement.

Academics Turchie and Puckett utilized Curtis's lone wolf manual to create a typology of a lone wolf. They argued that the lone wolf as Curtis presented it was "more fable than fact", given the unlikeliness and difficulty of anyone being willing to live out his suggested lifestyle; rather, they suggested any actual "lone wolves" were unlikely to act on someone else's order but have a more personal motivation. Mark Pitcavage noted him as "a major proponent of lone wolf terrorism in the late 1990s".

Scholar Mattias Gardell recalled him as a "cyberwarrior" that "tirelessly sought to promulgate lone-wolfism and violent direct action to his Internet milieu of Aryan activists". Scholar George Michael noted Curtis as then "the most vociferous advocate of the lone wolf approach" and described him along with Matt Hale as some of "the more audacious" white supremacist activists of the time. Michael noted his prosecution as "a return to a more proactive approach by the government to right-wing extremism", which he said increased further after the September 11 attacks. He argued that on its face the crimes Curtis had actually been convicted of "were amateurish and should probably have been handled by local authorities", but that despite this they took him seriously.

== See also ==
- Terrorgram
- Poway synagogue shooting
