= Art Madrid =

American politician (1934–2025)

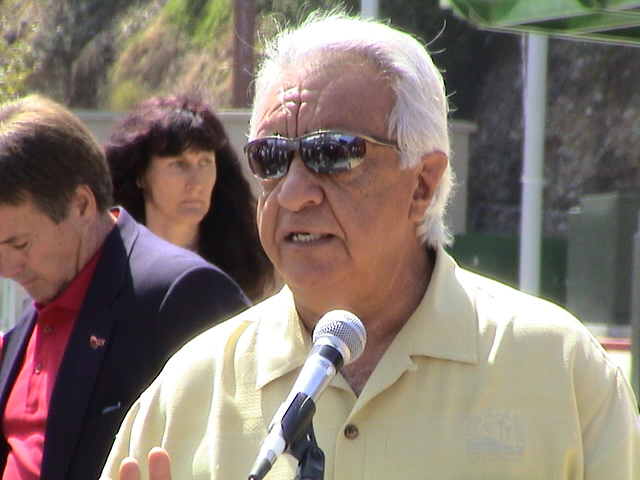
Madrid in 2005

Art Madrid (August 25, 1934 – June 6, 2025) was an American politician who was the mayor of La Mesa, California, from 1990 to 2014.

== Background ==
Madrid was born in New Mexico on August 25, 1934, and moved to La Mesa as a teenager. He served in the United States Marine Corps and later worked for Pacific Bell.

== Political career ==
Madrid became active in politics working for Pete Wilson during Wilson's time as mayor of San Diego. Elected as a City Councilman from 1981 to 1990, Madrid was then elected Mayor of La Mesa, California in 1990 and then re-elected in 1994, 1998, 2002, 2006 and 2010. In 1993, the Los Angeles Times said that Madrid was "San Diego County's most prominent Latino elected official" at that point. After 24 years as mayor, he was defeated by Mark Arapostathis in the November 2014 election.

In 1994, mayor Madrid gained national and international attention when he started a program of publishing the names and pictures of individuals arrested for prostitution in his community.

In 1995, the American Society of Public Administrators selected Art as San Diego County's Outstanding Elected Official. San Diego Magazine selected him as one of their "50 People to watch in 2000."

Madrid served as chair of the San Diego Association of Governments, SANDAG. He also served on the State Board of the League of California Cities and was President of the San Diego Division of the League. He served as President of the California Council of Governments (CALCOG).

In the 1990s, white supremacist activist Alex Curtis placed an (inactive) grenade in front of Madrid's house. For this and other crimes, Curtis was sentenced in 2001 to three years in prison.

== Personal life and death ==
Madrid and his wife, Sally Lee Madrid, had four children. His wife died from cancer in 2003, fifteen years after one of their sons died, also from cancer.

Madrid died at his home in La Mesa, on June 6, 2025, at the age of 90.
