= Dallas Humber =

American white supremacist

- Born: 1989 or 1990 (35–36) (Note: 35 years old on December 17, 2025, and 34 years old on September 9, 2024.); Elk Grove, California
- Other names: Lil' Miss Gorehound; Lolita of the Far Right; Lil' Lolita; hopelessfangirl
- Education: Laguna Creek High School
- Organization: Terrorgram
- Status: 30 years in prison
- Convictions: Soliciting hate crimes; Soliciting terrorist attacks; Soliciting assassinations of federal officials

Dallas Humber, also known by several online pseudonyms such as Lil' Miss Gorehound, Lolita of the Far Right, and hopelessfangirl, is an American white supremacist, propagandist, and neo-Nazi. She is known for being a significant figure in the Terrorgram collective from 2022 to 2024, soliciting terrorist attacks, and providing material to support these attacks such as instructions to make bombs and a list of potential targets. In December 2025, she pleaded guilty to soliciting hate crimes, terrorist attacks, and the assassinations of federal officials, and was sentenced to 30 years in prison.

== Early life ==
Humber is from Elk Grove, California, and attended Laguna Creek High School. In 2003, when she was fourteen years old, she created an account on LiveJournal under the name "pretty_dictator", where she posted about her neo-Nazi ideology, calling herself "a fascist dictator in training" and "a white girl with a dream". She also maintained an account on DeviantArt under the name "hopelessfangirl" where she posted anime-influenced fan art of Nazi figures such as Josef Mengele. In 2010, police raided her home and her boyfriend was arrested and convicted for possession of child sexual abuse material. In 2012 she was arrested for possession of methamphetamine and sentenced to a drug diversion program.

She created a new account on DeviantArt called "Lil' Miss Gorehound" in 2015. On this account, she posted more anime-inspired Nazi art as well as ero guro, a genre of pornography with an emphasis on blood and gore. She also wrote and illustrated a webcomic about two Schutzstaffel officers having bloody sex and murdering prisoners at Nazi death camps. She also posted art to her Instagram account, "einsatz.kdo.5b". At different points in her life, she has made money through academic tutoring, selling art, and reviewing and selling dildos.

== Terrorgram ==
The logo of the Terrorgram collective

In 2019, Humber announced on Instagram that she had created a channel on the software Telegram to post her art under the account "MissGorehoundArt". She also ran multiple other accounts. During this time, she wrote letters to Dylann Roof in prison, and he commissioned an illustration of a wizard from her. She also wrote letters to Brenton Tarrant and Anders Brevik. She became associated with Terrorgram, a network of far-right Telegram channels that promotes and coordinates militant accelerationism and terrorism. She posted videos in which she narrated about white supremacist terrorism, including a video detailing the crimes of 105 white supremacists between 1968 and 2022. Within the Terrorgram community, those that commit acts of terrorism and kill minorities are referred to as "Saints", and she frequently invoked the memories of these "Saints" and encouraged others to copy their crimes. She also narrated audiobook versions of various fascist manifestos encouraging acts of terror, including the manifesto of Brandon Russell and Sarah Clendaniel.

Humber became a leader of the Terrorgram collective in 2022 after its previous leader was arrested on terrorism charges. She, alongside fellow Terrorgram propagandist Matthew Alison, maintained a list of potential assassination targets (such as American judges, politicians, and officials) and provided instructions to create napalm, thermite, chlorine gas, pipe bombs, and dirty bombs. Humber directly incited multiple international attacks, including the 2022 Bratislava shooting, the 2024 Eskişehir stabbing, and the Aracruz school shootings.

On September 9, 2024, the United States Department of Justice announced the arrests of Humber and Alison on 15 felony charges, including soliciting hate crimes, soliciting the murder of federal officials, and conspiring to provide material support to terrorists. Following her arrest, Humber told one of her Terrorgram groups that a federal informant may have infiltrated it. Humber accepted a plea bargain on December 5, 2025, pleading guilty to her charges and being sentenced to 30 years in prison.
