= Rocky Suhayda =

American neo-Nazi (born 1952)

Chairman of the American Nazi Party
- In office 1999–2022
- Succeeded by: Axl Hess
- Preceded by: Office established

Personal details
- Born: Rocky Joe Suhayda; 1952 (age 73–74) Detroit, Michigan, U.S.
- Children: 3

Rocky Joe Suhayda (born 1952) is an American neo-Nazi and far-right activist, who was chairman of an organization called the American Nazi Party, based in Michigan. Suhayda's American Nazi Party is not the same organization as the original American Nazi Party, founded by George Lincoln Rockwell. Suhayda led the organization from at least 1999 until the early 2020s, when he was succeeded by Axl Hess.

== Early life ==
Suhayda was born in 1952 in Detroit, Michigan. Suhayda graduated from Bentley High School in Livonia, Michigan, in 1969. He worked in the shipping and receiving department of the Garden City Osteopathic Hospital. Suhayda has run unsuccessfully for public office on several occasions, including for the Livonia School District and the Livonia City Council. He has three children.

== Neo-Nazism ==
Suhayda was a member of the American Nazi Party, the World Union of Free Enterprise National Socialists and the National Association for the Advancement of White People, and subsequently founded his own organization under the name of the American Nazi Party. Suhayda's organization claims a connection to the American Nazi Party founded by George Lincoln Rockwell in 1959, but it is officially a separate entity. He and his group are based in Michigan. They operate a website. He held the office from at least 1999 until 2022. As of January 2022, the American Nazi Party's website named him as chairman, updated by February 2022 to list as chairman Axl Hess. Hess was previously the group's spokesman.

Suhayda formerly ran the European American Education Association. He was a member of the National White People's Party in 1976, but resigned some point before 1979. From 1979 until the 1980s, he was the Chairman of a 12-member group called The National Front. Suhayda has stated that he represents a Livonia chapter of the Ku Klux Klan. On September 10, 1989, he held a "White Vigil", which he said was to "honor all of our comrades who have died for our cause and who face living death"; it was in an effort to unify white power groups. Members from six groups attended. In 1990, a meeting of the Michigan White Unity Coalition was held in his home.

Following white supremacist activist Alex Curtis being indicted in 2000, Suhayda appealed for legal donations for Curtis. Shortly after the September 11 attacks, Suhayda stated that "if we were one-tenth as serious as the bin Laden terrorists, we just might start getting somewhere", and that the hijackers had "put our great White Movement to SHAME". During the 2008 United States presidential election, he stated that he preferred Barack Obama, despite him being black, saying that: "White people are faced with either a negro or a total nutter who happens to have a pale face. Personally, I’d prefer the negro." His ANP allows non-White or Jewish "supporters". In 2016, Suhayda stated on his radio show that a Donald Trump presidency could give American Nazis the chance to build a 'pro-white' political caucus similar to the Congressional Black Caucus. He publicly supported the appointment of Steve Bannon to the position of chief strategist in Donald Trump's White House.
