= White Resistance Manual =

White supremacist handbook

- Author: Axl Hess (as Aquilifer)
- Language: English
- Publisher: Self-published online
- Publication date: Late 90s or early 2000s
- Pages: 310

The White Resistance Manual is a white supremacist handbook written by Axl Hess under the pseudonym Aquilifer. It was published anonymously online in the late 90s or early 2000s. It is an instruction manual on how to perform activities such as weapon and poison-making, as well as guerrilla warfare, in addition to tips on how to avoid criminal investigation and ideological goals for the white supremacist movement. Possession of the manual is illegal in the United Kingdom, and several individuals have been jailed for possessing it.

== Contents ==
The document is 310 pages long, 302 of which deal with tactical issues. It goes over the goals the movement should promote, and recommends certain targets (e.g. Jews, "anti-White" politicians, "race traitors", among others). The four goals of the movement as he expressed them were to 1) exacerbate racial conflict to the point of "open warfare", 2) "smash Jewish power" both nationally and worldwide, 3) "destroy the legitimacy of current government" and offer a replacement, 4) punish whites viewed as "treasonous" to their people.

It has instructions on how to perform activities such as bomb-making, poison-making, arson, and violent guerrilla warfare against the government. Other topics include construction of firearms, sabotage, particularly against power systems, other infrastructure targets, and non-violent methods of harassment of targets. It advocates what Hess calls "selective assassination" or targeted assassinations. It also advises on how to avoid criminal investigation.

It is similar to the Lone Mujahid Guide, a shorter manual on similar subject matter published by al-Qaeda. Terrorism researcher Ely Karmon described the White Resistance Manual as "a long and detailed document"; relative to other manuals of this kind, it was noted by the Southern Poverty Law Center as especially comprehensive, prompting alarm.

== History and distribution ==
It was written by white supremacist Axl Hess, under the pseudonym Aquilifer. It was published online in the late 90s or early 2000s. It was distributed online by Blood & Honour and Combat 18, as well as other far-right websites. Hess later became the leader of Rocky Suhayda's American Nazi Party (not to be confused with the original American Nazi Party), after becoming its spokesman. He ran a neo-Nazi website called White Honor. Included on this website were speeches from Adolf Hitler, quotes from Oklahoma City bombing perpetrator Timothy McVeigh, and a proclamation that he had "created this website with the intent of providing White Racists with information on what we can do to effectively secure the existence of our people".

American anarchist activist Sherman Austin (who was then arrested for distributing information useful for committing a terrorist attack) said of the work: "There’s something on the Internet called the White Resistance Manual. It’s pretty much for white supremacists … to carry out a large-scale guerilla campaign through means of assassination, threats, obtaining funds through fraud, everything from firearms to explosives. I’ve seen, not surprisingly, no action taken against those people, but here I am, an anarchist website, not even close to what that is, not even close to what else you can find on the Internet."

The manual was connected to a 2011 plot to kill police officers in the United States. Possession of the manual is illegal in the United Kingdom, and several individuals have been jailed for possessing it, for up to 13 years in one case. It has also been found in the possession of jihadists. In 2019, the manual began resurfacing on far-right communities online. It is one of many far-right manuals used for disseminating these concepts and tactical ideas.

== See also ==
- Terrorgram
- The Turner Diaries
- The Anarchist Cookbook
