= McConnell Arboretum & Botanical Gardens =

Park in Redding, California

Coordinates: 40.594°N 122.382°W

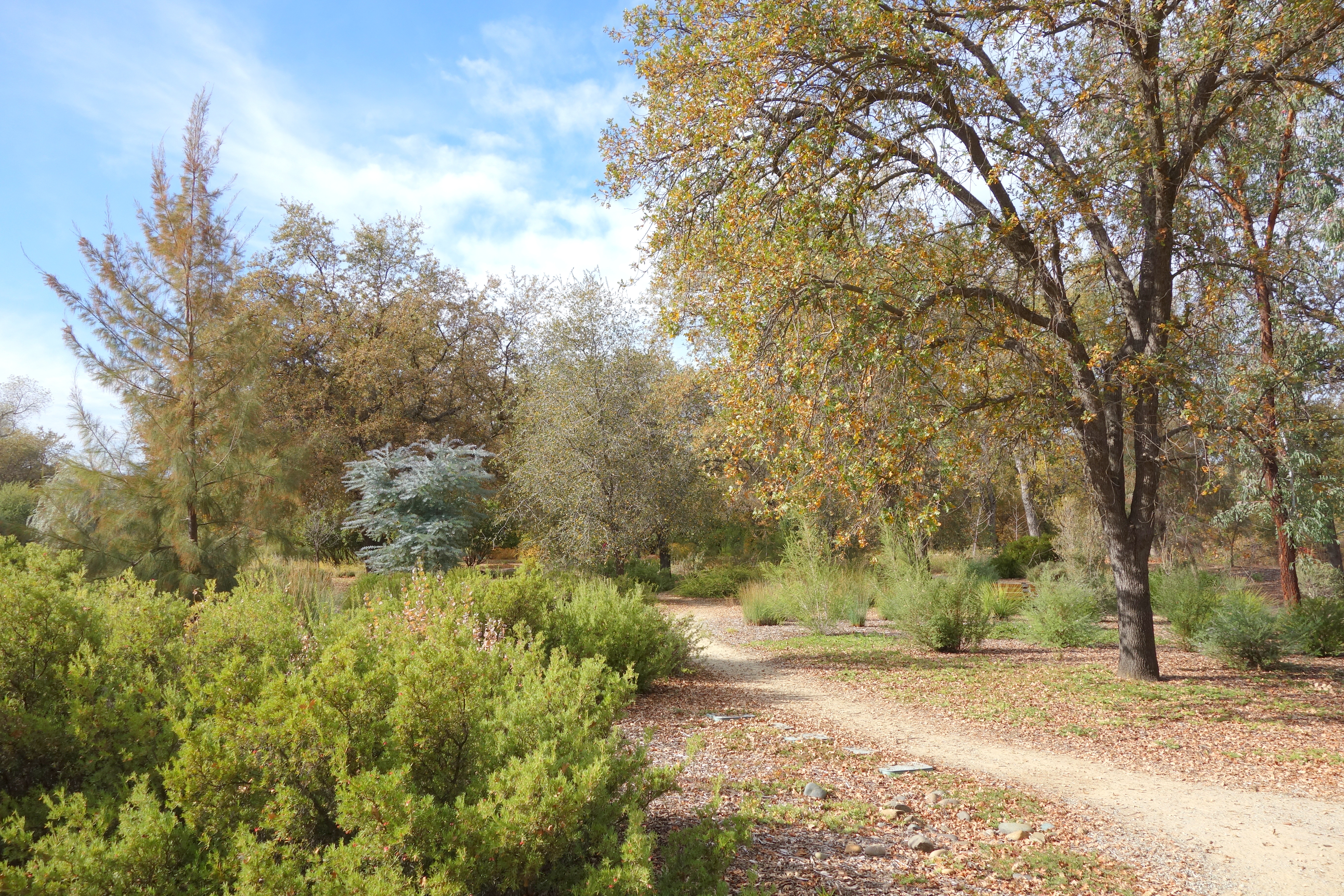
McConnell Arboretum & Botanical Gardens

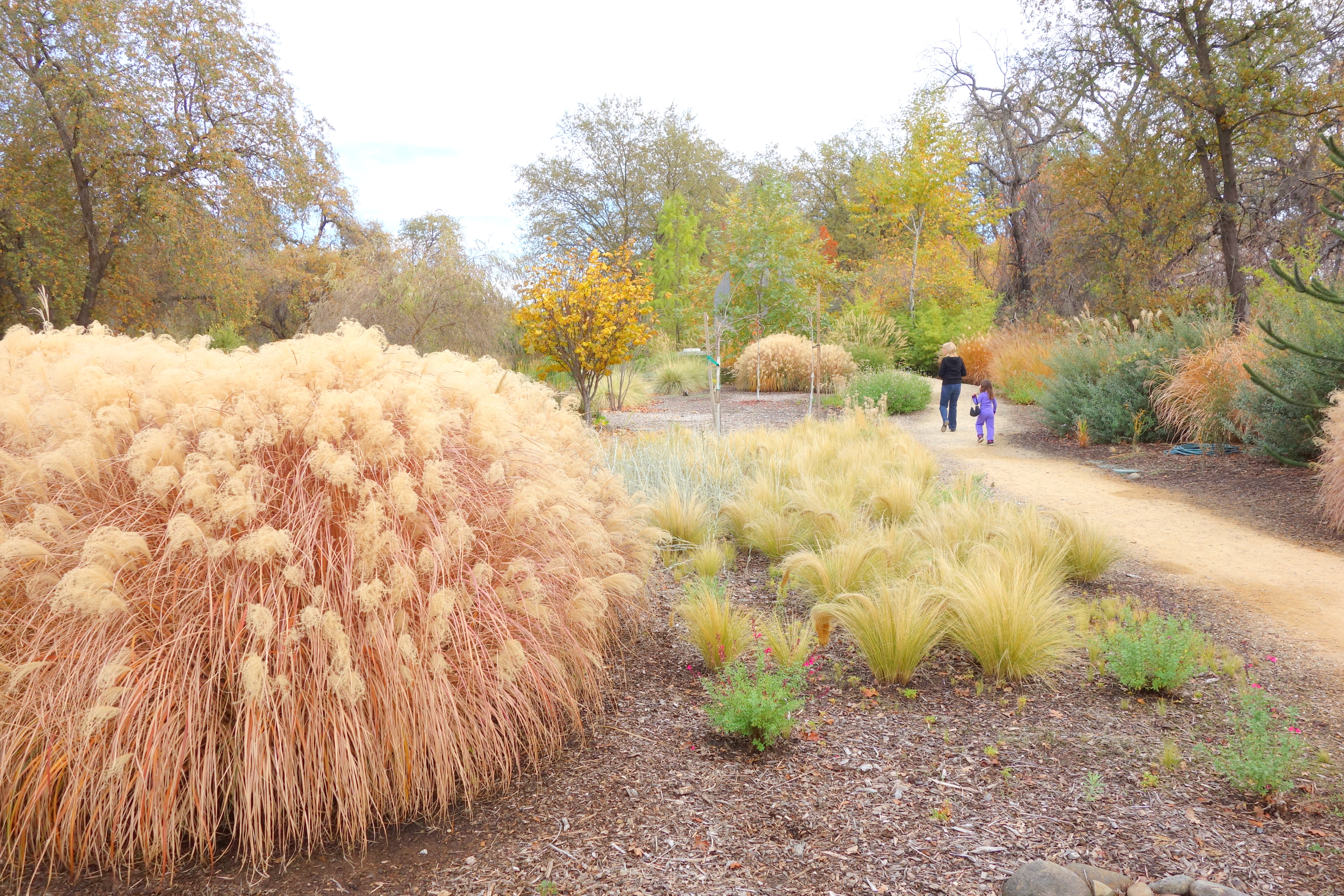
Grass specimens in the gardens

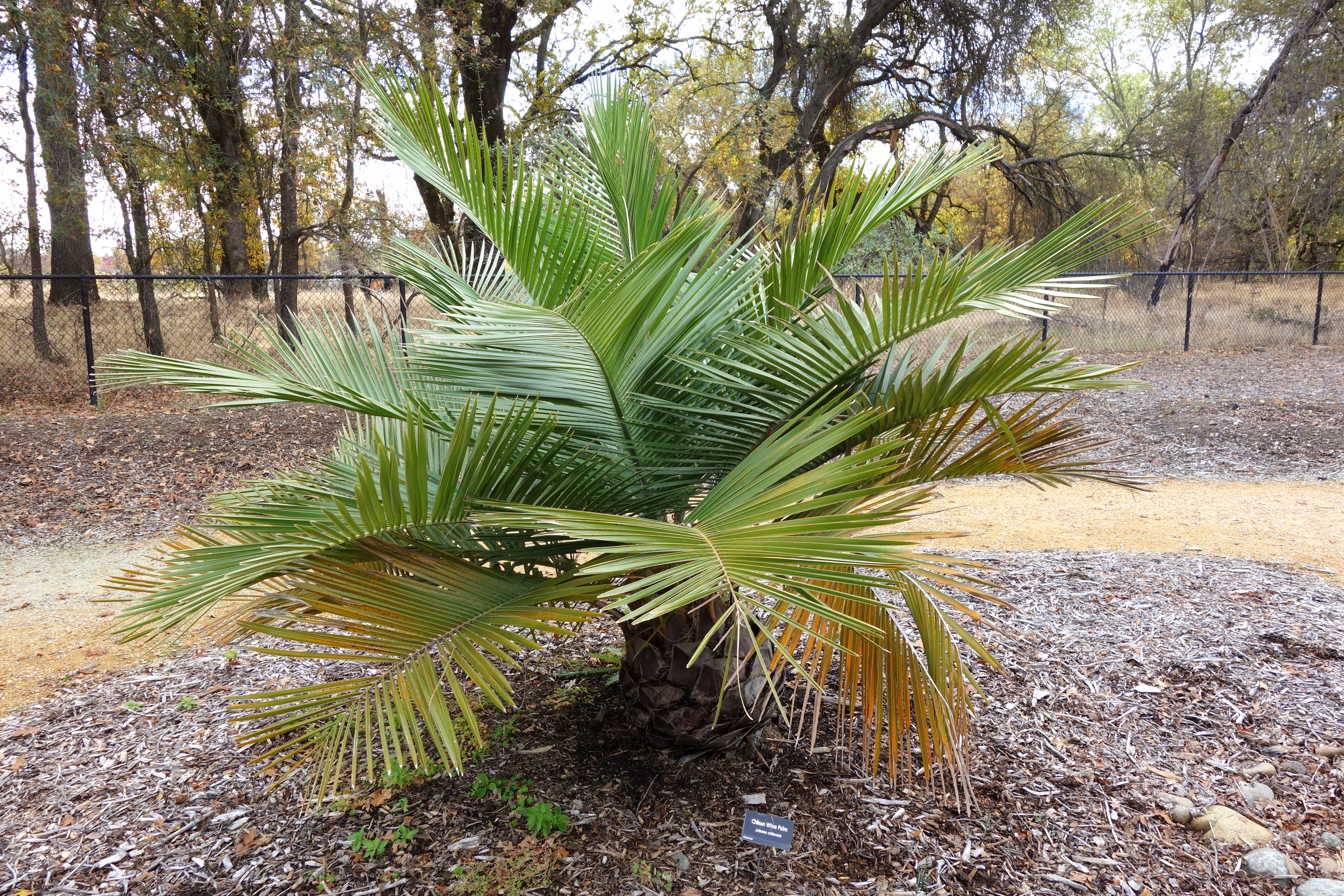
Jubaea chilensis specimen

The McConnell Arboretum & Botanical Gardens, also known as the Redding Arboretum, are located within Turtle Bay Exploration Park, in Redding, California. The gardens opened on May 30, 2005, and cover 300 acres (120 hectares), including 200 acres (80 hectares) of undeveloped arboretum and 20 acres (8 hectares) of botanical garden that span the Sacramento River.

The gardens began in the mid-1980s when three Redding museums began talks to construct a museum complex on 60 acres (24 hectares), and gradually took shape through the mid-1990s. The McConnell Arboretum & Gardens opened in 2005, and currently consist of 20 acres (8 hectares) of gardens and 200 acres (80 hectares) of arboretum, with views of Shasta valley mountains to the west, the Sundial Bridge at Turtle Bay to the east, and the environment along the banks of the Sacramento River, with valley oaks and native vegetation. Turtle Bay Exploration Park is now restoring an additional 340 acres (140 hectares) of riparian habitat located on both sides of the Sacramento River, removing invasive species and re-establishing native vegetation in woodland, grasslands, seasonal wetlands, and valley oak groves.

Principal gardens include the Mediterranean Climate Gardens (Mediterranean Basin, South Africa, Chile, southern and western Australia, and California west of the Sierra Nevada), and other gardens including a children's garden, butterfly garden, and specialty gardens.

- California Garden - Shasta County native plants.
- South African Garden - many commonly grown geophytes (bulbs, tubers, etc.), such as gladiolus.
- Pacific Rim Garden - plants from around the Pacific Ocean.
- Australian Garden - a large collection of trees, shrubs, perennials, and groundcovers from southern and western Australia.
- Chilean Garden - a selection of plants from Chile.
- Medicinal Garden - Ten small planting beds representative of species used in herbal cures.
- Mediterranean Basin Garden - varieties of lavender, rosemary, rockrose, yarrow, etc.
- Carl & Leah's Meadow - wildflowers, including lavender, rosemary, rockrose, and yarrow.
- Butterfly Garden - both nectar and host plants for butterflies.
- Children's Garden - a water feature that includes a drinking fountain, ornamental fountain, and play structure designed by artist Colleen Barry.
- Arboretum - 200 acres (80 hectares) of undeveloped riparian forest and oak savanna, now being restored with native species.
