= Laguna Creek High School =

High School in Elk Grove, Sacramento County, California, United States

Coordinates: 38°25′43.31″N 121°25′45.60″W

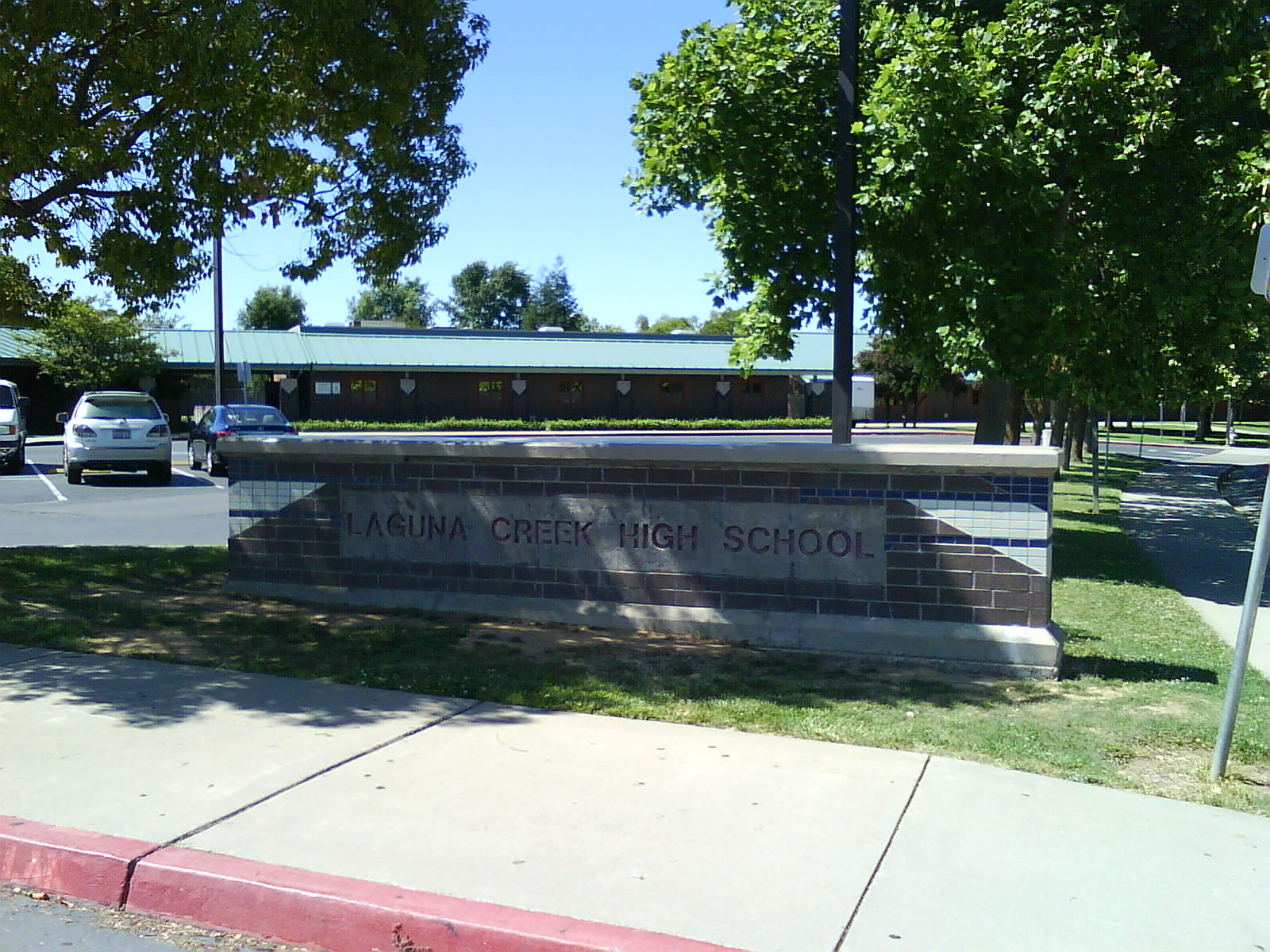

Location
- 9050 Vicino Drive; Elk Grove, Sacramento County, California 95758; United States

Information
- School type: Public
- Established: 1994
- School board: Elk Grove Board of Education
- School district: Elk Grove Unified School District
- Superintendent: Chris Hoffman
- Area trustee: Gina Jamerson
- Principal: Mark Benson
- Student to teacher ratio: 21.49
- Campus type: Closed campus
- Colors: Cardinal, black, and white
- Fight song: "On Wisconsin"
- Mascot: Cardinal
- Rival: Valley High School
- Feeder schools: Harriet G. Eddy Middle School
- Website: Official website

Laguna Creek High School is a public high school located in Elk Grove, California, a suburban community near Sacramento, California established in 1994 as the fourth high school in Elk Grove. Laguna Creek is the only school in the Elk Grove Unified School district that offers the International Baccalaureate (IB) Programme.

== Academics ==
=== International Baccalaureate ===
Offered at Laguna Creek are the IB Diploma Programme (IBDP) and the IB Middle Years Programme (MYP). IBDP courses can be taken by juniors and seniors as most of the IB courses are two year courses.

=== Advanced Placement and Honors Courses ===
Due to being an IB school, most advanced classes at Laguna Creek are IB classes. However, the school does offer a limited selection of AP courses and honors courses.

== Academies ==
=== Green Energy Technology Academy ===
Students of the Green Energy Technology Academy (GETA) study the technology of renewable energy. These GETA students explore the concepts of energy extraction, conversion and transmission processes through complex, hands-on, project-based work. Depending on a their post secondary plans, students who graduate from the Green Energy Technology Academy will be prepared to enter two or four institutions of study, enter a technical training program or go directly to work in the Energy Sector.

=== Manufacturing Production Technology Academy ===
The Manufacturing Production Technology Academy (MPTA) program prepares students for a career in crafts work and engineering. Projects range from helpful community projects such as developing and manufacturing toys for children with cerebral palsy to developing basic engine automobiles. The department allows selected MPTA students to enter a program that provides hands-on opportunities.

=== Sports Career Academy ===
The Sports Career Academy (SCA) focuses on exposing students to careers in the sports industry, specifically Sports Medicine. Additionally, sports-related themes are woven into academic classes to address students' interests.

Lambda Delta Rho is an honor society developed within the Sports Careers Academy. This honor society promotes the principles of Leadership (Lambda), Discipline (Delta), and Respect (Rho) as the foundations for academic and personal success. Students may qualify for this honor society based on their academic performance each term, and may earn rewards as a result. To attain status in the honor society, students must earn a 2.5 GPA or higher and earn no F grades or Unsatisfactory marks in behavior. Within the honor society, there are 3 different levels. The lowest qualifying level is Rho status. A student may qualify for Rho status if they earn between a 2.5 GPA and a 2.99. The second level is Delta Status. A student may qualify as Delta for earning between 3.0 and a 3.49 GPA. The highest level is Lambda status. Students must earn a qualifying GPA of over 3.5 to achieve this level.

== Extracurricular activities ==
=== Laguna Creek Marching Band and Color Guard ===
The Laguna Creek HS Marching Band and Color Guard has seven core performance ensembles:

- Marching Band (fall semester)
- Color Guard (fall semester)
- Jazz Ensemble (fall and spring semester)
- Winter Guard (spring semester)
- Winter Percussion (spring semester)
- Symphonic Band (spring semester)
- Wind Ensemble (spring semester)

The Marching Band and Color Guard compete in the fall as members of the Western Band Association (WBA), and Northern California Band Association (NCBA), in the 4A division.

Previous honors have included Sweepstakes Trophies for Field performance at the Franklin Invitational, Del Oro Band Spectacular, and Lodi Grape Bowl Classic in 2019.

=== Winter Guard ===
The Laguna Creek Winter Guard formerly competed in the California Color Guard Circuit (CCGC) until 2022, first starting in the Scholastic A division, and then moving to the Scholastic Open division in 2020 . They currently compete in the Scholastic Open division in the Central Valley Guard and Percussion Alliance (CVGPA), based in California. The LCHS guard started to compete in 2016 in the Schoolastic Open division in Winter Guard International (WGI).

Past titles include and CCGC Scholastic A Champions in 2018, and WGI Union City Regional Scholastic A gold medalist in 2019, CVGPA Scholastic Open Champions of 2023, 2025, and 2026, WGI Union City Regional in 2025 and 2026, as well as 2025 WGI San Diego Regional silver medalist and the WGI Palm Desert Power Regional bronze medalist.

The LCHS guard has attended WGI world championships in Dayton Ohio three times, in 2022, 2024, and 2026, making Semi-Finals each time. The guard also attends the WGI San Diego, Union City, and Palm Desert regionals yearly.

=== Winter Percussion ===
The Laguna Creek Winter Percussion Ensemble competes in the Scholastic Open division in the NCPA (Northern California Percussion Alliance) and WGI.

== Athletics ==
Laguna Creek offers multiple sports throughout the school year.

Fall season:

- Cheer
- Cross country
- Football (varsity and junior varsity)
- Golf (girls)
- Tennis (girls)
- Water polo (boys and girls)
- Volleyball (girls, varsity and junior varsity)

Winter season:

- Basketball (boys: varsity and junior varsity, girls: varsity and junior varsity)
- Wrestling
- Soccer (boys: varsity and junior varsity, girls: varsity and junior varsity)

Spring season:

- Track
- Baseball (varsity and junior varsity)
- Softball (varsity and junior varsity)
- Swim (junior varsity)
- Volleyball (boys)
- Golf (boys)
- Tennis (boys)

== Notable alumni ==
- Casey Weathers — member of the 2008 Summer Olympics United States baseball team
- Brad Kilby — former pitcher of the Oakland Athletics
- Danny Castillo — former UFC/WEC fighter, Team Alpha Male
- Jeremy Ross — Arizona Cardinals
- Maria Kang — fitness advocate and founder of No Excuse Mom movement
- Jason Porter — semi-professional NBA player
- Dallas Humber — white supremacist and convicted terrorist
