= 2022 Bratislava shooting =

Attack in Bratislava, Slovakia

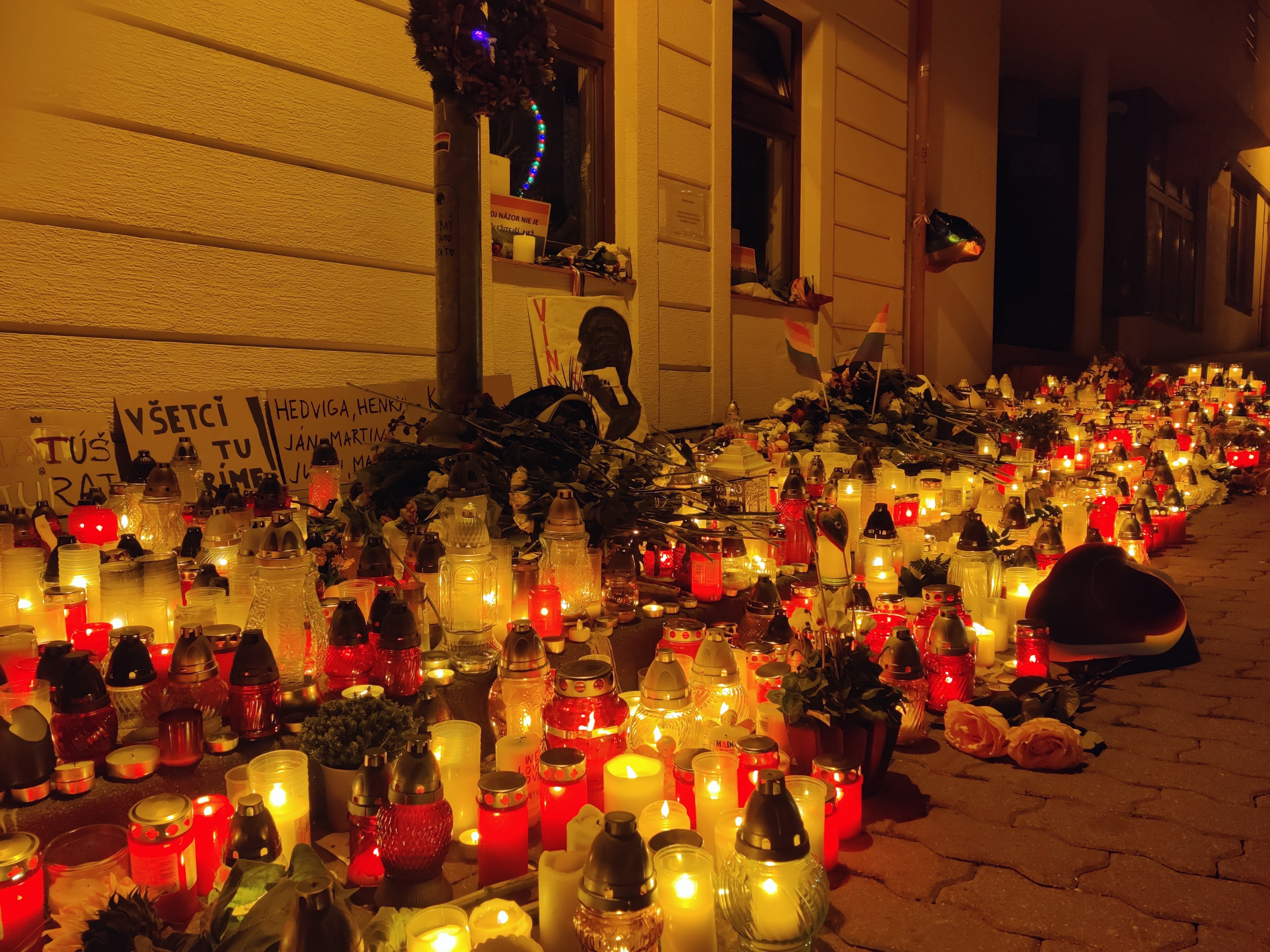
- Lit candles and flowers laid by mourners in front of Tepláreň on 14 October 2022
- Location: 48°08′41.2″N 17°06′04.5″E; Zámocká 30, Bratislava, Slovakia
- Date: 12 October 2022 c. 19:11 CEST
- Target: LGBT community, Eduard Heger
- Attack type: Double murder; murder-suicide; domestic terrorism; homophobic hate crime
- Weapons: Kimber 1911 .45-caliber pistol with laser sight (used in the shooting); Another unnamed handgun (used in suicide)
- Deaths: 3 (including the perpetrator) (Note: The shooter committed suicide a few hours later at another location.)
- Injuries: 1
- Perpetrator: Juraj Krajčík
- Motive: Far-right extremism Accelerationism; Anti-semitism; Homophobia; White supremacy Transphobia; Christchurch mosque shootings copycat crime

The 2022 Bratislava shooting was an attack that occurred on 12 October 2022 outside Tepláreň, a gay bar in Bratislava, Slovakia. A 19-year-old perpetrator shot and killed two people and wounded a third outside the venue's entrance. Following an investigation by the National Crime Agency (NAKA), Slovak authorities reclassified the incident from a hate-motivated murder to an act of domestic terrorism, designating it as the first terrorist attack in modern Slovak history. The Bar is a well-known spot frequented by the local LGBTQ community. The shooting claimed two victims: Juraj Vankulič, a non-binary person, and Matúš Horváth, a bisexual man. The perpetrator was found dead from a self-inflicted gunshot the morning after the attack.

The investigation classified the shooting as a terrorist attack and found that primary targets included high level politicians. According to the shooter's own words on a 4chan thread that he authored, "2-1 kdr, not my problem. wish i couldve gone higher but whatever. wanted to bag the prime minister but i didn't get lucky with his car arriving". The primary target was Eduard Heger; the attack on Tepláreň was a plan B.

== Shooting ==
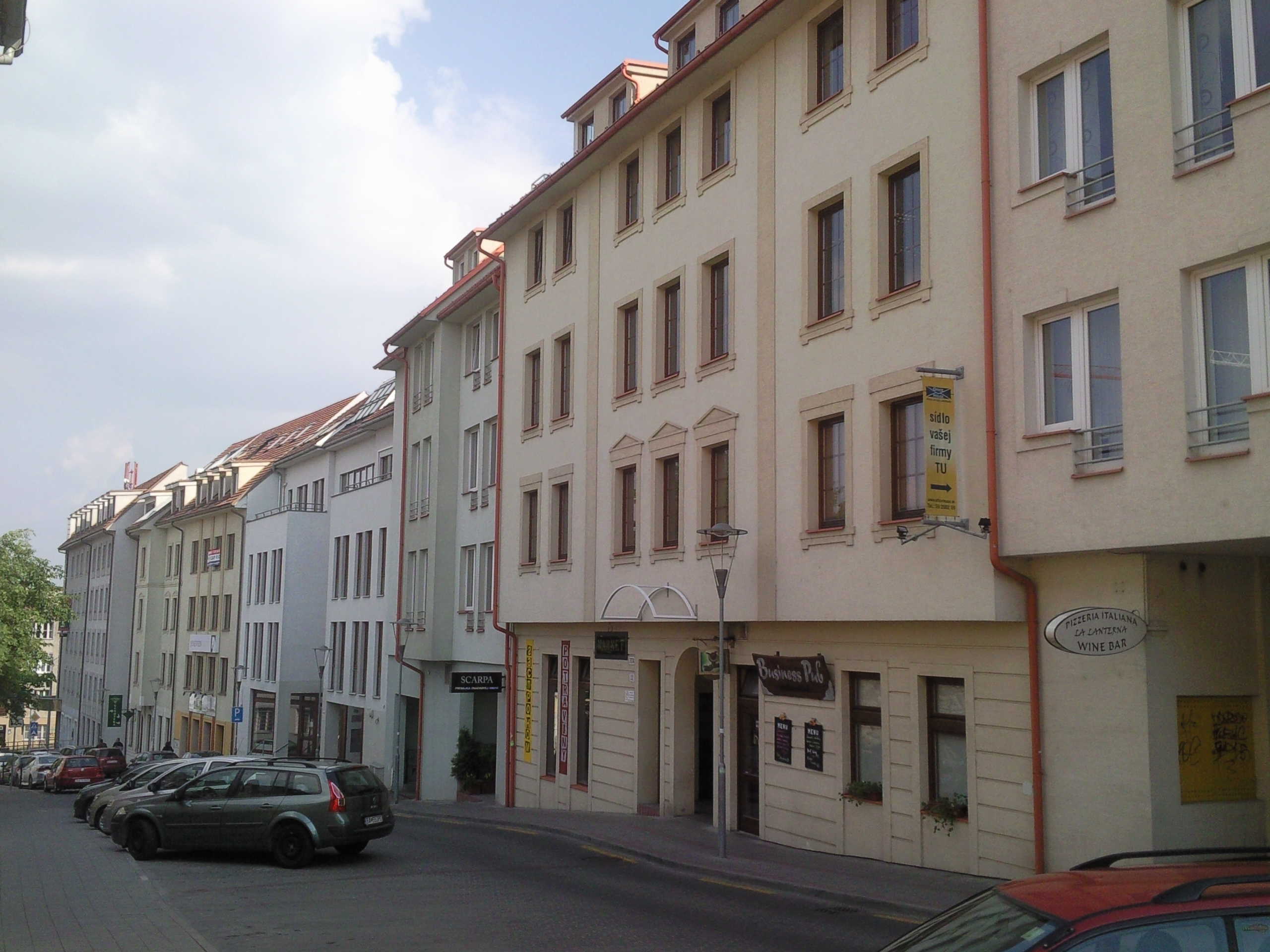
The building where Tepláreň is located. Before the shooting, the killer hid in the alcove on the right of the picture

According to security camera footage, the attacker, dressed in all black, wearing a black cap and a black face mask, arrived at the crime scene at approximately 18:35 CEST. He then hid in an alcove next door from Tepláreň for about half an hour. At 19:11, the shooter fired eight shots, killing two and injuring one. A minute later, the first report was received at the 112 emergency line.

First responders arrived at the scene at 19:16. They reported two people dead, and a third victim was transported to a hospital in stable condition. The police closed off all surrounding streets and began searching for the killer with the aid of a police helicopter. At 19:48, police had reported the shooting on social media and warned the public to stay vigilant, as the killer remained at large. Sometime between 8pm and 10pm, the shooter returned and spent time at home, informed his parents of the act, before departing once more. The parents did not report him to the Slovak authorities.

By 22:30, the police had identified the perpetrator as Juraj Krajčík with the aid of the SIS. At 22:57, Krajčík messaged his father that they "will see each other on the other side". On 13 October 2022, at 5:15, the police received the location of the shooter's phone, provided by the operator. At around 7am, the attacker was found dead from a self-inflicted gunshot wound in a Bratislava park.

== Investigation ==
Police did not initially determine a motive for the shooting. On 14 October, the police confirmed it as being investigated as a hate crime with the possibility for the crime to be reclassified as a terrorist attack. The same day, the police stated they did not have any information about the attacker's sympathies for extreme ideologies prior to the killing. The police refused to confirm or deny whether the attacker had foreign accomplices, but confirmed that the investigation of the crime will include Interpol and the FBI.

The police confirmed reports that the attacker returned to his home after the shooting. He had a fight with his parents who reportedly knew of the attack but did not report it to the police. The attacker switched the murder weapon with a different one, which he later used for suicide. The murder weapon was found in the house alongside a suicide note. The parents were under investigation for failure to report the suspicious behavior of their son to the police.

The investigation was closed in December 2023, confirming Juraj Krajčík was the perpetrator of the act. According to the special prosecutor, Daniel Lipšic, Krajčík initially targeted the Prime Minister Eduard Heger and waited in front of his house but changed his target to Tepláreň when he realized he would not be able to get close to the politician. Krajčík called a suicide prevention line two days before the deed, saying he was "very afraid but had to die". It was further confirmed that Krajčík's parents were aware of their son's actions and his plans to commit suicide but took no action to obstruct the plans or inform the authorities.

== Victims ==
The shooting claimed two victims: Juraj Vankulič, a non-binary person, and Matúš Horváth, a bisexual man.

=== Juraj Vankulič ===
Juraj Vankulič was born in Žilina on 1 February 1996, to their mother Dana, not having met their biological father. As a child they were baptised, and used to sing at a local church. They had a close relationship with their step-father and their younger brother Samko.

Growing up, Vankulič went to study abroad in Denmark. They held a C2 level Cambridge English language proficiency certificate. After returning from Denmark, they were employed at a H&M clothing store in Bratislava, with Vankulič working as a visual merchandiser.

Around the age of 15, they came out as gay and later as nonbinary, using he/they pronouns. Among their interests and hobbies were poetry, dance, fashion and drag performance under the name Sue Cidal. Their dream was to move to Prague.

== Perpetrator ==
The perpetrator was identified as 19-year old Juraj Krajčik (28 July 2003 — 13 October 2022). The day prior to the attack, Twitter account NTMA0315 owned by Krajčík, published statements including "I have made my decision", "it will be done" and "Race First. Always". It also posted links to an original manifesto with extremist far-right anti-semitic, homophobic and transphobic views. In addition to Twitter, the murderer also posted his pictures on 4chan. His Twitter account had been suspended by the time the perpetrator's body was discovered.

The Twitter account also contained several selfies of himself, including one from August 2022 in front of Tepláreň and another one in front of the home of the Prime Minister Eduard Heger, whom he also mentioned as the top priority target in his manifesto. In addition to Heger, the manifesto mentioned other politicians as targets, including former Minister of Education Branislav Gröhling and opposition leader and former Prime Minister Robert Fico.

According to Matej Medvecký, a counter-extremism expert, the murderer had also been active in Terrorgram communities and subscribed to the ideology of militant accelerationism, supported by terrorist groups such as Atomwaffen Division. On Terrorgram, which Krajčík cited as inspiration for the shooting, Dallas Humber called him "St. Juraj Krajčík, Tarrant's sixth disciple and Terrorgram's first saint", an instance of sanctification done in the group.

=== Manifesto ===
Just a few hours before the attack, links to a 65-page long manifesto were posted on Twitter. In the document, the author does not provide their name, claiming it is not of importance and "will be known later anyway", but identifies himself as a man of Slovak origin born on 28 July 2003, who has decided to "execute an operation" against "the enemies of the white race".

The manifesto blames Jews and LGBT people for "causing harm to white people" and celebrates far-right murderers, including Anders Breivik, Brenton Tarrant and John Earnest. The manifesto mentions the author's hatred for Islam as his first politically incorrect position. The text also attributes COVID-19 pandemic and vaccination measures to a "Jewish plot to train the white race to be obedient" and denies the Holocaust. It also glorifies a 22-year-old Slovak man in particular, known on Telegram as Slovakbro, who was arrested by the police in May 2022 for promoting right-wing extremism and calling for the overthrow of the democratic system in Slovakia by means of sabotage and terrorism.

The Telegram group known as Terrorgram was mentioned in his manifesto, and credited with "Building the future of the White revolution, one publication at a time."

== Aftermath ==
On 13 October 2022, president Zuzana Čaputová visited Tepláreň to commemorate the victims. She gave a short speech to the media. An improvised march to the SNP square followed, with hundreds of attendees. Another march took place the same day in Košice, with a few hundred participants.

On 14 October 2022, a vigil titled "March against Hatred", organized by the local LGBT advocacy group Iniciatíva Inakost, took place in Bratislava. Participants marched from Tepláreň to the SNP square, where the proprietor of Tepláreň, president Zuzana Čaputová, mayor of Bratislava Matúš Vallo and governor of Bratislava region Juraj Droba as well as other Slovak politicians and celebrities gave speeches commemorating the victims, denouncing the crime and expressing support to the LGBT community. Prime Minister Eduard Heger was in the crowd, but did not give a speech. It is estimated that around 15,000 to 20,000 people have participated.

On 16 October 2022, a protest took place in front of the Slovak National Council building as a reaction to the attack.

== Reactions ==
=== Domestic ===
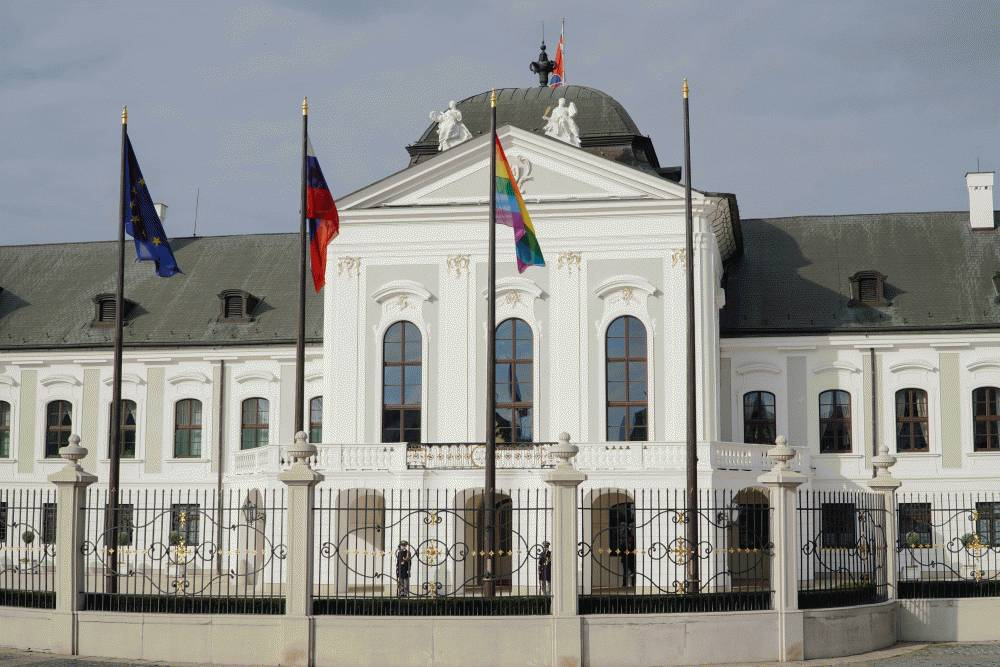
Rainbow flag raised at the Grassalkovich Palace in solidarity with the LGBT community

The attack was condemned by many political representatives, including mayor of Bratislava Matúš Vallo, and mayor of Old Town district Zuzana Aufrichtová. President Zuzana Čaputová pointed out the likely hateful motive of the act and stated that this hatred towards minorities had been fueled for a long time by "the stupid and irresponsible statements of politicians," whom she called on to stop hateful rhetoric "before more lives are lost". A rainbow flag was raised in solidarity with the LGBT community at the Grassalkovich palace.

Prime Minister Eduard Heger condemned the attack and said "It is unacceptable that anyone should fear for their life because of their way of life..." He later apologized for describing one's sexual orientation this way and stated support for the LGBT community.

The rector of Comenius University Marek Števček issued a press release informing that a student of the Faculty of Arts, Matúš Horváth, was one of the two victims of the shooting. The rector condemned the killing and called for the entire society to unite against hate and discrimination. The Faculty of Arts installed the rainbow flag on its building as a sign of its solidarity with the LGBTI community.

=== International ===
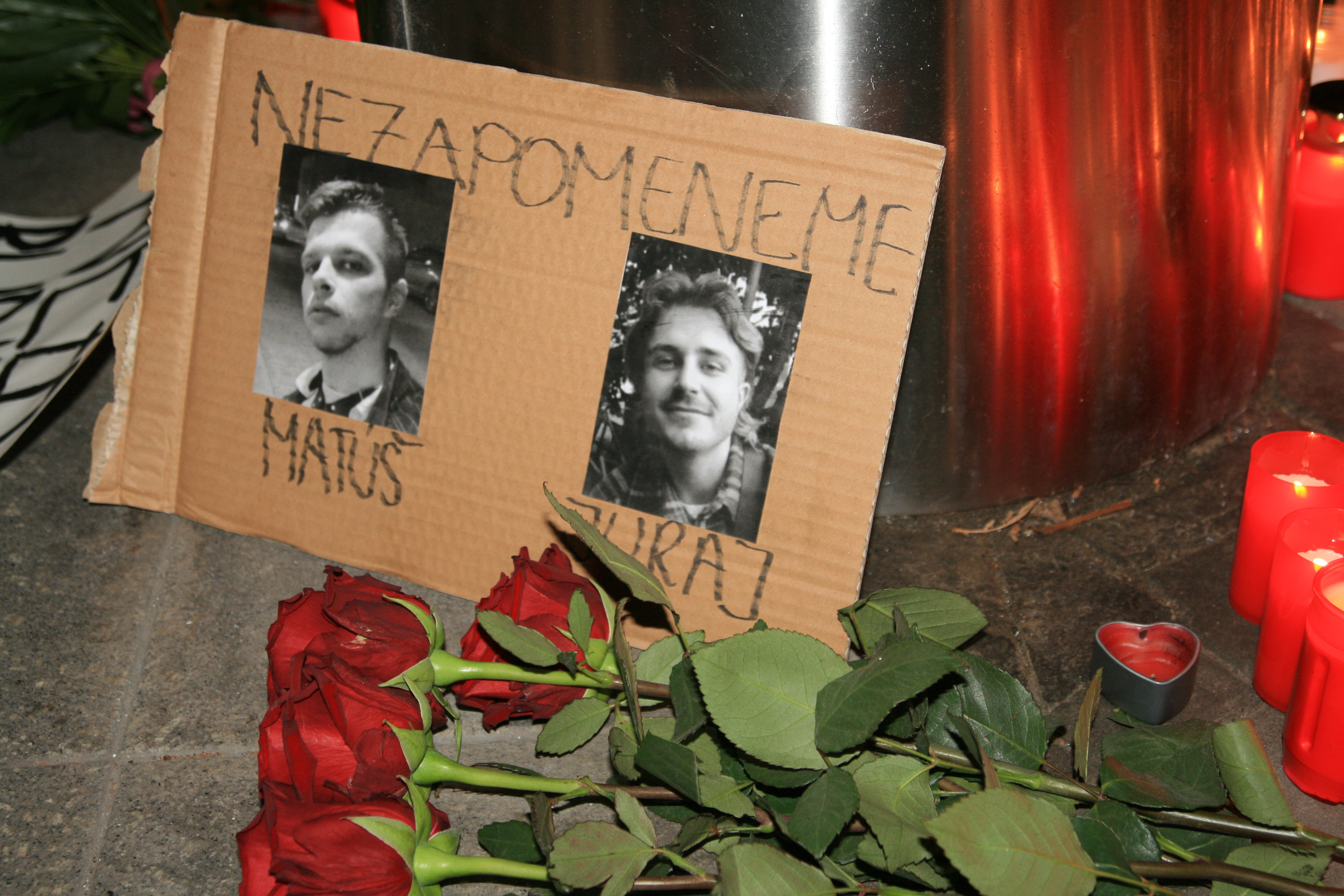
Pictures of the victims at the memorial event in Brno on October 13, 2022.

Among foreign state and political representatives, Czech Prime Minister Petr Fiala expressed his condolences to the survivors of the victims. The Czech Minister of the Interior, Vít Rakušan, added that there is no place in a decent society "for unjustified discrimination of LGBT people". President of the European Commission Ursula von der Leyen expressed her condolences and added that "We have to protect the LGBTIQ community".

== See also ==
- 2010 Bratislava shooting
- 2022 Oslo shooting
- 1999 London nail bombings
