= Terrorgram =

Network of neo-fascist Telegram channels

Logo of Terrorgram, which is a combination of the Telegram app logo and Waffen-SS insignia

Terrorgram, (sometimes stylized in all caps) also known as the Terrorgram Collective is a decentralized network of far-right and neo-fascist Telegram accounts and channels that subscribe to or promote militant accelerationism. Terrorgram channels regularly share instructions, manuals, and targets for mass shootings and attacks on critical infrastructure. Terrorgram is a key communications medium for individuals and networks attached to Atomwaffen Division, The Base, and other militant accelerationist groups.

Influenced by the defunct neo-Nazi web forum Iron March, Terrorgram has been linked to several terrorist attacks. It promotes "Saints culture", which portrays terrorists as "saints" or "martyrs". It has been proscribed as a terrorist organization in and faces terrorist sanctions from Australia, Canada, New Zealand, the United States, and the United Kingdom.

== Origins and history ==
Terrorgram has gone through several different phases. Terrorgram was influenced by the defunct neo-Nazi web forum Iron March, which popularized the book Siege by American neo-Nazi James Mason, a work promoting the establishment of underground, leaderless terrorist cells, working towards destabilizing society and ushering in revolution. Terrorgram grew in large part from the defunct Iron March and Fascist Forge, and it was the principal successor to Iron March as Fascist Forge failed to find an audience.

The far-right scene on Telegram was not prominent before March 2019, though some far-right groups had moved to Telegram by that point, among them the Atomwaffen Division, Generation Identity, and the Proud Boys. Following the March 2019 Christchurch mosque shootings, 8chan users feared a crackdown, and some suggested moving to Telegram. Neo-Nazi groups on Telegram rapidly increased in membership; after Christchurch, between May and October 2019, membership in neo-Nazi and white supremacist groups on Telegram went up 120%, including previously stagnant channels, while many new ones were created.

In 2021, the Institute for Strategic Dialogue (ISD), an international think-tank, exposed more than 200 neo-Nazi pro-terrorism Telegram channels that make up the Terrorgram network, many of which contained instructions for building weapons and bombs. Telegram shadowbans channels promoting violence, but according to Southern Poverty Law Center such channels grew exponentially despite Telegram's policing, one accelerationist channel boasting 16,552 followers.

On 8 December 2023, two Ontario men were charged with making propaganda for Terrorgram and for terrorism offenses. On September 9, 2024, U.S. prosecutors in California charged Dallas Humber, 34, and Matthew Robert Allison, 37, accused of leading the "Terrorgram" network with soliciting hate crimes, soliciting the murder of Federal officials, and conspiring to provide material support to terrorists. Humber accepted a plea bargain and was sentenced to 30 years in prison. New Jersey man Andrew Takhistov was charged with plotting an attack on energy infrastructure and a synagogue. Takhistov stated that he was involved in the production of Terrorgram propaganda. As of February 2025, there are over two dozen Terrorgram cases around the world. In the United States Brandon Russell and Sarah Beth Clandaniel were charged with conspiring to bomb the electric infrastructure of Baltimore to cause a blackout. Both were subsequently convicted. Russell and Clandaniel were active in Terrorgram. A 29-year-old man from Ishøj, Denmark was arrested on December 9, 2024 and charged with nine counts of inciting terrorism for his promotion of Terrorgram material. The man also shared a communique from Brandon Russell, the founder of the terror group Atomwaffen.

Terrorgram was allegedly behind a plot to kill Labor MP Tim Crakanthorp in Australia in 2024, when a man was intercepted near Crakanthorp's office with weapons. A Tennessee man has been charged in 2025 with the arson of Highlander Research and Education Center involved in the Civil Rights Movement. The offices were destroyed in the blaze along with decades of archives and artifacts. The man had previously been convicted in 2019 for burning down an adult video store. He discussed his attacks in accelerationist neo-Nazi channels. A 24-year-old man was indicted in Northern California in July 2025 for "eight counts of conspiracy, soliciting the murder of federal officials, doxing federal officials and interstate threatening communications". The man was allegedly a member of the Terrorgram and conspired with fellow users to assassinate US officials.

Institute for Strategic Dialogue described the collective as effectively defunct in 2024 due to arrests of key figures.

== Ideology and organization ==
Terrorgram is decentralized and its channels promote far-right, neo-fascist ideology. Some channels are ecofascist in nature, promoting an anti-human ideology, though this is only a subset and most are more traditionally far-right. The terminology "Terrorgram" was only sometimes used by the members and the terminology was not universal. Members share violent and snuff videos.

Aesthetics in media produced by the community are often vaporwave or fashwave, with neon colors juxtaposed with classical images. "Terrorwave", which developed in part due to Iron March, features graphics rendered in red, white and black. The style often incorporates images of historical fascists, terrorists or paramilitaries wearing skull masks, with esoteric far-right symbols and simplistic slogans, such as "TRAITORS WILL HANG" and "RAPE THE POLICE". There is also a strong strain of esotericism and occultism woven into Terrorgram propaganda, lending a mystic sheen to the movement. Esoteric Hitlerism is frequently referenced.

Calls to violence are common, and channels regularly share instructions and manuals on how to carry out hate crimes, mass shootings and target critical infrastructure and even lists of potential targets. Terrorgram is a key communications forum for individuals and networks attached to Atomwaffen Division, The Base, and other explicit militant accelerationist groups. White supremacist works Siege and The Turner Diaries are both commonly spread within the channels. The 2019 novella Harassment Architecture written by Mike Ma is popular with and was widely distributed by Terrorgram. The works of Joshua Caleb Sutter were also popular. Some channels are "book clubs" or provide reading material. A "White Boy Summer" reading list from 2021 included only two works: Mike Ma's other novel Gothic Violence, and one of Terrorgram's own manuals.

=== Sanctification ===
Terrorgram propagates "Saints culture", what terrorism scholar Graham Macklin called "a 'dark fandom' that venerates and valorizes extreme-right terrorists as 'saints' and 'martyrs' in a manner similar to the heroization of school shooters and serial killers". In the event of an accelerationist, supremacist or neo-Nazi attack, Terrorgram sees the members of the collective engaged in the search for signs attesting to the ideological closeness in order to sanctify the attacker.

The sanctification of a terrorist leads to their entry into the pantheon of terrorist-saints that are taken as models by Terrorgram. Among these, some can be identified who can be considered as founders of the ideological core, so-called founding saints: Brenton Tarrant, Theodore Kaczynski, Anders Behring Breivik, Timothy McVeigh, Charles Manson and Dylann Roof. The five criteria required to become a saint include being of white race, conducting a deliberate attack, having motive to kill those who "threaten the white race," a "score" of killing at least one, and sharing the ideology of white supremacy.

== Publications ==
Following the ideological standard of Siege and The Turner Diaries, detailed instructions for attacking critical infrastructure are found in white supremacist manuals and propaganda distributed over Terrorgram channels. Terrorgram issued the third installment of a digital magazine series called Hard Reset which glorifies white supremacist attacks and gives explanations for sector-specific critical infrastructure targeting and gives detailed tactical information and targeting. On 28 December 2023, Terrorgram published a manual for the improvised manufacture of explosives using urea nitrate.

In June 2021, the collective published a guide online with incitements for attacks on infrastructure and violence against minorities, police, public figures, journalists and other perceived enemies. In December 2021, they published a second document containing ideological sections on accelerationism, white supremacy, and ecofascism, together with practical instructions.

A 24-minute video titled White Terror, made by Terrorgram, was originally released on 14 October 2022. It celebrates dozens of individuals who committed acts of violence and terrorism from 1968 to the present against the government, police officers, women, Jews, Muslims, Sikhs, immigrants, people of color, LGBTQ people, leftists, journalists, and medical professionals. In addition to praising the perpetrators and referring to them as "saints," the video encourages further acts of terrorism, stating that future attacks will be honored. The video contains footage taken from the 2019 Christchurch shooting and 2022 Buffalo attack videos in addition to news clips. In March 2023, Dallas Erin Humber was found to be the narrator of the Terrorgram videos.

== Attacks ==
Year	Occurrence	Location	Killed	Wounded	Source
2022	Bratislava shooting	Bratislava, Slovakia	3 (Note: Including the perpetrator.)	1	
2022	Aracruz school shootings	Aracruz, Brazil	4	11	
2024	Eskişehir mosque stabbing	Eskişehir, Turkey	0	5	
2024	Abundant Life Christian School shooting	Madison, United States	3	6	
2025	Antioch High School shooting	Nashville, United States	2	1	
2025	February 2025 Trump assassination plot	Waukesha, United States	2	0	
2026	2026 Islamic Center of San Diego shooting	San Diego, United States	5	1	

== Response ==
The Terrorgram Collective has been deemed a terrorist entity or faces terrorist sanctions from the United Kingdom, the United States Department of State, and Australia. The United Kingdom added Terrorgram collective to the list of proscribed organizations in April 2024. Home Secretary James Cleverly stated that "The Terrorgram collective spreads vile propaganda and aims to radicalise young people to conduct heinous terrorist acts". On January 13, 2025 the United States Department of State designated Terrorgram as a terrorist organization and sanctioned its leaders Ciro Daniel Amorim Ferreira, Noah Licul and Hendrik-Wahl Muller. The Australian foreign affairs minister, Penny Wong, stated on February 2, 2025, that terrorism sanctions had been placed on the Terrorgram network. On June 27, 2025, Terrorgram was officially listed as a terrorist organization in Australia. On December 10, 2025, the Terrorgram Collective was designated as a terror group by Canada and New Zealand.

== See also ==
- American Futurist
- Right-wing terrorism
- Order of Nine Angles
- White Resistance Manual
- True Crime Community
