= Turtle Bay Exploration Park =

Nature park in Redding, California

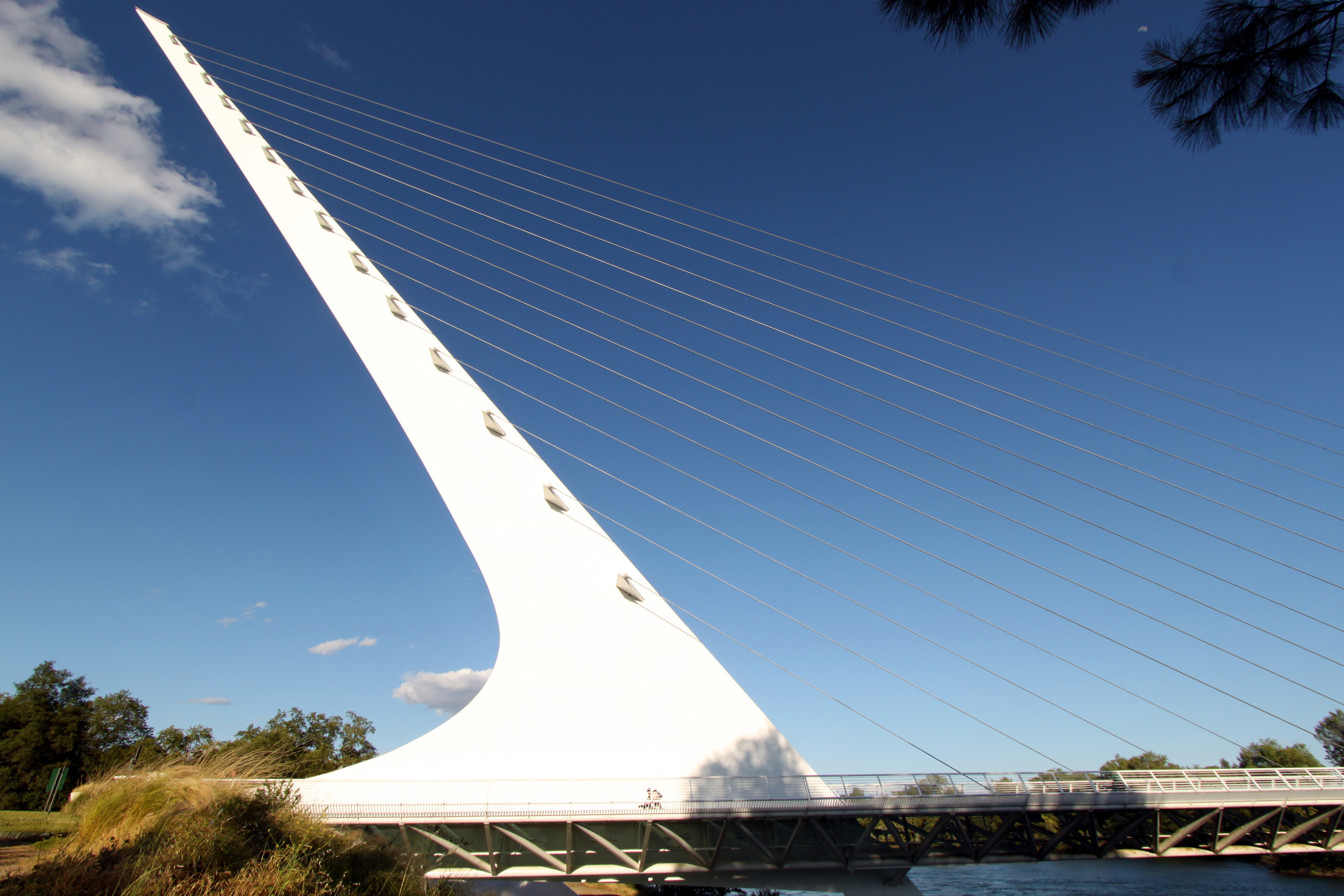
- Opened July 4, 2004, the Sundial Bridge links the north and south campuses of Turtle Bay Exploration Park and serves as an entrance for Redding's Sacramento River Trail.
- Established: 1997
- Location: 844 Sundial Bridge Drive; Redding, California
- Coordinates: 40°35′24″N 122°22′30″W
- Type: Arboretum and children's museum
- Website: www.turtlebay.org

Turtle Bay Exploration Park is a 300-acre, mostly outdoor cultural center located in Redding, California. Situated along the banks of the Sacramento River, the park features the Turtle Bay Museum, as well as the Sundial Bridge, a 700-foot long, 23-foot wide footbridge designed by architect Santiago Calatrava. The park has indoor and outdoor animal exhibits, gardens, and playgrounds for children. The museum conducts educational programs and exhibitions on the Wintu people, including a full-size shelter.

== McConnell Arboretum & Botanical Gardens ==
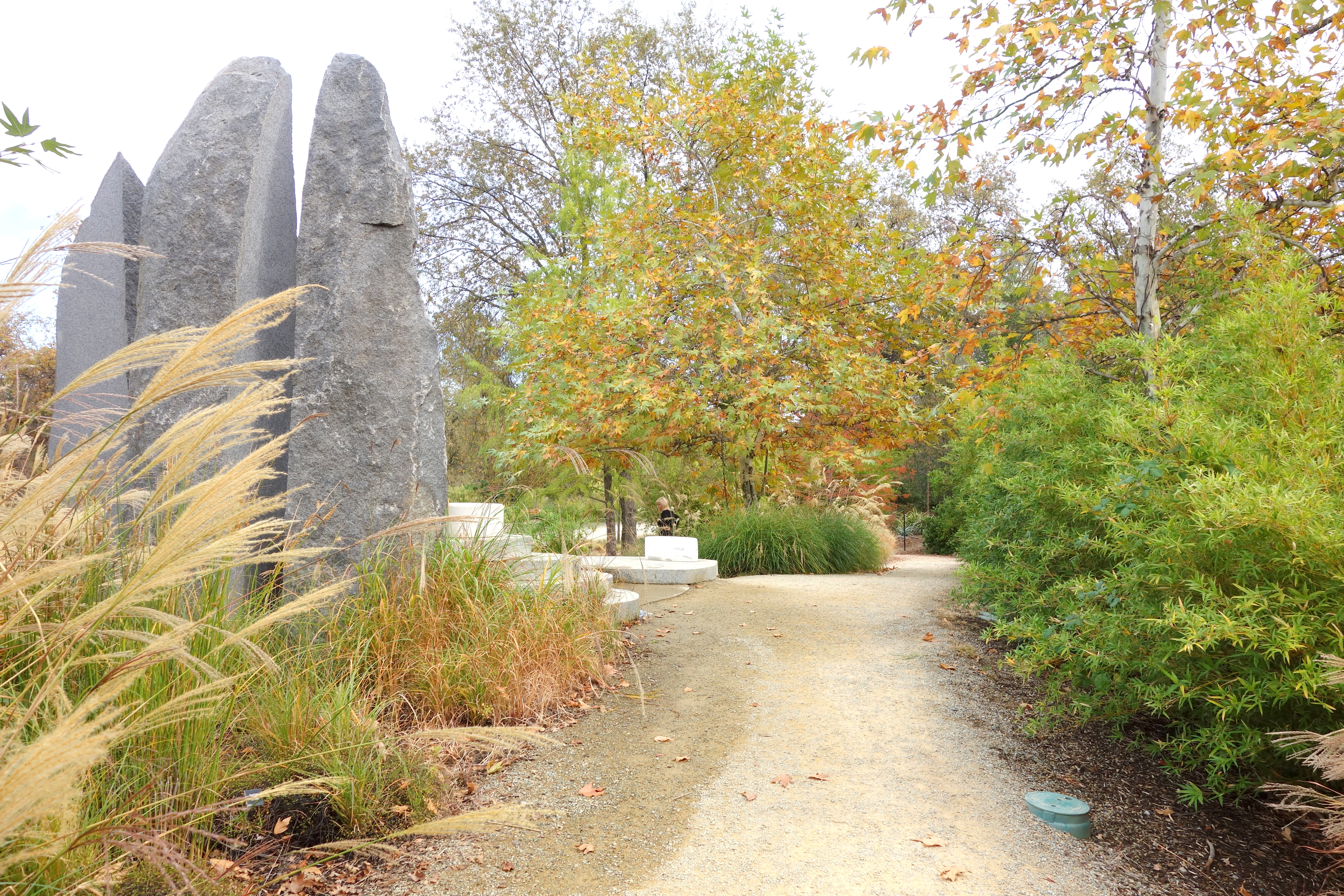
McConnell Arboretum

The McConnell Arboretum & Botanical Gardens, also known as the Redding Arboretum, opened on May 30, 2005, and covers 300 acres (120 hectares), including 200 acres (81 hectares) of undeveloped arboretum and 20 acres (8.1 hectares) of botanical garden that span the Sacramento River. Its principal gardens include the Mediterranean Climate Gardens (Mediterranean Basin, South Africa, Chile, southern and western Australia, and California west of the Sierra Nevada), and other gardens including a children's garden, butterfly garden, and specialty gardens.

== Turtle Bay Museum ==
Turtle Bay Museum contains permanent and changing exhibits related to the area's natural history, cultural history, art and science. Exhibits include a tank for viewing fish underwater, a recreation of a Native American bark house, hands-on science displays and art creations.

== Paul Bunyan's Forest Camp ==
Paul Bunyan's Forest Camp is an education exploration center modeled after an old-time forest camp. The Mill Building houses displays of northern California forests and local wildlife, including live animals. Outdoor exhibits focus on the timber and logging industries in California and the railroads. Other amenities include outdoor play equipment, a water feature, an amphitheater that hosts a seasonal animal show, and a seasonal aviary and butterfly house.

== Gallery ==
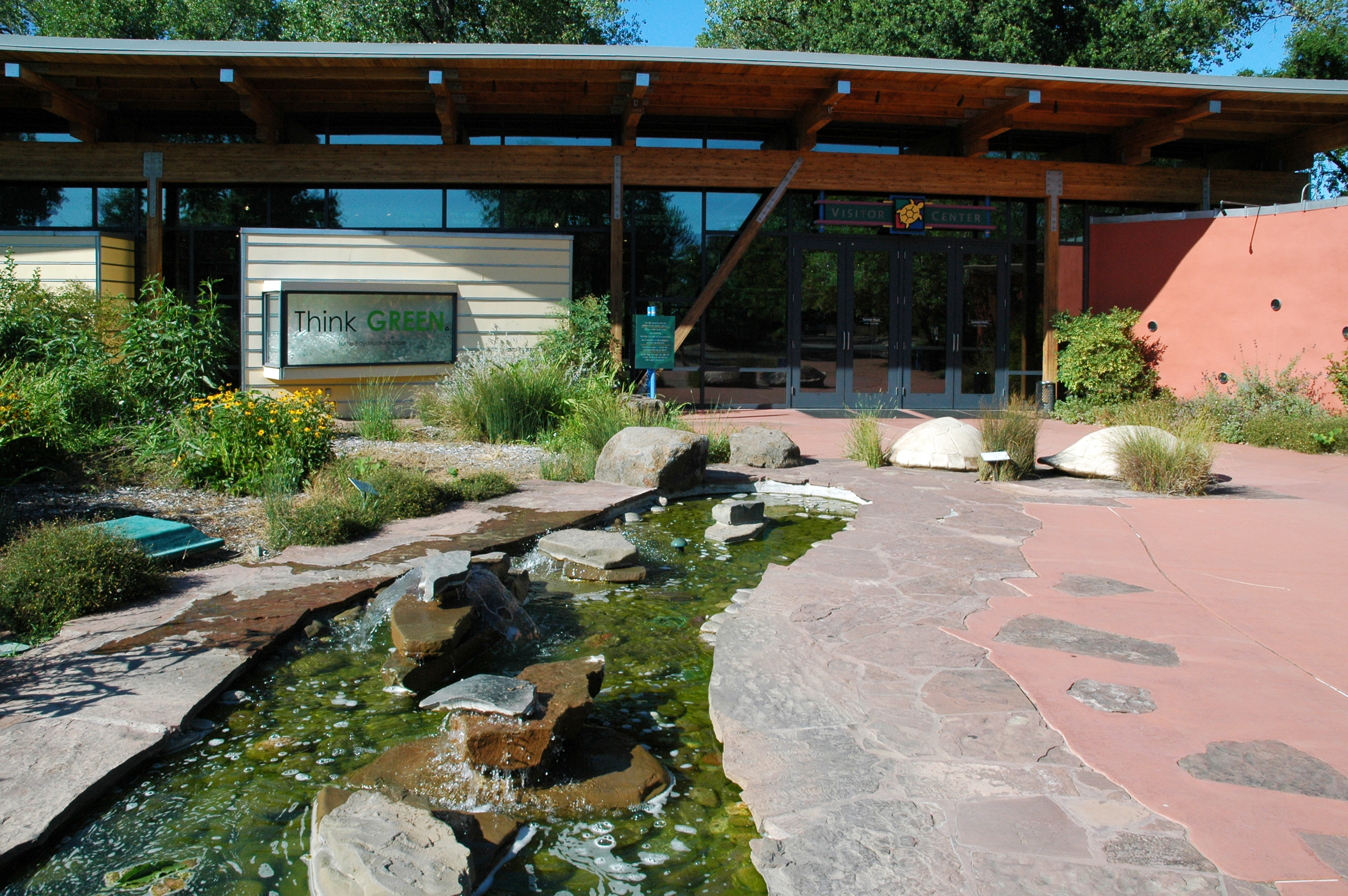
Visitor center

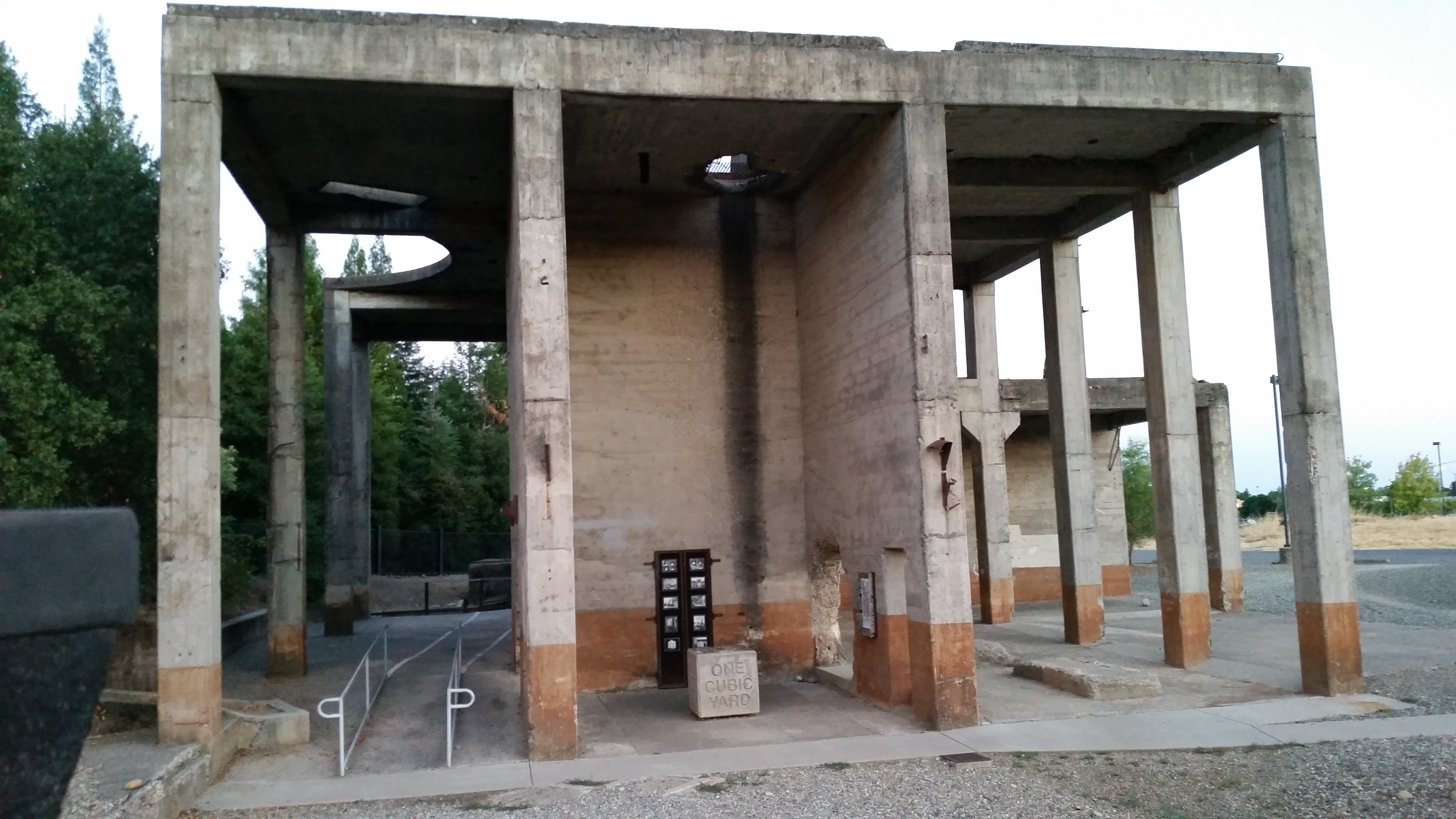
Monolith by Buster Simpson

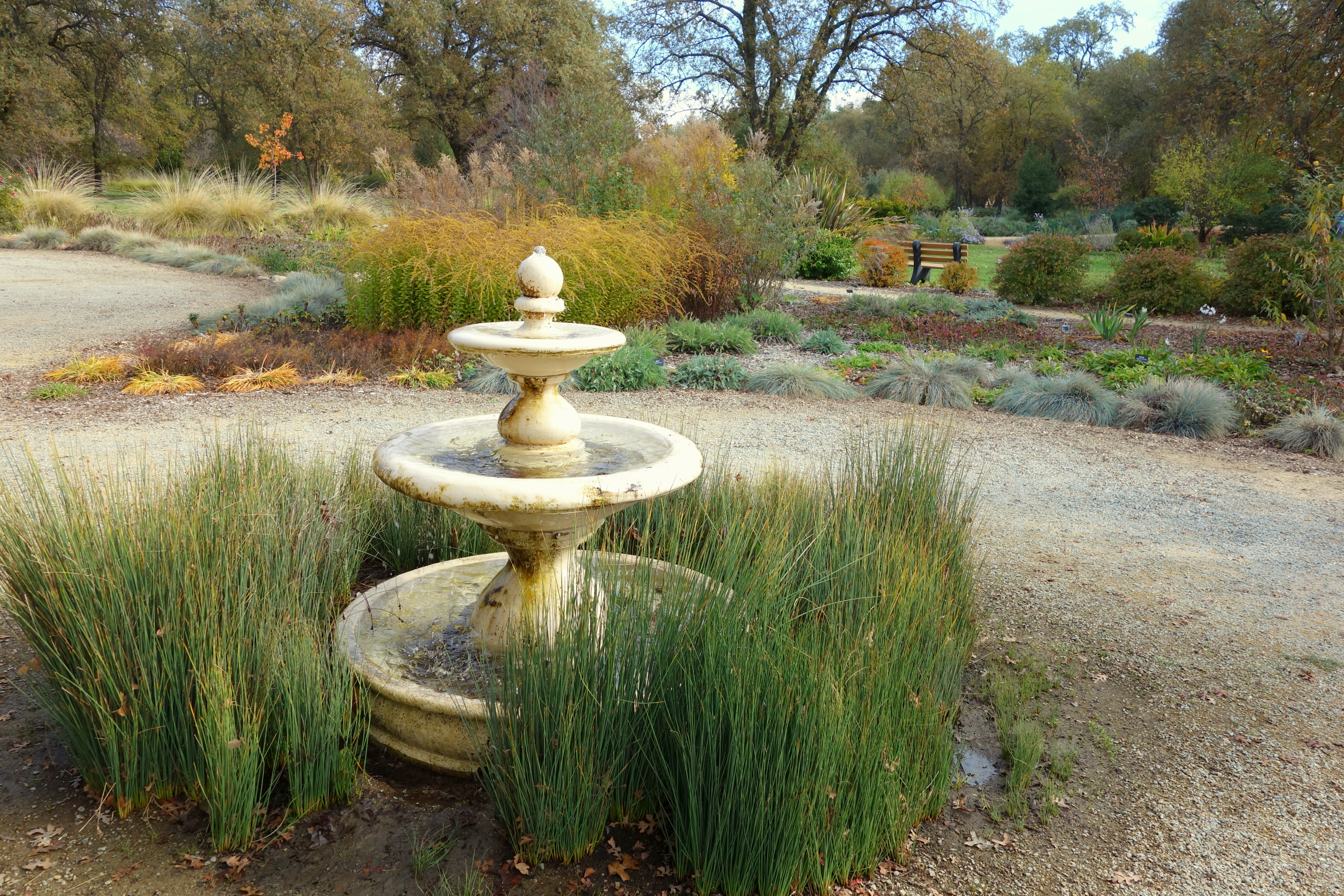

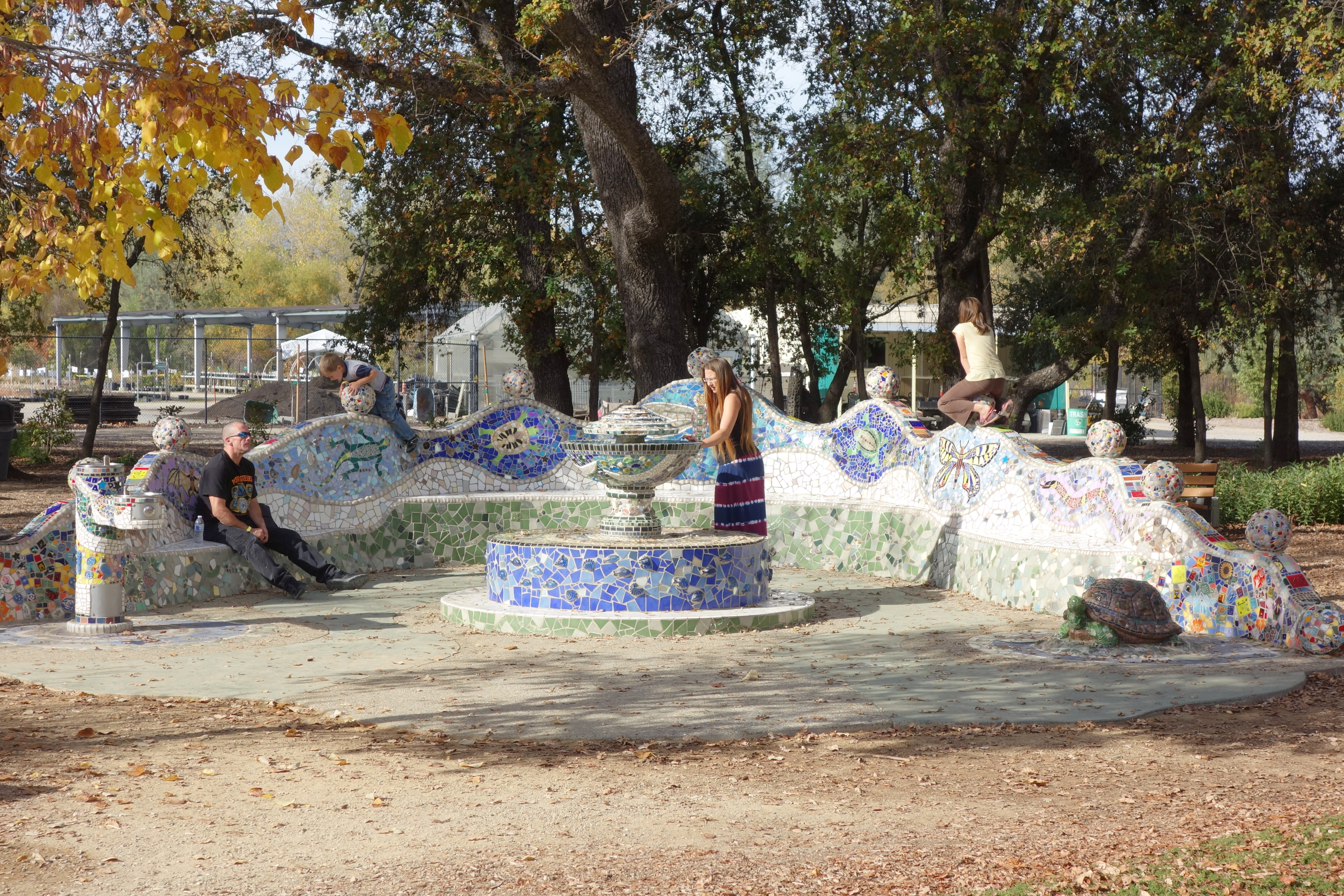

== See also ==
- List of botanical gardens in the United States
- Sequoia Park Zoo
