= Christchurch mosque shootings copycat crimes =

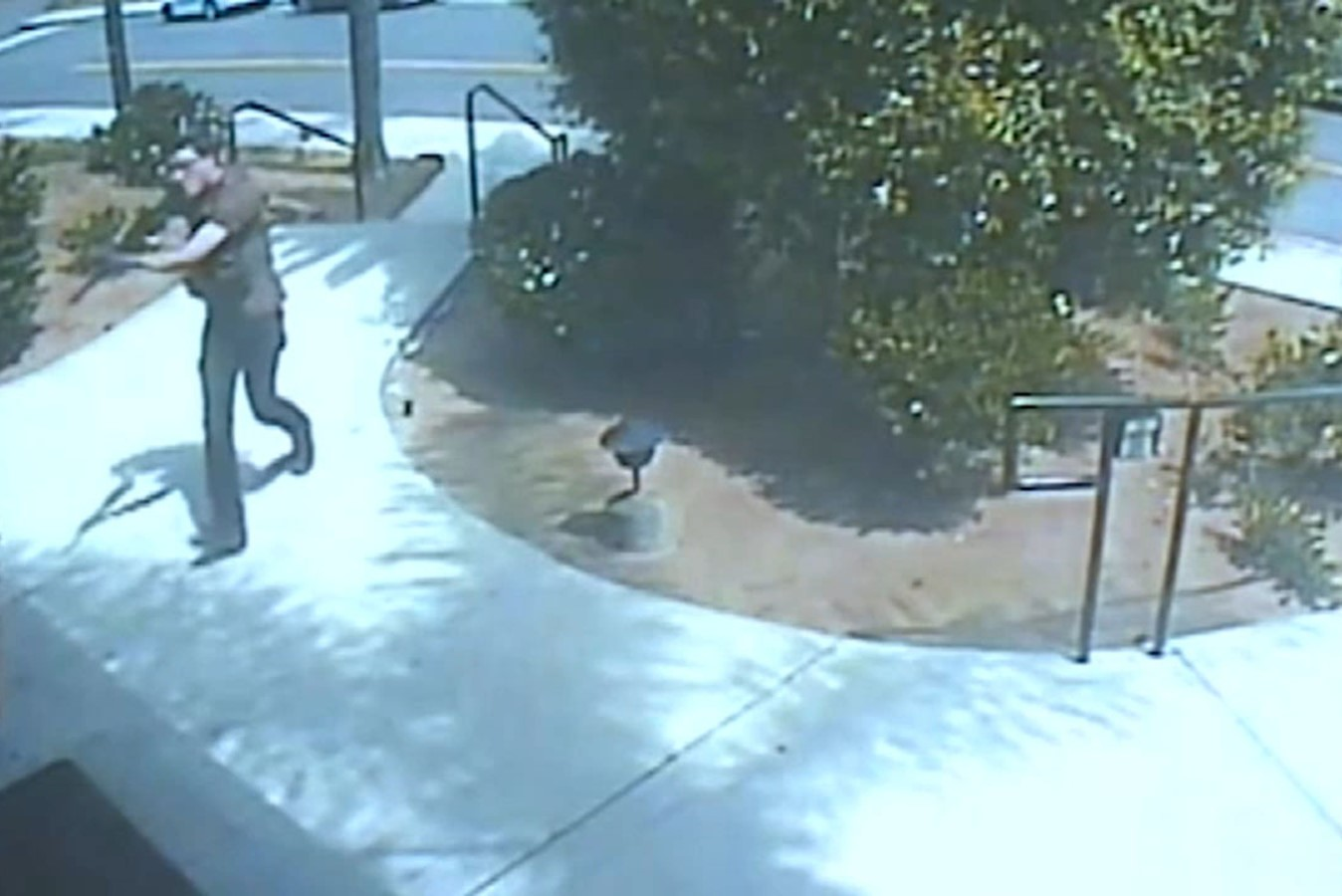
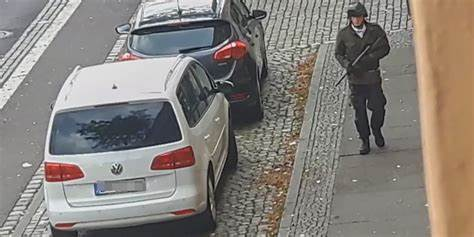
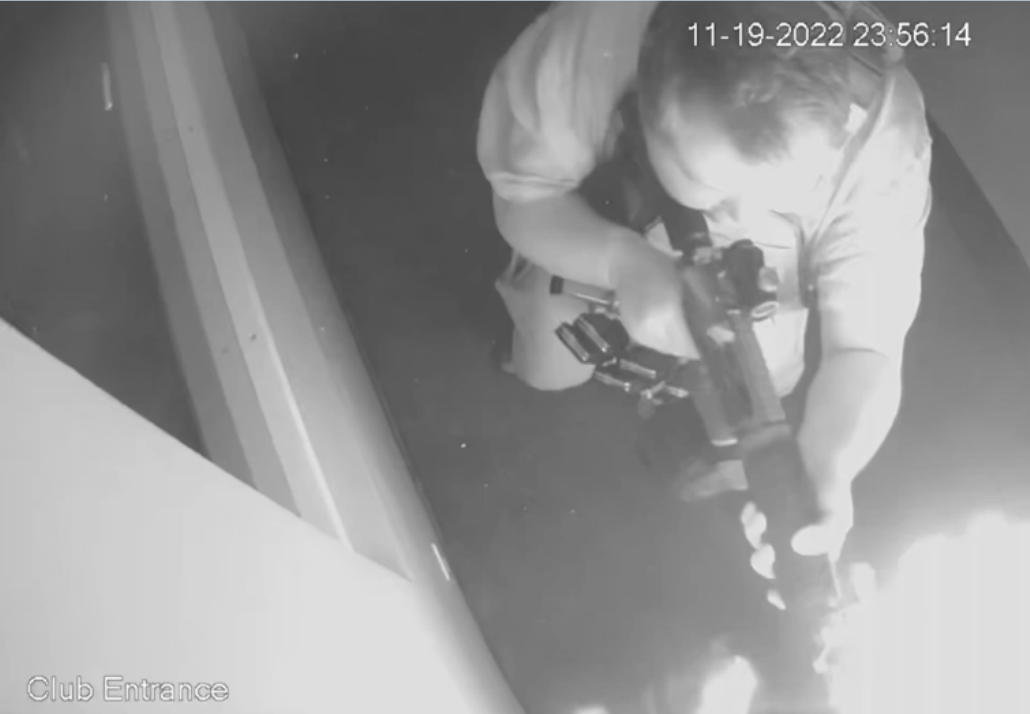
Clockwise from top left: CCTV footage of the 2019 Poway synagogue shooting; CCTV footage of the 2019 El Paso Walmart shooting; Bystander footage of the 2019 Halle synagogue shooting; CCTV footage of the 2022 Club Q shooting; all of which were inspired by the Christchurch mosque shootings and collectively left 31 dead and 54 injured

On 15 March 2019, consecutive terrorist mass shootings took place at two mosques in Christchurch, New Zealand, carried out by Australian Brenton Harrison Tarrant. In total, 51 people were killed while another 89 were injured (40 by direct gunfire). Tarrant, who was found to have been motivated by Islamophobia, white supremacy, and belief in the white genocide conspiracy theory, was later sentenced to 52 consecutive life sentences without the possibility of parole, plus 480 years.

The attack was one of the deadliest of its kind ever carried out by a lone perpetrator. It has had a lasting impact and legacy across Oceania and the wider world, mostly attributed to the perpetrator's thorough planning of the event (leading to a high death toll), his carefully-curated ideological manifesto, and the livestreamed nature of the initial shooting, which made it easy for graphic footage of the rampage to be shared and glorified online. As such, many murderous incidents and plots have been inspired by the attack, either directly or indirectly.

In each of the first five years following the shootings, there was at least one copycat attack directly inspired by the events of Christchurch. Perpetrators often replicate the shooting's defining characteristics, such as pre-planned manifestos motivated by a far-right accelerationist ideology, attempts to livestream their rampage, and writings on firearms, similar to how Tarrant wrote the names of numerous far-right movements and killers on the weapons he used in the attacks. Terrorgram, which is considered an online terrorist group in a handful of countries (including New Zealand, where the Christchurch shootings occurred), formed in the late 2010s and early 2020s as an indirect consequence of the shooting. The group promotes Tarrant and his copycats as saints, urging other accelerationists to mimic Tarrant's crime.

The attack was also used by both far-right terrorists and the Islamic State to call for attacks on the other side. The attack featured in Islamic State propaganda with Abu Hassan al-Muhajir calling for attacks on the "nations of the Cross and the apostate" in retaliation for the attack.

== List ==
=== Copycat incidents ===
Date	Location	Attacker(s)	Dead	Injured	Description
16 March 2019	Stanwell, United Kingdom	Vincent Fuller	0	1	A 50-year-old man smashed the windows of multiple cars whilst carrying a baseball bat and kitchen knife, with the intent of killing as many Muslims as possible. He stabbed a 19-year-old Bulgarian man (who he had mistakenly identified as a Muslim) before being arrested by responding police forces. Just before the spree, he had made a post on Facebook praising the Christchurch gunman, and a video excerpt of the shooting's livestream was found on his phone.
24 March 2019	Escondido, United States	John Timothy Earnest	0	0	Escondido mosque fire: A mosque was purposefully lit on fire by a then-unidentified 19-year-old assailant who also vandalized it, writing "For Brenton Tarrant -t. /pol/" on its parking lot.
27 April 2019	Poway, United States	John Timothy Earnest	1	3	2019 Poway synagogue shooting: The same attacker later perpetrated a mass shooting at a synagogue at a nearby city, during which his rifle jammed. He fled the area, but was later arrested, identified as the perpetrator of both attacks, and sentenced to life imprisonment without the possibility of parole.
3 August 2019	El Paso, United States	Patrick Wood Crusius	23	22	2019 El Paso Walmart shooting: A 21-year-old man shot up a Walmart, targeting people of Hispanic descent. In a manifesto posted shortly before the massacre, he praised Tarrant's attack, citing him as an inspiration. He was later sentenced to 90 consecutive life sentences without the possibility of parole. The attack is the deadliest mass shooting in American history in which the perpetrator was caught alive.
10 August 2019	Bærum, Norway	Philip Manshaus	1	2 (including the perpetrator)	2019 Bærum murder and mosque attack: After shooting his ethnically Chinese adopted sister, the attacker drove to a nearby mosque, where he attempted to carry out and livestream a mass shooting. He was subdued by a would-be victim and arrested, later being sentenced to 21 years' imprisonment. It was later revealed Manshaus was deeply inspired by Tarrant's manifesto, which he viewed as a call to take action.
13 August 2019	Sydney, Australia	Mert Ney	1	1	2019 Sydney CBD stabbings: Mert Ney, who murdered one person and injured another, was known to possess the video of Christchurch mosque shootings and had an obsession with Brenton Tarrant.
9 October 2019	Halle and Landsberg, Germany	Stephan Balliet	2	3 (including the perpetrator)	2019 Halle synagogue shooting: A 27-year-old white supremacist and neo-Nazi livestreamed himself attempting to break into a synagogue with a cache of improvised firearms and explosive devices. Upon failing to breach the institution, he instead shot at a kebab shop nearby, along with random civilians and police. He was arrested after a car chase in which he was shot and injured by police, and later sentenced to life imprisonment. In court, Balliet claimed to have been "inspired" by Brenton Tarrant.
6 June 2021	London, Canada	Nathaniel Veltman	4	1	2021 London, Ontario truck attack: Vehicle-ramming attack targeting Muslims. The attacker, who was found to have been inspired by the manifestos of the perpetrators of the Christchurch shooting along with the 2011 Norway attacks, was later sentenced to five life sentences, with the possibility of parole after 25 years.
19 August 2021	Eslöv, Sweden	Hugo Jackson	0	1	2021 Eslöv school stabbing: A 15-year-old student livestreamed a school attack, during which he stabbed his own teacher. When police arrived, he pointed an airsoft gun at them with the hope of them shooting him dead. At the beginning of the livestream, he had told the audience "Remember lads, subscribe to PewDiePie", a phrase also used by the Christchurch gunman shortly before his attack, which the student had also reportedly praised online. He was later sentenced to two and a half years in a youth detention center.
14 May 2022	Buffalo, United States	Payton S. Gendron	10	3	2022 Buffalo shooting: Mass shooting targeting African Americans perpetrated by an 18-year-old. In an online diary published on Discord, the perpetrator planned out the attack for months and praised the Christchurch massacre.
6 July 2022	Visby, Sweden	Theodor Engström	1	0	Killing of Ing-Marie Wieselgren: A female murder occurred in the city of Visby, where the perpetrator, identified as Theodor Engström, killed Wieselgren. According to the investigation, his motives were against psychiatrists, personal revenge, and Nazi political ideology. He had also been planning to commit the mass attack with knives and was inspired by Brenton Tarrant and Anders Breivik.
26 September 2022	Barreiras, Brazil	I.S.C.	1	1 (the perpetrator)	2022 Barreiras school attack: School shooting carried out by an anonymous 14-year-old student. The attacker had praised Tarrant and Patrick Crusius (see above) in a manifesto published online hours before the attack. He was shot, injured, and arrested by responding police officers.
12 October 2022	Bratislava, Slovakia	Juraj Krajčík	3 (including the perpetrator)	1	2022 Bratislava shooting: A 19-year-old man attacked a gay bar in a homophobic and transphobic attack. He committed suicide the next day. He was found to have begun his planning shortly after the Christchurch attack, which he saw as an inspiration.
19–20 November 2022	Colorado Springs, United States	Anderson Lee Aldrich	5	26 (including the perpetrator)	2022 Colorado Springs nightclub shooting: An anti-LGBTQ mass shooting was carried out at a gay bar by a 22-year-old. He was later sentenced to a total of 60 life sentences without the possibility of parole. Aldrich was also found to have been hosting a website which praised the Christchurch gunman.
16 August 2023	Jacksonville, United States	Ryan Christopher Palmeter	4 (including the perpetrator)	0	2023 Jacksonville shooting: A 21-year-old man carried out a mass shooting targeting African Americans at a Dollar General store before committing suicide. In his self-published manifesto, he extensively wrote about the perpetrator of the Christchurch shootings, calling him a "main inspiration".
2 April 2024	Smite, United Kingdom	Callum Parslow	0	1	A 32-year-old man entered a Pear Tree Inn hotel in Smite with a knife and stabbed Nahom Hagos, a man from Eritrea. He then attempted to commit a mass stabbing but failed. On Thursday, he claimed to have been inspired by Brenton Tarrant and Anders Breivik, and also had Brenton Tarrant's manifesto on his cell phone. He published his own manifesto on his Twitter account.
26 June 2024	Newcastle, Australia	Jordan Patten (accused)	0	0	A 19-year-old allegedly uploaded a 205-page manifesto, citing the 2019 Christchurch mosque shooter as an inspiration before allegedly livestreaming himself approaching politician Tim Crakanthorp's workplace with a kitchen knife in an supposed assassination plot. He ultimately backed out of his alleged plan at the last minute, turning himself into police when they arrived. In November 2025, he pleaded not guilty to terrorism charges.
26 June 2024	Sydney, Australia	Unnamed 14-year-old (accused)	0	1	A 14-year-old boy stabbed a 22-year-old man at a Sydney university. According to the investigation, the young man planned a "Christchurch-style" attack. He arrived at the scene dressed in a military uniform with a fisherman's hat and carrying a knife.
12 August 2024	Eskişehir, Turkey	Arda Küçükyetim	0	5	2024 Eskişehir stabbing: Mass stabbing carried out by an 18-year-old. In his self-published manifesto, Küçükyetim expressed deep feelings of misanthropy and praised the Chirstchurch attacks, along with various others mass killings. He was later sentenced to over 75 years' imprisonment and committed suicide in June 2026, while in custody.
22 January 2025	Nashville, US	Solomon Henderson	2 (including the perpetrator)	2	2025 Antioch High School shooting: 17-year-old Solomon Henderson shot two students, killing one, before taking his own life. Another student was injured by a fall. In his writings, Henderson expressed praise for and included photos of various mass murderers, including Tarrant.
26 April 2025	Leeds, United Kingdom	Owen Lawrence	1 (the perpetrator)	2	Otley Run pub crawl attack: A man attacked pubgoers at random with various airguns, a crossbow, and homemade shanks before committing suicide by shooting himself in the head with an airgun. Online, he had praised various mass killers, including, The Columbine shooters, Randy Stair, and Brenton Tarrant.
24 August 2025	Kampen, Oslo, Norway	Djordje Wilms	1	0	Killing of Tamima Nibras Juhar: A 34-year-old Norwegian–Ethiopian Muslim woman, was killed in a racist and islamophobia-motivated murder on 24 August 2025 in Oslo, Norway. The murder took place at a child welfare centre. The suspect stated that he was inspired by Brenton Tarrant, Anders Breivik and Phillip Manshaus.
27 August 2025	Minneapolis, United States	Robin M. Westman	3 (including the perpetrator)	30	2025 Annunciation Catholic Church shooting: A 23-year-old attacked a scheduled school-wide Mass before committing suicide. The perpetrator had written various far-right and white supremacist slogans on their firearms, much in the same way Tarrant did. Among the writing on the guns were phrases referencing the Christchurch shooting, including: "Brenton 4 Ever", "51" (in reference to the 51 people killed in Christchurch), "Hail Breivik Hail Brenton", and "Hello Brother" (words uttered by a mosque attendee just before Tarrant opened fire, killing him on the scene).
10 September 2025	Colorado, United States	Desmond Holly	1 (the perpetrator)	2	2025 Evergreen High School shooting: 16-year-old Desmond Holly opened fire at Evergreen High School with a .38 caliber revolver, two students were injured before Holly committed suicide. Investigators revealed that Holly was "radicalized" online and adopted extremist and Neo-Nazi views. He referenced and praised multiples far-right mass-shooter online including the Christchurch shooter.
7 November 2025	Jakarta, Indonesia	Muhammed Nazriel Fadhel Hidayat	0	96 (including perpetrator)	2025 Jakarta school bombing: On 7 November 2025, a 17-year-old male student detonated two improvised explosives at SMAN 72 school in Jakarta, Indonesia. He injured 95 people and was wounded himself by currently unknown means. It is also known that the boy had neo-Nazi scribbles and text on his unused weapons, including those of Brenton Tarrant, Luca Traini, Alexandre Bissonnette, and a phrase with the text "FOR AGARTHA." He also believed in Agartha.
16 December 2025	Gorki-2, Odintsovsky District, Russia	Timofey Vladimirovich Kulyamov	1	3	2025 Odintsovo school attack: A 15-year-old male student attacked fellow students and school staff with a knife and pepper spray, killing a 10-year-old pupil of Tajik descent. Many selfies he posted prior to the attack revealed an obsession with previous mass attacks, including the Christchurch attack, along with the Graz school shooting and Columbine massacre.
3 February 2026	Sungai Raya, Indonesia	Unnamed 15 year old male	0	1	2026 Sungai Raya school bombing: An 15-year-old male he attacked his school with bombs and a knife, injuring a student. After that, the attacker was investigated and found to have a suitcase with the names of Tarrant, Omar Mateen, Elliot Rodger, and Timur Bekmansurov written on it.
18 May 2026	San Diego, United States	Cain Lee Clark and Caleb Liam Vazquez	5 (including both perpetrators)	1	2026 Islamic Center of San Diego shooting: An 18-year-old and a 17-year-old, livestreamed themselves opening fire inside and outside the Islamic Center of San Diego, killing 3. They also injured a landscaper in a drive-by shooting, though the person was not struck by gunfire. One gunman fatally shot the other gunman who asked to be shot, before taking his own life.
29 May 2026	San Vito Lo Capo, Italy	Unnamed 12-year-old	0	0	A 12-year-old student attempted to stab a teacher at a middle school in San Vito Lo Capo, Sicily, while filming the attack in a Telegram group chat. The teacher was unharmed after the attack was stopped when classmates intervened and restrained the student. Investigators found references to several mass killings written on the student's helmet and knives, including "meno 51" ("minus 51"), which Italian media identified as a reference to the 51 victims of the Christchurch shootings. In his messages recovered by police, the student mentioned Tarrant and Gendron, as well as a plan to kill 3 Muslim students and a black girl.
8 July 2026	Schongau, Germany	Unidentified 16-year-old	0	2	A 16-year-old boy attacked two girls at a school, leaving them injured. After the attack. the investigation uncovered his manifesto, in which he identified himself as an incel and espoused incel and far-right ideology. He also cited Tarrant, Adam Lanza, and the 2026 San Cristóbal school shooting as inspiration and admiration. It is also alleged that he attempted to livestream the attack.
18 September 2026	Rome, Italy	Unnamed 13-year-old (accused)	0	1	A 13-year-old student livestreamed himself stabbing a 66-year-old teacher multiple times at Giovanni Verga Middle School. He was inspired by Brenton Tarrant, Anders Breivik, and Timofey Kulyamov, and that he also broadcast his attack on TikTok.
8 October 2026	Leszczydół-Nowiny, Poland	Wiktor Ś. (accused)	1	2	2026 Poland school stabbings: According to Kacper Rekawek, a senior researcher at the International Centre for Counter-Terrorism in The Hague, Netherlands, one of the suspected Polish school attackers used the same imagery and "aesthetics" as Tarrant.
19 October 2026	Bistrița, Romania	Andi	0	3 (including perpetrator)	2026 Bistrița school stabbing: A 13-year-old student stabbed a teacher and a student. After the incident was investigated, his TikTok profile was found to contain content related to the Great Replacement Theory. He had also been inspired by Timofey Kulyamov and Brenton Tarrant.

=== Unsuccessful plots ===
Below are plots inspired by or related to the Christchurch attacks that were foiled before anyone was killed or injured by a would-be perpetrator. Note that the first row lists the date of arrest, though the would-be attackers usually plan for their attack to take place later on.

Date	Location	Plotter	Description
1 November 2020	Sembawang, Singapore	Unidentified 16-year-old	Singapore mosque attacks plot: An Indian Singaporean Protestant youth had plotted to attack a nearby mosque with a machete on the anniversary of the Christchurch attacks. His plot was uncovered in late November 2020 by the Internal Security Department, and he was held in detention in January 2024, after just over three years of being held in custody.
26 May 2022	Derbyshire, United Kingdom	Daniel John Harris	A 19-year-old man was arrested for hate speech charges after spreading neo-Nazi propaganda online which had been consumed and reposted by the perpetrators of the Buffalo and Colorado Springs shootings in the United States (listed above). His phone was found to have montages of the Christchurch shootings, and he had purchased a 3D printer which with he had printed various firearm parts. He was ultimately sentenced to eleven and a half years in prison.
10 February 2025	Republic of Singapore, Singapore	Nick Lee Xing Qiu	An 18-year-old Singaporean man of Chinese descent was planning a mosque shooting and identified himself as an East Asian white supremacist. He used GoreBox as a training for his attack, idolised Brenton Tarrant and consumed Neo-Nazi content from Japan.
20 February 2024	Leeds, United Kingdom	Brogan Stewart, Christopher Ringrose, and Marco Pitzettu	Three self-identified neo-Nazis planned out an attack on a mosque in Leeds, amassing an arsenal of weapons, including knives, crossbows, axes, swords, and a 3D-printed firearm. In their group chats, they were found to have shared the livestream of the Christchurch shooting, along with Tarrant's manifesto. They were sentenced to 11, 10, and 8 years' imprisonment, respectively.
15 March 2024	Vaasa, Finland	Evita Kolmonen	On the fifth anniversary of the Christchurch shooting, a Junior sergeant in the Finnish army was arrested for allegedly planning a mass shooting that day at a university. She said the world needed "a mass culling" to put an end to "selfish individualism", "human degeneration", global warming, and conspicuous consumption. She was later sentenced to three years and two months in prison.
18 December 2024	Tennessee, United States	Gunner Joseph Fisher	A 19-year-old man was arrested immediately before he could carry out his attack. During the arrest and investigation, his manifesto, WHITEBOYSUMMER: 2025, and the videos he recorded were found. His objective was to attack a mosque, a school, and a furry convention. He also admired Brenton Tarrant, Ryan Palmeter, and Adam Lanza, and allegedly planned to livestream his attack.
20 February 2025	Northumberland, United Kingdom	Unidentified 15-year-old	Police found a crossbow and multiple hunting knives at the home of a schoolboy who had been interacting with far-right extremists on Telegram and had researched local synagogues shortly after watching the Christchurch attacks' livestream. He was later sentenced to 3.5 years' imprisonment.
14 May 2025	San Antonio, United States	T.H.	A 13-year-old boy and his mother were arrested after it was found they were plotting a mass shooting at Jeremiah Rhodes Middle School. The boy's mother had gifted him firearms, ammunition, and ballistic gear in exchange for babysitting his siblings. In the boy's possession, authorities found a firework-style homemade bomb on which he had written the name of the Christchurch attacker.
3 November 2025	Buenos Aires, Argentina	Unidentified 16-year-old	A student was found to be in possession of various airsoft guns, knives, and Molotov cocktails, with which he was planning to carry out a school shooting. On his replica weapons, he wrote the names of various mass killers who identified with far-right ideologies, including Tarrant, along with Anders Behring Breivik and Rafael Solich.
13 March 2026	Auckland, New Zealand	Unidentified 20-year-old	A man sent emails threatening multiple universities and police stations, threatening to commit the deadliest mass shooting in New Zealand history. After his arrest, he was found to have been possessing a 12-gauge pump-action shotgun, a machete, and a digital copy of Brenton Tarrant's manifesto. The man also allegedly subscribed to a far-right ideology.
18 March 2026	Valley City, United States	Wyatt James Brzoska (accused)	A 20-year-old man was arrested for allegedly planning a mass shooting at an Ohio mosque. The man had posted content related to Neo-Nazi ideology and repeatedly referencing Tarrant online.
30 March 2026	Perugia, Italy	Unidentified 17-year-old	A 17-year-old teenager was arrested with terrorism charges after he had threatened to shoot up a school "Columbine-Style". Authorities found manuals for explosives and weapons, along with videos and neonazi propaganda that idolized Tarrant and Breivik.
28 May 2026	Maryborough, Australia	Unidentified 13-year-old	A 13-year-old allegedly went to a BP service station with the intention of killing children there, then reportedly tried to steal a car to travel to a primary school and carry the attack out. Video of the Christchurch attack was found on his computer.
15 July 2026	London, United Kingdom	Unidentified 14-year-old	A 14-year-old boy was arrested for racially aggravated damage to property after he smashed the window of a car belonging to a black woman. He was later given terrorist charges after police discovered his plans to attack two mosques in Sutton on 28 August. He had additionally written a manifesto inspired by Tarrant, Anders Behring Breivik, and Adolf Hitler.

== Other connected incidents ==
=== Threats ===
- On 16 March 2019, a 24-year-old man from Oldham, United Kingdom, was arrested for sending Facebook posts in support of the shootings.
- On 19 March 2019, an Australian man who had posted on social media praising the shootings was indicted on one count of aggravated possession of a firearm without a licence and four counts of using or possessing a prohibited weapon. He was released on bail on the condition that he stay offline. The man pleaded guilty in Magistrates Court to four counts of possessing a prohibited weapon.
- On 4 April 2019, Thomas Bolin, a 22-year-old living in United States, sent Facebook messages praising the shootings and discussing a desire to carry out a similar act in the United States with his cousin. Bolin was later convicted of lying to the FBI for claiming he did not possess any firearms.
- On 4 March 2020, a 19-year-old Christchurch man was arrested for allegedly making a terror threat against the Al Noor Mosque on an encrypted social media platform Telegram. Media reports subsequently identified the man as Sam Brittenden, a member of the white supremacist group Action Zealandia.
- On 4 March 2021, a 27-year-old man was charged with "threatening to kill" after making an online threat against both the Linwood Islamic Centre and the Al Noor Mosque on 4chan. The suspect was granted name suppression and remanded into custody until 19 March.
- On 4 March 2025, Western Australia Police arrested a 16-year-old boy in Eaton, Australia after he allegedly made an online threat against the newly opened Sydney Islamic House mosque. The boy had published a comment under a post on the mosque's Instagram profile referencing the Christchurch shootings. The New South Wales Police's Liverpool City Police Area Command also commenced an investigation and confirmed there were no "ongoing threats to the community." Meta Platforms apologised after Instagram initially dismissed the complaint, attributing it to a technical error. The boy was charged with "creating a false impression about the existence of threats or danger." The teenager had also published posts with references to White supremacy and homophobia. He appeared in the Bunbury Children's Court where he accepted full responsibility and was referred to a diversionary programme for countering violent extremism.

=== Retaliation ===
- According to Sri Lankan State Defence Minister Ruwan Wijewardene, an early inquiry indicated that the 2019 Sri Lanka Easter bombings on 21 April were retaliation for the Christchurch attack. Some analysts believe the attacks were planned before the Christchurch attack, and any linkage was questioned by New Zealand's government—with Prime Minister Ardern saying she was not aware of any intelligence linking the two.
- One of the weapons used in the 2019 Utrecht tram shooting had writings referring to Islam written all over it, apparently imitating Brenton Tarrant's weapons. He also referred to the killings of Muslims abroad, possibly referring to the Christchurch shooting.

== See also ==
- Columbine High School massacre copycat crimes
- Isla Vista attacks copycat crimes
- Ecofascism § Association with violence
- Far-right terrorism
- Livestreamed crime
- Mass shooting contagion
- Militant accelerationism
- Terrorgram
- True Crime Community
