= 2026 Islamic Center of San Diego shooting =

Shooting in San Diego, California, US

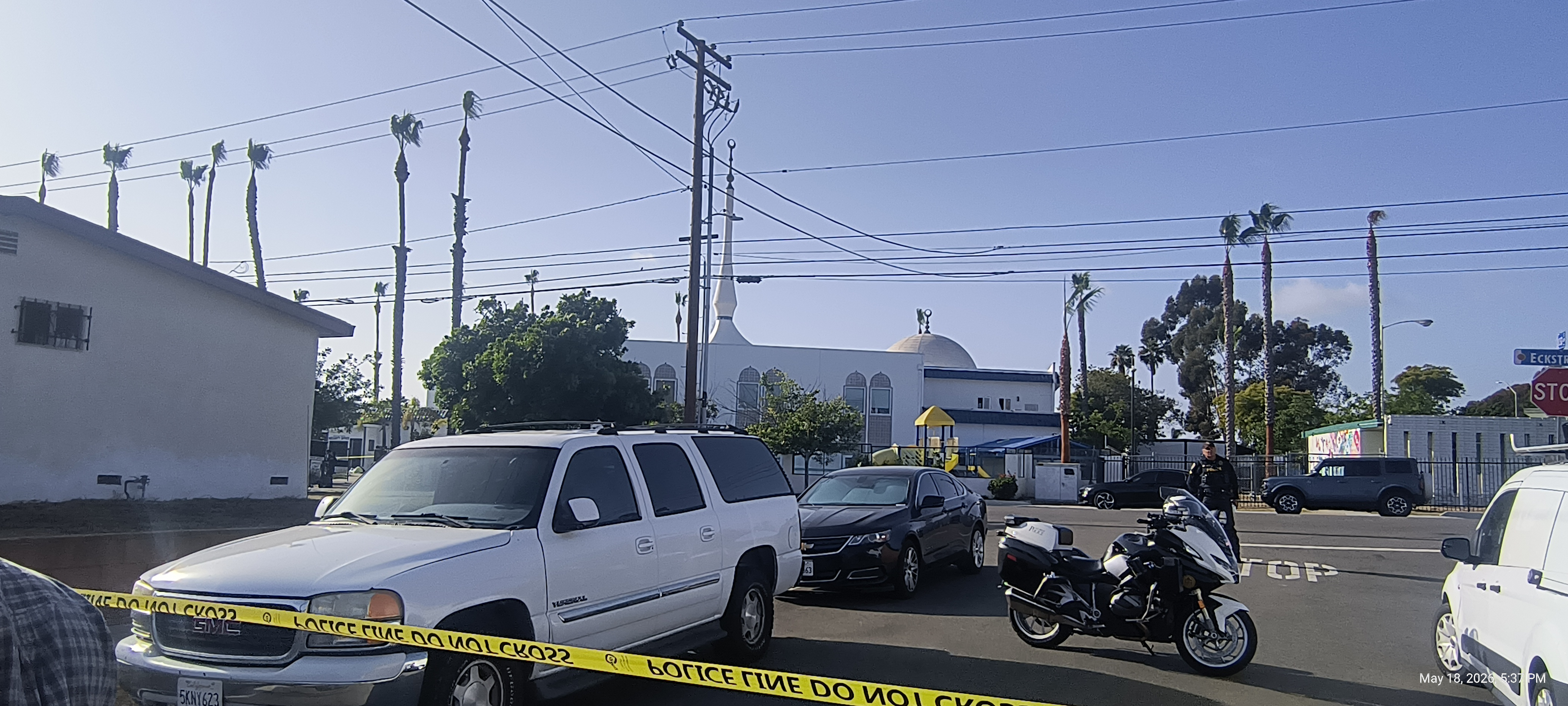
- The mosque a few hours after the shooting
- Location: 32.8205°N 117.1655°W; Islamic Center of San Diego; Clairemont, San Diego, California, US
- Date: May 18, 2026; 6 months ago 11:42 a.m. – 12:03 p.m. (PDT; UTC−07:00)
- Attack type: Hate crime; school shooting; drive-by shooting; shootout; murder–suicide
- Weapons: Ruger Mini-14 semi-automatic rifle; Handgun; Pump-action shotgun
- Deaths: 5 (including both perpetrators)
- Injuries: 1 (Note: Sources differ on whether a landscaper the pair shot at was struck by a bullet or not.)
- Perpetrators: Cain Clark and Caleb Vazquez
- Defender: Amin Abdullah
- Motive: White supremacy; Neo-Nazi accelerationism; Nihilistic violent extremism; Christchurch mosque shootings copycat crime
- Accused: Sarah Lindsay Santiago
- Charges: Murder by abetting (3 counts); Conspiracy (1 count)

On May 18, 2026, a shooting occurred at the Islamic Center of San Diego (ICSD), the largest mosque in San Diego, California, United States. Two gunmen, 17-year-old Cain Lee Clark and 18-year-old Caleb Liam Vazquez, fatally shot a security guard and two community members outside the mosque before fleeing. Subsequently, they shot at a landscaper in a drive-by shooting and committed suicide via gunshot in a nearby neighborhood. They had originally planned other shootings.

Clark and Vazquez recorded a live video of the shooting in a Discord call, along with a racist, Islamophobic, and antisemitic manifesto that appeared to have been written by them was found online during investigation. The manifesto referenced the Christchurch mosque shootings and included significant references to Neo-Nazi and white nationalist symbols. Authorities said the incident is being investigated as a hate crime. On August 31, 2026, Sarah Lindsay Santiago, a 17-year-old girl from North Carolina, was charged with murder for allegedly aiding Clark and Vazquez in the shooting.

== Background ==
The Islamic Center of San Diego is located in the Clairemont Mesa East neighborhood of San Diego, California. It opened in 1989 and is the largest mosque in San Diego County. The facility houses the lower campus, pre-K to third grade, of Bright Horizon Academy, a pre-K to 12th grade school that was formerly named the Islamic School of San Diego.

The Council on American–Islamic Relations (CAIR) said in a statement that the shooting occurred amid record high complaints of bias and discrimination against Muslims. CAIR recorded its highest annual number of complaints in 2025 since beginning such reporting in 1996. The mosque increased its security after a hate-related incident in 2022.

== Events ==
=== Before the shootings ===
According to a wrongful death lawsuit filed by the mother of one of the perpetrators, on May 17 at 8:24 p.m., video surveillance showed her son leaving a mental health facility that he had been admitted into on the previous month. The surveillance footage showed him pacing back and forth inside the facility while on the phone. It is unclear if he was allowed to leave or whether any facility rules were broken. According to a preliminary timeline released by the San Diego Police Department (SDPD), they first received a 911 call from the mother of the second perpetrator at 9:42 a.m. on May 18. She said her son was missing, was suicidal, and was last seen wearing camo and voluntarily leaving the home with an online acquaintance at 6:24 a.m. According to her, they left in her son's car, a white 2018 BMW X1, and a firearm was missing. Based on the information of this call, SDPD classified the incident as a runaway juvenile call.

At 10:41 a.m., the mother called again to report that additional firearms were missing, that she believed her son took them, and that she discovered a suicide note and threatening, hate-filled writings on her son's computer. Police Chief Scott Wahl said three weapons in total were stolen. As a result, at 10:50 a.m., SDPD upgraded the call to a higher priority due to the potential for acts of violence. They entered the BMW's license plate to their License Plate Reader system at 11:06 a.m. and investigated a hit in the Mission Valley area four minutes later. Meanwhile, according to the parents of the first perpetrator, they were not aware that their son had left the mental health facility until hours before the shooting, when the program director inquired the mother about the perpetrator's whereabouts. The parents reportedly spent "a couple of hours" driving around the area in search of their son, and they attempted to speak with facility staff but were unable to do so, eventually leaving the building at around 11:50 a.m. The mother called SDPD, but her son was already with his accomplice at that time.

1 Location of mosque
2 Shooting of landscaper
3 Location of suicides

=== Shootings ===
At 11:42 a.m., police received calls about shots being fired at the ICSD. Amin Abdullah, a security guard, engaged and struck one of the shooters in gunfire outside the mosque and radioed those inside the building to enter lockdown. According to The Washington Post, this likely bought time for the teachers and 140 students inside the building to prepare and hide from the shooters. Wahl said that the shooters entered the mosque after killing Abdullah and moved room to room. The shooters were then lured out of the building by two men who called 911; the two men were unable to flee and were cornered and killed by the shooters.

The police arrived at the mosque at 11:46 a.m., where they found the three victims in the parking lot. At around 11:48 a.m., two gunmen carried out a drive-by shooting at the 7100 block of Salerno Street, a couple of blocks away from the ICSD. They targeted a landscaper and yelled before fleeing, according to a witness. (Note: Several rounds were fired towards Letuli. Sources differ on whether Letuli's injury was due to a bullet strike. According to Letuli through his lawyer, a bullet fragment, from the bullet that shattered his helmet, injured Letuli, causing him to bleed. According to the preliminary SDPD timeline, he was struck and suffered minor injuries including a bleeding forehead. Wahl said during a press conference that Letuli was shot at but not struck by gunfire.) At 11:52 a.m., police received another call notifying them about the drive-by shooting. At 12:03 p.m., the two gunmen were found deceased in the BMW at the 3800 block of Hatton Street, nearly 0.3 miles (0.48 km) from the mosque. One gunman had shot the other twice in the head inside of the car and then killed himself. No officers fired shots.

Bomb technicians cleared the vehicle where the suspects were found dead. The Islamic Center of San Diego's imam said that teachers, students, and school staff members were safely evacuated. At 1:07 p.m., police confirmed via X that the threat was neutralized. According to authorities in North Carolina on August 31, the two gunmen had planned to next target the Kehilat Ariel Messianic Synagogue, located about 1.5 miles (2.4 km) from the ICSD, as well as Black students at a local high school. According to federal law enforcement officials, the gunmen may have stopped due to one of them being wounded by Abdullah.

=== Response ===
The mayor of San Diego, Todd Gloria, was briefed on the shooting, along with the head of the FBI in San Diego. President Donald Trump and Governor of California Gavin Newsom also received briefings. The New York City Police Department announced the deployment of more officers to mosques across New York City "out of an abundance of caution".

== Victims ==
Both San Diego Police and the mosque's imam said that one security guard and two mosque community members were shot and found dead outside the mosque. The victims were identified as security guard Amin Abdullah, aged 51; a neighbor that lived across the street named Nadir Awad, aged 57; and Mansour Kaziha, a 78-year-old caretaker of Syrian origin known as Abu Ezz who had worked at the mosque since it was built in the 1980s. The chairman of the mosque's board of directors, Ahmed Shabaik, told Al Jazeera all three men had played a role in responding to the assailants. Tafu Letuli, a 52-year-old landscaper targeted in a drive-by shooting by the perpetrators, was injured by fragments and is recovering according to his lawyer. Letuli is a native of American Samoa and has a wife and three children.

San Diego police chief Scott Wahl said that Abdullah's actions were heroic and he was "pivotal" in preventing more bloodshed. Sheikh Uthman ibn Farooq, who had spoken with Abdullah's son, said that "he wanted to defend the innocent, so he decided to become a security guard."

== Perpetrators ==
Law enforcement identified the deceased male shooters as 17-year-old Cain Lee Clark of San Diego and 18-year-old Caleb Liam Vazquez of Chula Vista; both were found dead inside a vehicle. According to police, they were radicalized online, where they met and later realized that they both lived in the San Diego area.

=== Cain Lee Clark ===
Cain Lee Clark (July 10, 2008 – May 18, 2026) lived in the Clairemont neighborhood of San Diego throughout his life and attended virtual classes at James Madison High School. Clark's family told The San Diego Union-Tribune that they have been living in Clairemont since 2004. Clark's father was a disc jockey and an author of a five-part comic series that tells a story about a misunderstood boy being faced with eliminating newfound friends to break a curse, according to online book reviews. A spokesman for the San Diego Unified School District said that Clark had been attending iHigh Virtual Academy, the district's online-only school, since 2021 and was set to graduate a few weeks after the attack. He participated in the wrestling team of local James Madison High School during his first three years of high school at iHigh. Longtime neighbors spoke to KABC-TV, replying that they last saw Clark a few hours before the shooting. They described his family as good neighbors.

Prior to the shootings, Clark wrote a multi-page manifesto where he described himself as a Christian ecofascist accelerationist and describes how he was frequently bullied and never found love at school. The Los Angeles Times found social media accounts under usernames that Clark identified as his, which showed school shootings as video games and profile photos depicting the user dressed in camouflage with Nazi emblems and a grimacing skull mask with a Confederate flag in the background. In an image uploaded in April, Clark showed the book Siege, described by the LA Times as "a collection of essays by a militant neo-Nazi who advocated 'lone wolf' terrorism in the cause of white revolution." Other accounts showed him using the phrase "groyper"; images from Zero Day, a film about a school shooting; videos of him flashing the OK gesture, a sign used by white nationalists; and a picture of a younger Clark with a computer-generated blond wig and the mythical Aryan world of Agartha in the background.

=== Caleb Liam Vazquez ===
Caleb Liam Vazquez (July 2, 2007 – May 18, 2026) lived in the Eastlake Trails neighborhood of Chula Vista throughout his life. Vazquez's family had been living in Eastlake Trails since 2008, and he grew up attending Washington Elementary School in San Diego's Little Italy neighborhood. He later graduated from High Tech High Chula Vista. Neighbors said Vazquez's family had lived there for years and described them as nice people. Vazquez's family said that he was on the autism spectrum.

In January 2025, the Chula Vista Police Department spoke with Vazquez after a friend reported him to a school official, saying that Vazquez warned him not to come to school the next day, and the official then contacted police. The school advised police that Vazquez was interested in "extremist ideology and mass-casualty attacks" and that they had already "conducted multiple threat assessments and wellness checks" on him for previous troubling behaviors. He was subsequently placed under a "5150 hold" that same year. A restraining order was placed on Vazquez in January 2025, and it was dismissed in March 2025. Vazquez's parents voluntarily stored 26 weapons (including several rifles, three Glock handguns and a 12-gauge Mossberg shotgun) with a licensed gun dealer, and police sought an emergency court order to seize them. However, the family and police agreed to dismiss the matter in mid-February, and the order was dissolved.

According to his parents, Vazquez had been undergoing mental health treatment in the days before the shooting, having made repeated voluntary trips to rehabilitation treatment centers. According to a wrongful death lawsuit filed by Vazquez's mother against a mental health provider on August 31, Vazquez had been living in a mental health facility in San Diego's North Park neighborhood from April 28 to May 17, the day before the shooting. He had been receiving treatment for several mental health conditions, including depression and psychotic episodes. On May 14, during his stay, the FBI warned Vazquez's mother that her son was using the dark web and discussing suicides and school shootings with people; she shared the warning with her son's therapist and a program director the next day.

== Investigation ==
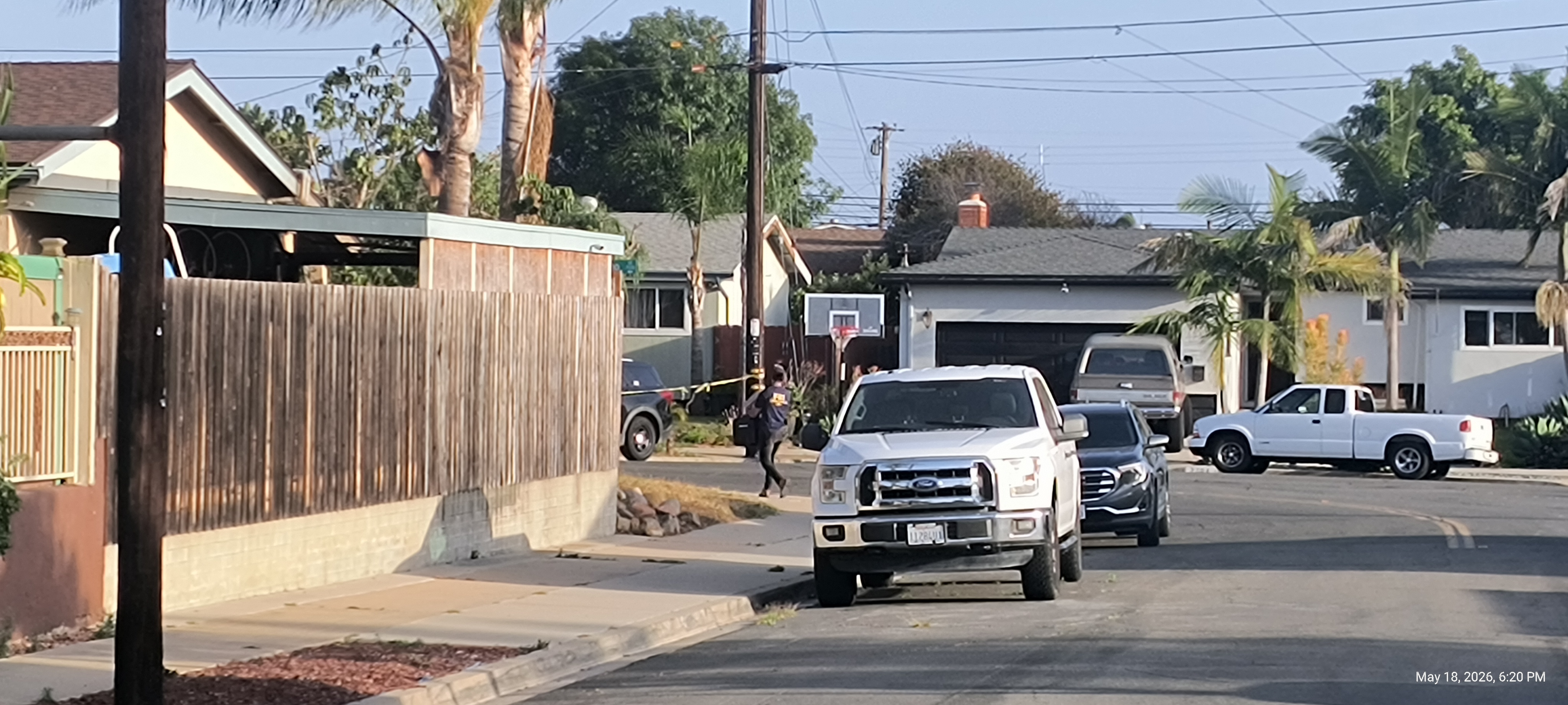
FBI Evidence Response Team gathering evidence in response to the shooting

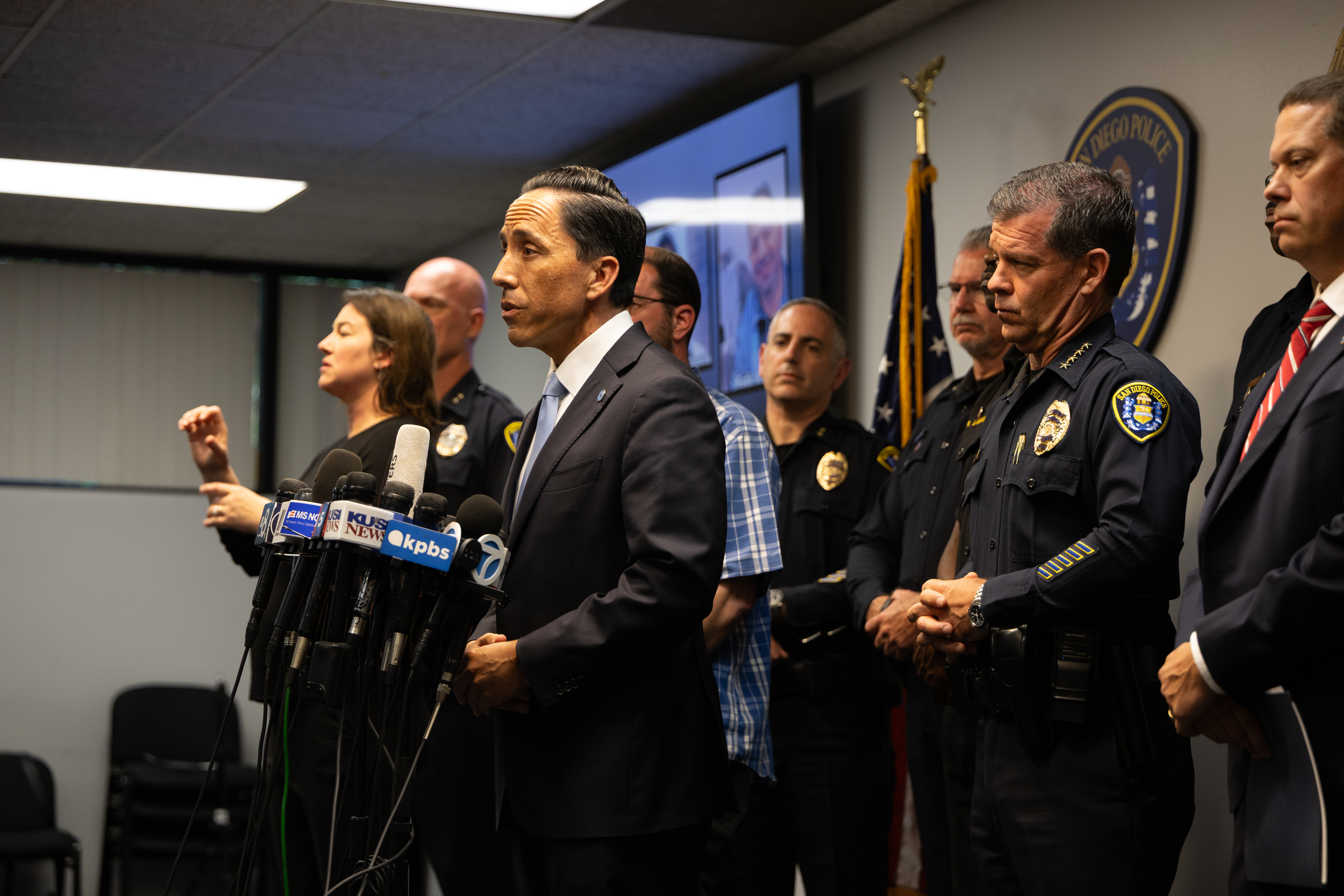
Press briefing on May 19 by the San Diego Police

The Federal Bureau of Investigation assisted law enforcement in San Diego with the investigation into the shooting. Authorities searched three homes associated with the shooters; "numerous" firearms were seized as part of their investigation, including crossbows, pistols, rifles, and shotguns, as well as ammunition and tactical gear.

Authorities said the incident is being investigated as a hate crime. According to The New York Times, two law enforcement officials said investigators discovered anti-Islamic writing in the vehicle where the perpetrators were found dead. The officials said one of the shooters took a firearm from his parents' house and left a suicide note. CNN reported that the suicide note contained writings about racism. The Los Angeles Times identified social media accounts believed to be used by one of the shooters which idolized the white nationalism movement and neo-Nazi terrorism.

On May 22, the Los Angeles Times reported on the San Diego Police Department (SDPD)'s staffing shortages and budget deficit, which had been issues of debate in the city leading up to the shooting. As recently as March, the staffing shortages led to an average response time of more than two hours for lower-priority calls like the initial call made by the mother of one of the perpetrators. SDPD's northern division, where the shooting occurred, had only seven officers assigned to work in the area at the time, representing half of the division's minimum staffing level. According to an SDPD spokesperson, almost every shift has been short-staffed since COVID and a wave of retirements reduced the department by about 200 officers.

The Institute for Strategic Dialogue found that the shooters were primarily motivated by neo-Nazi accelerationism and white supremacy, with a broader influence from nihilistic extremist online subcultures.

=== Livestream and manifesto ===
The shooters shared a livestreamed video during the shooting and a 75-page manifesto purportedly written by the shooters was later found online. A CBS News analysis of the footage indicated that at least three people watched the livestream in real time. One of them, apparently an individual in the Eastern Time Zone at the time, was in contact with the shooters via a Signal video call before and during the shooting; she appeared to have been in an online relationship with one of the shooters. One viewer urged another to call the police, but it was unclear if anyone did. One of the viewers of the Signal video call used Discord to allow another individual, possibly in Albania, to view the livestream of the shooting while it was occurring. On August 31, 2026, a 17-year-old female, Sarah Lindsay Santiago, was indicted by a grand jury in North Carolina for allegedly agreeing, prior to the San Diego shooting, to record the shooters' livestream and publish it and their manifesto online. She was arrested the week before her indictment and faces three charges of murder by abetting and one charge of conspiracy.

Analysts of the footage identified a Sonnenrad patch on the plate carrier believed to be worn by Clark and a flag with a Sonnenrad on it was found at the scene. The Washington Post reported that the video showed a swastika and the phrase "Race War Now" scrawled on a pistol used in the shooting. Investigators found a fuel container at the scene with a Schutzstaffel (SS) insignia drawn on it and video analysts reported seeing similar SS bolts drawn onto one of the firearms.

The manifesto espoused Islamophobia, antisemitism, anti-Black racism, militant accelerationism, homophobia, transphobia, Hispanophobia, misogyny, nihilistic violent extremism, misanthropy, incel ideology, and anti-Donald Trump sentiment. They detailed their inspiration from the ecofascist perpetrator of the Christchurch mosque shootings, calling for more copycat attacks. They additionally praised the perpetrators of several other mass shootings and terrorist attacks, suggesting links to the True Crime Community (TCC), an online fandom interested in high-profile mass killers. The shooters also expressed support for various militant accelerationist groups, including the Atomwaffen Division, Terrorgram and The Base The manifesto contains various neo-Nazi symbols, including the Sonnenrad, Celtic cross, Kolovrat, swastikas, and Atomwaffen Division logos. The text also references the perpetrators of the Pulse nightclub shooting, the 2025 Bondi Beach shooting, the Columbine High School massacre, and the Isla Vista attacks.

== Reactions ==
The director of the mosque, Imam Taha Hassane, said it was "extremely outrageous to target a place of worship". Tazheen Nizam, the executive director of the Council on American–Islamic Relations in San Diego, stated: "No one should ever fear for their safety while attending prayers or studying at an elementary school."

Mayor of San Diego Todd Gloria condemned the shooting on X, stating: "Anyone who seeks to do harm here should understand the response will be swift and you will be brought to justice. No one in our city should ever have to fear for their safety in a house of faith." Governor of California Gavin Newsom condemned the shooting on X, stating: "Hate has no place in California and we will not tolerate acts of terror ... To the San Diego Muslim community: California stands with you."

Clark's grandfather released a statement following the shooting, saying "We're very sorry for what happened" and "It's a shock." Vazquez's family released a statement which partially stated, "We condemn these hateful and violent acts."

President Donald Trump called the shooting a "terrible situation" and stated: "I've been given some early updates but we're going to be going back and looking at it very strongly."

Mayor of New York City Zohran Mamdani condemned the shooting on X, stating: "Islamophobia endangers Muslim communities across this country. We must confront it directly and stand together against the politics of fear and division."

In September 2026, in response to the shooting, the San Diego City Council adopted what they called a "working definition of Islamophobia", a callback to the International Holocaust Remembrance Alliance's working definition of Antisemitism that it had adopted before the attack and which had proved controversial to many Islamic people in the community affected by the attack.

== See also ==
- List of shootings in California
- Escondido mosque fire and 2019 Poway synagogue shooting – 2019 attacks targeting places of worship in San Diego County also inspired by the Christchurch mosque shootings
