= 2025 Odintsovo school attack =

School attack in Moscow Oblast, Russia

- Location: 55°43′36″N 37°09′39″E; Uspenskaya Secondary School, Gorki-2, Odintsovo, Moscow Oblast, Russia
- Date: December 16, 2025 c.9:00 a.m. (MSK; UTC+03:00)
- Target: Immigrants and a school teacher.
- Attack type: Mass stabbing; school stabbing; child murder
- Weapons: Knife; Pepper spray; Improvised explosive device (unused); Replica Glock pistol (unused)
- Deaths: 1
- Injuries: 4 (including the perpetrator)
- Perpetrator: Timofey Kulyamov
- Motive: Ethnic hatred; Far-right ideology; Christchurch mosque shootings copycat crime; Infamy

On 16 December 2025, a mass stabbing occurred at Uspenskaya Secondary School in Gorki-2, a suburb of Odintsovo city, Moscow Oblast. Students, school teachers, and staff were attacked with a knife and pepper spray, killing 10-year-old pupil of Tajik descent, Qobiljon Aliyev, and injuring three others before being detained by law enforcement. A 15-year-old student, Timofey Kulyamov, was arrested and charged with murder and attempted murder. It was found that the suspect had connections to white supremacy, Neo-Nazism, and racism.

A criminal investigation is currently being headed by the Investigative Committee of Russia. The suspect also claimed the attack was targeted against a school teacher who was not present that day, and recorded the attack using a phone mounted on a helmet.

== Background ==
The attack followed a period of a few attacks against schools in Russia, with the most recent and notable one being the Bryansk school shooting in 2023. However, multiple, lesser known incidents had occurred in the months leading up to the attack.

A teenage student wounded four of his fellow pupils with a hammer in Chelyabinsk in 2024. A stabbing at a school in Saint Petersburg also occurred the previous day on December 15, showed a trend of violence at schools was rising in the country.

The Uspenskaya Secondary School began operation in only 2024, after a two year construction period. 550 students initially attended the school, eventually expanding to 1,332 students by the time of the attack.

== Attack ==
Reports of a stabbing at Uspenskaya Secondary School were received at around 9:00 a.m. At approximately 8:50 a.m., the assailant had entered the school armed with a knife, pepper spray, an imitation handgun, and an improvised explosive device. He went to the bathroom, started a video recording, prepared for the attack and after leaving the bathroom, he started searching for a specific teacher's office to plant the explosives as he believed the teacher was the reason behind his bad grades and thought the teacher was too strict, but could not recall the location. Whilst wandering the building, another teacher would alert the school's security for suspicious behaviour. When asked what he was doing by a teacher, he replied "you will read about it on Wikipedia.".

Later the perpetrator came across a group of students, asking them what their ethnicities are. Around the same time, a security guard, Dmitry Pavlov, arrived and approached the attacker, which prompted him to spray and stab the guard before charging at the students. While the students and a teacher quickly ran to hide in a classroom, one of the students, 10-year-old fourth-grade pupil Qobiljon Aliyev, couldn't hide in time and the attacker began chasing him. Eventually, the pupil tripped down the stairs and hit the wall. Then, the attacker fatally stabbed him a few times and sprayed his face. The boy was later found to be a Tajikistan national. The attacker took multiple selfies with the body of the student and posted it on social media.

Following this, the livestream ended and the assailant injured a further two people, one being a teacher, before taking another hostage in a barricaded room. They were swiftly arrested following the arrival of special forces, with the hostage found to be uninjured. The injured were transported and treated at Roshal center hospital. The attacker had filmed his attack and shared it to several Telegram channels.

== Victim ==
Qobiljon Aliyev (often transliterated as Kobiljon in Russian) was a Tajikistani who had moved to Russia with his mother and younger brother. The victim's mother worked as a cleaner at the same school. The Tajik Foreign Ministry would become involved in the incident, request an impartial probe into the attack, and condemning the attack as "ethnic hatred."

On 17 December, his mother made the decision to return and bury her son's body in Tajikistan. She had been in contact with the Tajik Foreign Ministry via the Tajik embassy following the attack. They had planned to return to Tajikistan before the attack.

== Suspect ==
Following the attack, the Investigative Committee of Russia (ICRF) announced that a criminal case against 15-year-old student Timofey Kulyamov had been launched. Uspenskaya Secondary School described Kulyamov as a loner with no friends. Teachers did not notice unusual behavior from him, besides being quiet and his tendency to "cry over trivial matters".

A day prior to the attack, Kulyamov sent a manifesto entitled "My Wrath" (Russian: Мой гнев) to a class group chat. In the manifesto, he states his hatred for society, calling other humans "bio-garbage." Far-right and Neo-Nazi sentiment is also present throughout the writing, with Kulyamov showing a hatred for Muslims, LGBTQ people, Jews, anti-fascists, and liberals.

The clothing allegedly worn by Kulyamov on the day of the attack was also similar to previous far-right mass murderers. He wore a tactical vest with a Kolovrat imprinted on the chest area, similar to that worn by Brenton Tarrant and Payton Gendron, although their imprint included a Black Sun. He wrote certain far-right phrases on an imitation firearm and a helmet worn in the attack, some of which were attributed to Dylann Roof. The words "No Lives Matter" were found written on the suspect's t-shirt.

On the internet, Kulyamov would use to pseudonym "Refetor". He was active in the community of the video game GoreBox, apparently playing and discussing maps designed as recreations of various mass shootings, including the 2019 Bærum mosque attack. He also heavily discussed his aforementioned far-right views.

== Investigation ==
According to the ICRD, Kulyamov confessed to the attack in custody. A search of the suspect's house yielded an inert explosive device.

Indonesian National Police would make a link to the attack and the Jakarta school bombing, which occurred a month earlier. The imitation pistol owned by Kulyamov had the words "2025 Jakarta Bombing" inscribed into it. It is possible that Kulyamov and the suspect in the Jakarta school bombing could have been radicalised via similar methods.

== Aftermath ==
On 24 December 2025, Valery Fadeyev, head of the Presidential Council for Civil Society and Human Rights publicly called for social media users to stop posting video footage of the attack in Odintsovo, particularly those depicting the killing of Qobiljon Aliyev.

On 29 December, Sergey Melikov, head of the Republic of Dagestan, awarded Alina Feyzullayeva, a Dagestani teacher at Uspenskaya Secondary School, the Medal "For Courage" for sheltering students in her classroom during the attack.

=== Influenced attacks ===
In the months following the attack, several similar attacks across Russia would occur, some directly inspire or otherwise influenced by the Odintsovo school attack. These included an attack in Nizhnekamsk, on 22 January, where a custodian at was stabbed and injured by a 13-year-old student who was also carrying firecrackers and a flare gun. On the morning of 3 February, ninth-grade student in Ufa shot a teacher and three students with a BB gun. Later that same day, a 14-year-old seventh-grade student injured her peer with a kitchen knife in Kodinsk. On 4 February, an arson and hammer attack at a school in Krasnoyarsk was perpetrated by a 14-year-old female eighth-grade student who was then arrested. On 7 February, six Indian students were injured in a mass stabbing at a university in Ufa. A 15-year-old was arrested. On 11 February, a 17-year-old opened fire at the Anapa Technical College in Anapa. One security guard was killed, and two other victims were injured.

School attacks in other countries have also been found to have been influenced by the one in Odintsovo, such as a stabbing in Bistrița, Romania, and another attack in Torreón, Mexico.

== See also ==
- List of school attacks in Russia
