= 2026 Padang school bombing =

School bombing in West Sumatra, Indonesia

- Location: 0.8351°S 100.3658°E; MAN 3 Padang; Padang, West Sumatra, Indonesia
- Date: 14 July 2026 c. 11:30 (WIB)
- Target: A classmate of the perpetrator (alleged)
- Attack type: Bombing, school attack
- Weapon: 4 Improvised explosive devices (only 1 were used)
- Deaths: 0
- Injuries: 0
- Motive: Alleged revenge related to bullying, 2025 Jakarta school bombing (under investigation)
- Accused: 17-year-old male student

On 14 July 2026, a homemade low-explosive device detonated on school grounds at Madrasah Aliyah Negeri (MAN) 3 in Padang, West Sumatra, Indonesia. A 17-year-old student, identified by police only by the initial "R", was found to have brought four homemade devices onto campus in his school bag; one detonated beside a twelfth-grade classroom during a school break, while the remaining three were recovered unexploded and later destroyed by a police bomb squad. No one was killed or injured.

Indonesia's counter-terrorism unit Densus 88 and the West Sumatra Regional Police opened an investigation, and the student was later placed in a rehabilitation program while the case continued.

== Background ==
=== MAN 3 Padang ===
Madrasah Aliyah Negeri 3 Padang is a state-run Islamic senior high school operating under Indonesia's Ministry of Religious Affairs, located in the Balai Gadang area of Koto Tangah district in Padang, the capital of West Sumatra.

=== Prior incidents ===
The student later told investigators he had been inspired by the 2025 bombing at SMA Negeri 72 in Jakarta in November 2025. Police noted several parallels between the two cases, including that both alleged perpetrators were students who reported being bullied and who said they had taught themselves to build explosives using material found online.

== Incident ==
According to police, the perpetrator brought four homemade low-explosive devices to school inside his bag on the morning of 14 July 2026, arriving at around 10:15 WIB. He placed the devices in a desk drawer near a twelfth-grade classroom, Class XII IPS 7. At around 11:30, during a school break, he detonated one of the devices using a lighter.

The explosion, which police classified as low explosive, left a scorch mark and a minor crack in a classroom wall but caused no injuries. The blast caused panic among students and staff, and the school ended classes early for the day. The remaining three devices were located inside his bag and secured by the Bomb Disposal Unit (Gegana) of the West Sumatra Regional Police, which destroyed them in a controlled disposal that evening.

Police said the device that exploded had been placed near where a specific classmate of the perpetrator usually sat, and that investigators believed that student was the intended target. Officers said the suspicious item was first noticed by a school security guard, who alerted school staff before police were called.

Items recovered from the scene and from his bag included a black box, a black bag, a mobile phone, firecrackers, a knife, arrows, marbles, bolts, and a homemade Molotov cocktail, amounting to 19 pieces of evidence in total.

== Perpetrator ==
=== Background ===
The perpetrator was, at the time of the incident, a twelfth-grade (Class XII) student at MAN 3 Padang. According to the head of the Padang office of the Ministry of Religious Affairs, Yasril, he had asked his parents to let him transfer to a different school since the start of eleventh grade, citing alleged bullying by classmates; his parents did not pursue the request with the school, reasoning that only one year of study remained. As a result, school staff said they had not been aware of the reported bullying or the student's psychological distress before the bombing.

Investigators said the suspect had spent about four months researching how to build an explosive device, using material found online, including videos, and had purchased components through online shopping platforms. He assembled the device at home without his parents' knowledge before bringing it to school on the day of the incident.

=== Motive and investigation ===
As of 15 July 2026, police had not formally confirmed a motive. Investigators said the student had told them he acted out of built-up resentment ("dendam") after repeated bullying by a classmate, but cautioned that this account was still being verified. West Sumatra Regional Police public relations chief Susmelawati Rosya said the case appeared to be linked to psychological distress from ongoing bullying by classmates, though the investigation was continuing. Densus 88 spokesperson Mayndra Eka Wardhana said he had also mentioned participating in online groups discussing explosives manufacturing; this claim remained under investigation.

By 15 July, police had interviewed seven witnesses, including the school's security guard and the suspect's parents.

=== Legal process and rehabilitation ===
After his arrest, the perpetrator was placed at the Bapelkes (Health Training Center) in Gunung Pangilun, Padang, to undergo rehabilitation while the legal process continued under the supervision of Padang City Police and the local National Unity and Politics Agency (Kesbangpol). Because he was in his final year of secondary school, education authorities said he would not be formally transferred but would instead continue his studies at a nearby school, MAN 2 Padang, while his diploma would still be issued by MAN 3 Padang.

== Aftermath ==
=== School response ===
Classes at MAN 3 Padang resumed as normal the following day, 15 July 2026, including in the classroom where the explosion had occurred. School principal Marliza said students had returned for regular activities from early morning, and that the school had assigned three guidance counselors to provide trauma support to students affected by the incident.

=== Ministry of Religious Affairs response ===
Yasril, head of the Padang office of the Ministry of Religious Affairs, announced that all madrasah in the city would adopt a new student-monitoring system, called Program Wali Siswa, beginning in the current academic year. Under the program, each teacher would be assigned to personally monitor between 15 and 20 students from grade 10 through grade 12, in addition to existing homeroom teachers, to identify and respond to students' personal problems.

== Reactions ==
=== Law enforcement ===
Densus 88 spokesperson Mayndra Eka Wardhana confirmed that only one of the four devices had detonated and that it was classified as low explosive. Padang City Police criminal investigation chief M. Yasin said the device had been prepared over several months and assembled independently by the student at his home.

=== Comparisons with prior incidents ===
Several Indonesian outlets compared the case to the November 2025 bombing at SMA Negeri 72 Jakarta, noting that both incidents involved a student perpetrator who reported being bullied and who said they had learned to build explosives independently through the internet.

=== Legislative ===
Following the incident, members of the People's Representative Council (DPR) called for police to strengthen prevention measures against homemade bomb attacks in schools.

== See also ==
- 2025 Jakarta school bombing
- Densus 88
- Terrorism in Indonesia
- Padang
- Ministry of Religious Affairs (Indonesia)
