= List of school attacks in Poland =

This chronological list of school attacks in Poland that occurred at K–12 public and private schools, as well as at colleges and universities, and on school buses. Excluded from this list are the following:

1. Incidents that occurred as a result of police actions.
2. Suicides or suicide attempts involving only one person.
3. Incidents during World War II.

== List ==
| Date | Location | Perpetrator(s) | Dead | Injured | Total | Description |
|---|---|---|---|---|---|---|
| 6 May 1925 | Wilno | Stanisław Ławrynowicz; Janusz Obrąpalski | 5 (Note: Including two perpetrators) | 10 | 15 | Wilno school massacre: Two students threw grenades and fired guns at their high school, killing three people and wounding ten others. Both perpetrators committed suicide. |
| 15 November 1926 | Warsaw | Stanisław Lampisz | 1 | 1 (Note: Including the perpetrator or suspect) | 2 | A 19-year-old suspended student shot and killed a principal and attempted suicide. |
| 25 October 1933 | Warsaw | Unnamed | 1 | 11 | 12 | A student was killed and eleven others were wounded in a fight involving knives and guns at the University of Warsaw. |
| 1 April 1936 | Janikowo | Stefan Bykowski | 2 | 2 | 4 | A fired teacher killed two other teachers with a handgun before wounding a responding police officer and attempting suicide. |
| 4 November 1957 | Zelów | Tadeusz Byjoch | 1 | 11 | 12 | An intoxicated principal suffering from mental disorders attacked students with an axe at a Catholic school, killing a 14-year-old boy and injuring eleven other people. |
| 24 March 1998 | Wrocław | Piotr P. | 0 | 3 | 3 | A 19-year-old student with an axe and knife attacked and injured three teachers. |
| 16 December 2001 | Kluczbork | Kazimierz J. | 2 | 1 | 3 | A 62-year-old man shot and wounded his wife in a school courtyard, then killed a man nearby and killed himself. |
| 19 June 2002 | Gdańsk | Kamil Putrzyński | 1 | 1 | 2 | A 23-year-old student at the Gdańsk University of Technology killed another student and injured a lecturer with an axe. |
| 10 May 2019 | Wawer | Emil Barański | 1 | 0 | 1 | A 15-year old student stabbed a 16-year old student to death over a drug debt. He was later sentenced to 25 years in prison. |
| 27 May 2019 | Brześć Kujawski | Marek Nowak | 0 | 2 | 3 | Brześć Kujawski school shooting: An 18-year-old detonated firecrackers and shot at people inside his former primary school, injuring a student and a custodian. |
| 29 September 2020 | Zielona Góra | Kinga Herbut | 0 | 3 | 3 | A 17-year-old student stabbed three other students with two kitchen knives. |
| 29 November 2023 | Kadzidło | Albert Gut | 0 | 3 | 3 | An 18-year-old student injured three people with a knife at school. |
| 5 December 2023 | Warsaw | 15-year-old | 0 | 1 | 1 | A 15-year-old student stabbed another student during a fight. |
| 7 May 2025 | Warsaw | Mieszko Ruciński | 1 | 1 | 2 | 2025 University of Warsaw attack: A 22-year-old law student at the University of Warsaw killed an employee with an axe and injured a security guard. |
| 22 September 2026 | Ptaki | 11-year-old male student | 0 | 1 | 1 | An 11-year-old boy randomly attacked a 10-year-old girl with a hatchet at a primary school in the village of Ptaki, Poland. The boy was subdued by a parent and the girl was taken to hospital. |
| 7 October 2026 | Ostrołęka | Jakub Z. | 0 | 10 | 10 | 2026 Poland school stabbings: A 19-year-old student attacked seven people with a machete at a vocational school, as well as two passersby, before fleeing and attempting suicide. |
| 8 October 2026 | Leszczydół-Nowiny | Wiktor Ś. | 1 | 2 | 3 | 2026 Poland school stabbings: A 15-year-old entered a school in the village of Leszczydół-Nowiny, Wyszków County, and attacked three staff members with a knife, one of whom later died from their injuries. The suspect was subsequently taken into police custody. |
| 10 October 2026 | Warsaw | Kamila D. | 0 | 3 | 3 | 2026 Poland school stabbings: Three women (aged 17, 17 and 24) were stabbed and injured with a knife at a post-secondary school. A 21-year-old suspect was arrested. |
