= SHR =

SHR can refer to:

- The IATA code for Sheridan County Airport
- Logical shift right operator in some programming languages
  - Logical shift right in x86 instruction listings
- Self-healing ring
- SHR (operating system) for smartphones
- Scottish Housing Regulator
- Sand Hill Road
- Shrewsbury railway station station code
- Spontaneously hypertensive rat, a laboratory rat
- Stewart–Haas Racing, US stockcar racing team
- Supplementary Homicide Reports, a US database
- Synology Hybrid RAID, an automated RAID management system
- Sam Hunt Racing, US stockcar racing team
