= 2026 Poland school attacks =

Series of school attacks in Poland

- Location: Masovian Voivodeship, Poland
- Date: 7–10 October 2026; 11:05–c.11:25 a.m. (Ostrołęka); 9:00 a.m. (Leszczydół-Nowiny); 12:30 p.m.–c. 12:34 (Warsaw) (UTC+2)
- Attack type: School attacks; mass stabbings
- Weapons: Ostrołęka: Machete; Homemade bomb (unused; failed to detonate); Leszczydół-Nowiny: Three knives (only one used); Warsaw: Knife
- Deaths: 1 (in Leszczydół-Nowiny)
- Injuries: Ostrołęka: 10 (including the perpetrator); Leszczydół-Nowiny: 2; Warsaw: 3
- Motive: Nihilistic violent extremism; Misanthropy; Online glorification of violence
- Accused: Jakub Z. (Ostrołęka); Wiktor Ś. (Leszczydół-Nowiny); Kamila D. (Warsaw)
- Charges: Jakub Z.: nine charges: Attempted murder of multiple people using explosives; Attempted murder with a knife (x6); Making criminal threats; Creating an immediate danger to the lives or health of multiple people; Wiktor Ś.: three charges: Murder; Attempted murder (x2); Kamila D.: five charges: Attempted murder (x3); Violating the bodily integrity of a policewoman; Making criminal threats

Between 7 and 10 October 2026, three separate uncoordinated school stabbings were carried out at schools across the Masovian Voivodeship of Poland. The first took place in Ostrołęka on 7 October, injuring ten people, including the suspect. The second occurred on 8 October in Leszczydół-Nowiny, leaving one person dead and two others injured. The third took place in Warsaw on 10 October, three people were injured.

According to Prime Minister Donald Tusk, the attacks were motivated by nihilistic violent extremism rather than political views. Tusk also cited online glorification of violence as a contributing factor. The attacks also resulted in debate over Poland's implementation of the European Union's Digital Services Act, following President Karol Nawrocki's veto of the legislation in January.

== Background ==
School attacks are rare in Poland, although in September 2026 police detained a 13-year-old suspected of planning an attack and found a knife in his bag. That same month, an 11-year-old boy attacked a 10-year-old girl with a hatchet at a primary school in the village of Ptaki, and a 17-year-old neo-Nazi was arrested for allegedly plotting an attack on a school and a mosque.

== Attacks ==
Between 7 and 10 October 2026, three separate school stabbings were carried out at schools across Masovian Voivodeship, Poland.

=== 7 October: Ostrołęka ===
On 7 October, around 11:05 a.m. CEST, a 19-year-old Jakub Z., a student in his final year, attacked nine people with a machete at Vocational School Complex No. 4 in Ostrołęka before inflicting injuries on himself and being detained by the police. The injured comprised five students, two teachers, and two bystanders. The victims were treated at the Mazovian Specialist Hospital in Ostrołęka. Police confirmed that the suspect was taken to a hospital following his arrest.

Students barricaded themselves inside classrooms before police detained the suspect about 20 minutes after the attack began. The Masovian Police released a photograph showing the suspect lying face down on the ground, with his bloodied hands handcuffed behind his back, as two officers stood nearby. According to reports, the suspect was also carrying homemade explosives in his backpack.

=== 8 October: Leszczydół-Nowiny ===
The day following the attack in Ostrołęka, another stabbing took place in Leszczydół-Nowiny. A 15-year-old Wiktor Ś., a graduate of the John Paul II Primary School, entered the school premises armed with three knives at approximately 9:00 a.m. CEST. A 37-year-old school caretaker attempted to prevent the suspect from entering. He wounded three people, including the school caretaker, who died. The school principal, Krzysztof Ochmański, restrained the attacker, who then began apologising and assuring that he "didn't want to do it anymore", put the knives down, and asked for a hug.

According to Tusk, the suspect was wearing a helmet mounted with a camera, with which he was reportedly recording the incident, making it the first incident of its kind in Poland. The police are in possession of the recording.

=== "Bloody Friday" and other plots ===
On 8 October, reports regarding alleged planned attacks on schools began circulating widely on social media. Screenshots and recordings warning of a so-called "Bloody Friday", supposedly set for Friday, 9 October, were shared among students and parents. The police assured that they are monitoring the situation and have announced the presence of officers at schools. Police also detained a 17-year-old in Sierpc who allegedly discussed doing "something bad" at a school. Officers reportedly found two knives on the suspect and searches related to attacks on his phone. Fifty schools had all lessons called off on 9 October. Forty-five of those schools were located in the Masovian Voivodeship, three in the Świętokrzyskie Voivodeship, and one each in the Podlaskie and Warmian–Masurian Voivodeships.

On 9 October, a 14-year-old carrying a knife with the words "śmierć społeczniakom" (lit. 'death to normies') was apprehended in Mokotów, a district of Warsaw. A 16-year-old carrying a butterfly knife was taken into custody in the Warsaw district of Śródmieście the same day. Two 15-year-old students were apprehended in Pruszków after threatening the life of several people on social media, a 14-year-old in Józefów was stopped after attempting to bring a knife to school, and an inhabitant of Wiskitki Municipality was arrested in Mszczonów after threatening several people online. A 13-year-old from Płock also sent a video threatening the lives of several students from Płock schools, a 16-year-old student from Jednorożec was apprehended by Przasnysz police after telling his friends he would bring a machete to school, and a 15-year-old in Ostrów Mazowiecka stated he would kill several people.

On the afternoon of 9 October, the Ministry of the Interior and Administration released a statement that 24,000 police officers had been mobilised and 15,000 schools had been patrolled. At least 19 people had also been apprehended in connection to the attempted attacks. By 5 p.m. CEST on 9 October, 35,000 schools had been patrolled, 172 incidents were documented, and 59 people were detained. As of 11 October, police detained 117 people for carrying weapons and threatening to attack schools and students; police checked 64,000 schools.

=== 10 October: Warsaw ===
On 10 October at 12:30 p.m. CEST, 21-year-old Kamila D., a female student, attacked three other students with a knife at TEB Edukacja, an adult education school on Mińska Street in Warsaw. The victims, two aged 17 and one aged 24, were injured, with one of the 17-year-olds taken to hospital. Police officers arrived at the scene four minutes after receiving the report, and the suspect was detained by police.

== Legal proceedings and investigation ==
On 8 October, prosecutors brought nine charges against 19-year-old Jakub Z., including the attempted murder of multiple people using explosives, six counts of attempted murder with a knife, making criminal threats, and creating an immediate danger to the lives or health of multiple people. During questioning he pleaded guilty to all charges On 10 October, the court ordered the 15-year-old Wiktor Ś. to be placed in a juvenile detention centre for three months, equivalent to pre-trial detention for adults. The facility is a closed institution where juveniles are supervised by educators and security staff. During the questioning he pleaded guilty to all charges. On 11 October, police announced that 21-year-old Kamila D. had been charged with five offenses, including the attempted murder of three people, violating the bodily integrity of a policewoman, and making criminal threats. The court ordered her to be remanded in custody for three months. During questioning at the prosecutor's office and a subsequent detention hearing, she pleaded guilty.

Tusk stated the attacks were motivated by nihilistic violent extremism, a term used by law enforcement to describe violence motivated by misanthropy and nihilism rather than political ideology. He also added that some of those detained were active in far-right circles, with the authorities observing increased online searches for Nazism-related content and mass killers who had become online idols, and attributed the attacks to the online glorification of violence.

The Polish government has so far found no evidence that the attacks were motivated by an internet challenge or that they were coordinated. According to Kacper Rekawek, a senior researcher at the International Centre for Counter-Terrorism, one of the suspected attackers used the same imagery as Brenton Tarrant, the perpetrator of the Christchurch mosque shootings.

== Reactions ==
Tusk expressed concern about the possibility of copycat crimes, citing online violence, internet challenges, and media coverage that he said promoted violence. He convened an emergency meeting on 8 October with ministers, police and security officials to discuss the school attacks. Police in northeastern Poland announced increased security checks around primary and secondary schools.

The incidents also reignited debate in Poland over the European Union's Digital Services Act (DSA). Tusk suggested that President Karol Nawrocki's January veto of legislation implementing the act had prevented authorities from obtaining tools to combat online youth radicalisation. The DSA requires online platforms to address illegal content and improve transparency. A revised implementation framework was signed in September. Jarosław Kaczyński, leader of the opposition Law and Justice party, questioned whether the incidents were connected, suggesting they could be part of a Russian hybrid warfare campaign. He cited similar attacks in Lithuania and alleged that Russian websites encouraged young people to carry out such acts. Poland's Internal Security Agency later confirmed that the attacks were not conducted by a foreign state.

On 15 October, 45-year-old Krzysztof Z., father of Ostrołęka stabbing suspect Jakub Z., died by suicide. He had previously been convicted of abusing his family and had been sentenced to over 2 years' imprisonment for it.

== See also ==
- List of school attacks in Poland
- List of mass stabbing incidents (2020–present)
- 2026 Bahçeşehir school attack, another school attack that occurred a few days before in Turkey
- 2026 Fagersta school attack, another school attack that occurred in Sweden
