= Mińska Street =

Street in Praga-Południe, Warsaw

- Mińska Street in 2025
- Interactive map of Mińska Street
- Part of: Praga-Południe
- Location: Warsaw, Poland
- Coordinates: 52°14′52.0″N 21°03′24.0″E
- From: Grochowska Street
- Major junctions: Kamionkowska Street; Bliska Street; Głucha Street; Gocławska Street; Rybna Street; Wawerska Street; Chodakowska Street; Stanisławowska Street; Owsiana Street; Terespolska Street; Podskarbińska Street
- To: Podskarbińska Street

Mińska Street (lit. 'Minsk Street') is a street in the Kamionek neighborhood of the Praga-Południe district in Warsaw, Poland.

== History ==
"Pocisk" Ammunition Works at 25, Mińska Street before 1939

In the 19th century, it was a road separating the fields of Skaryszew. At that time, houses with gardens stood along the street. In 1891–1892, the first multi-story tenement building was built on the street.

In 1889, the area around the street was incorporated into Warsaw. In 1899, the factory of the Linen and Jute Manufactory Joint-Stock Company was established at no. 25. By 1914, the enterprise employed approximately 600 workers. After 1918, the "Pocisk" Ammunition Works where established on the site of the factory.

In the early 1950s, the Warsaw Motorcycle Factory (WFM) took over the grounds of the destroyed "Pocisk" plant. WFM motorcycles and the Osa scooter were manufactured there. In 1965, production was relocated to Szczecin, and the WFM plants were taken over by the State Optical Works.

In 1950, the October Revolution Printing House—one of the largest printing plants in Poland—began operations at no. 65.

In 1990, a boulder commemorating Józef Piłsudski was unveiled at the gateway to the property at no. 25. After Piłsudski returned to Poland in November 1918, he visted Aleksandra Szczerbińska—who was living in a building located at the same property, which has since been demolished.

In 2010, the development of Soho Factory—a new mixed-use residential and service complex—began on the site of the former WFM factory, covering an area of over seven hectares.

On 10 October 2026, 21-year-old female student attacked three women with a knife at TEB Edukacja, an adult education school located on the street. The victims, aged 17, 17 and 24, were injured, and one of the 17-year-olds was taken to hospital, and the suspect was detained by police.
