= 2026 Bashkir State Medical University stabbings =

Stabbing attack in Bashkortostan, Russia

Bashkir State Medical University attack
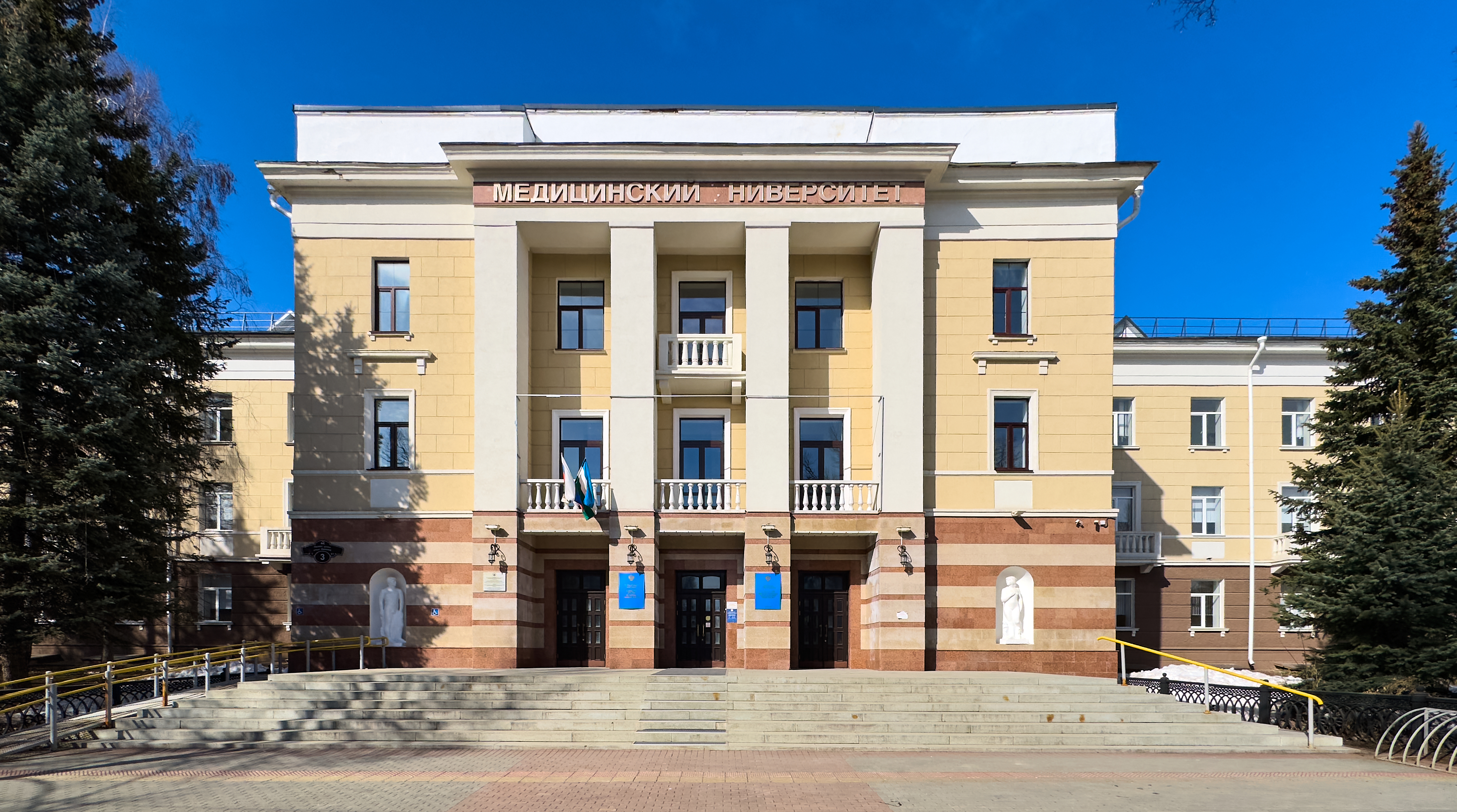
- Bashkortostan State Medical University in 2025
- Location: Ufa, Bashkortostan, Russia
- Date: 7 February 2026
- Target: Students
- Attack type: Mass stabbing
- Weapons: Knife; pepper spray; firecrackers; brass knuckles (unused)
- Deaths: 0
- Injuries: 7 (including the suspect)
- Motive: Under investigation (likely neo-Nazism)
- Accused: Alexander S.

On 7 February 2026, a mass stabbing occurred at a student residence of Bashkir State Medical University in Ufa, Bashkortostan, Russia. A 15-year-old male entered the dormitory and attacked students and responding policemen before being detained by authorities. Seven people were injured, including four students from India and the suspect. A criminal case was opened by Russian law enforcement.

== Attack ==
A 15-year-old male entered a dormitory of Bashkir State Medical University. Russian media reported that he was armed with a knife and injured several people inside the facility. At the time of the attack, no security guards were on duty. He reportedly trashed the floor, set off firecrackers and attempted to enter rooms where students had barricaded themselves. SHOT reported that the perpetrator also had brass knuckles and pepper spray. Videos at the university showed blood on the floor, the windows of doors broken and ambulances transporting the injured to hospitals. Baza reported the attacker was a supporter of the National Socialism / White Power Neo-Nazi extremist group operating in Russia. In 2021, it was designated a terrorist organization by the Supreme Court of Russia. They also reported that the perpetrator drew a swastika on a wall using the blood of a victim. Students reported that he shouted various nationalist slogans about the Holocaust.

== Victims ==
During the attempt to detain him, the suspect resisted and two policemen were injured. According to Interfax, at least five victims were hospitalized following the incident. The victims were a 24-year-old stabbed in the abdomen and back, another 24-year-old who suffered a chemical eye burn, a 21-year-old stabbed in the face, a 35-year-old security guard stabbed in the thigh and jaw, a 23-year-old student with multiple stab wounds and hemorrhagic shock and a 17-year-old stabbed in the arm and neck. Two victims were transported to the City Hospital No. 10, while four others were transported to hospitals in moderate condition. Four of the injured victims were identified as Indian students. One victim was discharged later in the day. The suspect harmed himself and was transported to a local children's hospital in serious condition. He was placed in the intensive care unit with injuries to his neck and forearm. The cuts did not cause significant blood loss and he was expected to be released after nine days.

== Suspect ==
Russian sources identified the suspect as 15-year-old Alexander S. He was described as a calm and serious student who stayed out of trouble and only talked to a few children in class. He lived with his 51-year-old disabled and deaf mother and 67-year-old grandmother. He did not have a father, and his family is very poor.

== Aftermath ==
After the suspect was detained, police secured the surrounding area of the dormitory. Emergency services treated the injured, while investigators interviewed witnesses and examined available surveillance footage. A criminal case has been opened under Part 3 of Article 30, Subparagraph “a” of Part 2 of Article 105 (“Attempted murder of two or more persons”) and Article 317 of the Criminal Code of the Russian Federation (“Encroachment on the life of a law enforcement officer”). A second criminal case was opened a day later under the article "Negligence".
