= 2026 Bistrița school stabbing =

School attack in Romania

- A CCTV still of the perpetrator standing near a classroom door

- Location: Bistrița, Bistrița-Năsăud County, Romania
- Date: October 19, 2026
- Attack type: Mass stabbing; school attack; school stabbing
- Weapon: Pocket knife
- Deaths: 0
- Injuries: 3 (including the perpetrator)
- Perpetrator: Unnamed

On 19 October 2026, a mass stabbing attack occurred at the "Ștefan Cel Mare" Secondary School No. 6 in Bistrița, Bistrița-Năsăud County, Romania. Andi, a 13-year-old student enrolled at the school, stabbed and injured two people before being subdued.

== Background ==
The incident occurred against a backdrop of raising school attacks across Europe in 2026, with notable incidents reported in Poland, France and Sweden. Investigators and officials linked several of these attacks to extremist online subcultures and social media channels that glorify violence.

== Attack ==
Prior to the attack, the perpetrator announced his intentions on TikTok while making the OK hand gesture. Upon arriving at the school, he went to the bathroom to equip his gear, where he also filmed himself and sent a part of the video through TikTok messages. He then went to a 6th grade classroom and knocked on the door multiple times. Once the teacher opened the door, he stabbed her repeatedly before turning on the students. One student attempted to defend himself by confronting the attacker but was also stabbed. Hearing the commotion, school staff and security personnel responded immediately and neutralized the attacker.

== Investigation ==
"I'll go to school, but I'll wait in the bathroom until the bell rings, then I'll equip my gear and try to start a livestream, then I'll go down where the shit skin usually is and do something probably similar to Timofey, after that I plan to go back upstairs and try to stab Edu, Luca, Marco and Andreas, but if I can't find them or stab them, I will also stab indiscriminately”

— Unnamed 13-year-old perpetrator

Because the perpetrator is a minor under Romanian law, his identity is heavily withheld. However, according to the Prosecutor's Office, the attack was premeditated. Investigations revealed that the suspect held neo-Nazi and far-right extremist ideologies, and was influenced by transnational online subcultures, including the Christchurch mosque shootings and the 2025 Odinstovo school attack. Prosecutors noted that the attacker targeted specific individuals out of racial hatred and was active within digital fringe spaces such as online true crime and extremist communities.

The police and the Prosecutor's Office in Bistrița announced that a criminal investigation had been opened on suspicion of attempted aggravated murder. As the student is under 14-years-old, he cannot be held criminally responsible under Romanian law. The teenager lives in Dumitrița, near Bistrița, where he and his family returned from Spain in 2020.
