= Skull mask =

Usage of skull print masks by neo-Nazis

A person wearing a skull print mask at an anti-LGBT protest in May 2023 in Kraków, Poland

The skull mask (also called the Siege mask) is a black balaclava or lower-face covering printed with a white skeletal jaw or full skull design. Since 2016 it has been used by members of certain neo-Nazi and militant accelerationist groups as both a practical disguise and a visual marker of affiliation, most notably the Atomwaffen Division, The Base, and the Iron March web forum.

== Origin ==
The specific design became common in neo-Nazi circles in 2016 when members of the Atomwaffen Division began wearing it at public demonstrations and in propaganda photographs and videos. The group was active on the Iron March forum, which operated from 2011 to 2017. Iron March incorporated the mask into its own imagery and described it as “the face of 21st century fascism,” stating that it represented rejection of individualism in favor of collective commitment to fascist goals.

The mask is sometimes called a Siege mask after James Mason’s book Siege, a text that advocates terrorist violence to hasten societal collapse. Followers of that text and related accelerationist ideology adopted the mask as a shared visual cue. Patrick Gordon Macdonald, a Canadian graphic designer working under the name "Dark Foreigner" produced artwork that further spread the image, including a 2018 cover illustration for a new edition of Siege that showed a figure wearing the mask.

== Use by groups ==
The mask spread from Atomwaffen Division to other groups that shared the same online networks and accelerationist ideology. These include The Base, Feuerkrieg Division, Britain’s National Action, and Australia’s Antipodean Resistance.

Members of these groups have worn the mask in propaganda videos, at training camps, and during public actions. The covering hides the wearer’s face while signaling membership to others who recognize the design. It has also been used by individuals not formally tied to a named organization but active in the same online accelerationist spaces.

== Appearance in public events ==
A member of the Proud Boys wearing a skull mask during a protest in Raleigh, North Carolina in 2020

Individuals wearing skull masks were present during the January 6 United States Capitol attack. Photographs and video from that day show several participants in the specific lower-face skeletal design associated with accelerationist neo-Nazis.

The same style of mask has appeared at smaller marches and protests in later years, including a November 2024 demonstration in Columbus, Ohio in which participants wore red skull masks and carried flags with swastikas.

== Symbolism ==
Within the networks that use it, the mask functions as an in-group identifier. Iron March texts presented it as a rejection of personal identity in favor of collective fascist purpose. Outside those circles it is recognized by researchers and law-enforcement analysts as a marker linked to accelerationist neo-Nazism.

Similar skull-printed face coverings exist in commercial costume and video-game merchandise. The design associated with the groups listed above is distinguished by its consistent use in their propaganda and by the ideological context in which it appears.

== See also ==
- Atomwaffen Division
- The Base (neo-Nazi group)
- Militant accelerationism
- Iron March
- Siege (Mason book)
