= Islamic schools =

Islamic school or Islamic schools may refer to:

- Madhhab, a school of thought within fiqh (Islamic jurisprudence)
- Madrasa (plural madaris), any educational institution, but in the West referring those with an emphasis on Islamic instruction
- Muslim denominations, religious denominations within Islam, such as Sunni, Shia or Ibadi
