= Uthman ibn Farooq =

Pakistani-American Muslim sheikh and da'i (born 1977

Uthman Ibn Farooq
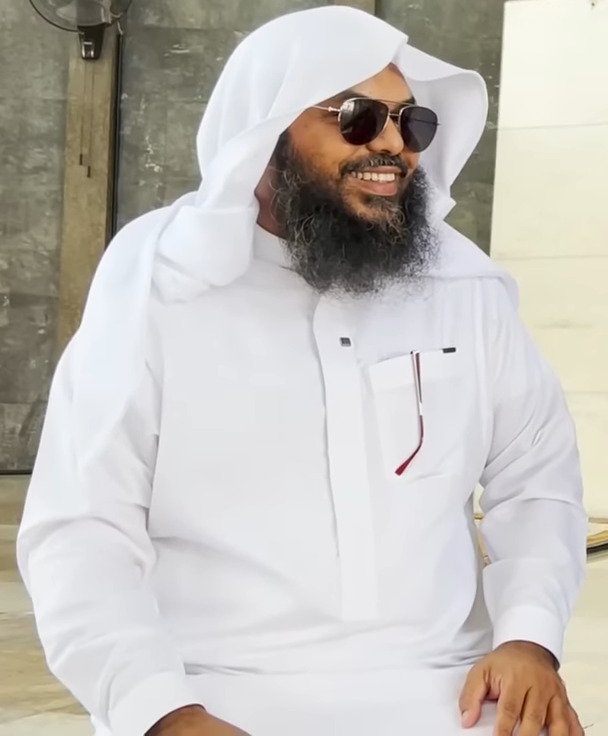
- Ibn Farooq in 2023
- Title: Da'i

Personal life
- Born: Uthman Khan Yusufzai; 1977 (age 48–49) North-West Frontier Province (now Khyber Pakhtunkhwa), Pakistan
- Spouse: (m. 2001)
- Children: 4
- Parent: Farooq Khan (father)
- Main interest(s): Dawah, Comparative Religion, Aqidah, Fiqh, Hadith
- Education: Madinah University; National University (MBA); International Islamic University, Islamabad (M.Phill.)
- Occupation: Islamic preacher, Da'ee
- Website: www.onemessagefoundation.com

Religious life
- Religion: Islam
- Denomination: Sunni
- Jurisprudence: Hanbali
- Creed: Athari
- Movement: Salafi

Muslim leader
- Influenced by: Ahmad Ibn Hanbal; Imam Malik; al-Shafi'i; Ibn Taymiyyah; Ibn Qayyim al-Jawziyyah; Muhammad Ibn Abd al-Wahhab; al-Uthaymin; Bin Baz; Saleh Al-Fawzan; al-Albani; Zubair Ali Zai; Zakir Naik; Awad al-Garguri; Sadiq al-Manna; Yusuf al-Misha
- Years active: September 29, 2014–present

YouTube information
- Channel: @OneMessageFoundation
- Genre: Islamic Dawah
- Subscribers: 1.40 million
- Views: 756.7 million
- Last updated: 7 November 2026

Abu Yusuf Uthman ibn Farooq Khan Yusufzai (Pashto: ابو یوسف عثمان بن فاروق خان یوسف; born Uthman Khan Yusufzai in 1977) is an Pakistani-American Islamic preacher and da'i. He is known for his work with the One Message Foundation. Uthman engages in religious discussions and debates with Christians and atheists.

== Early life and education ==
Uthman Khan Yusufzai was born in 1977 in Khyber Pakhtunkhwa, Pakistan to a Pakistani Pashtun Yusufzai family. He moved to the United States at the age of eight. He grew up with a single mother. As a child he received a religious education under Awad Gargur, later on travelling to countries such as Saudi Arabia, Jordan, Pakistan, and the United Arab Emirates to study Information technology and Technology management. He simultaneously attended various Islamic seminars under Shaykh Sadiq al-Manna, and Shaykh Yusuf al-Misha'al at Umm al-Qura University.

== Career ==
Uthman serves as an Educator at Masjid Al-Ribat in San Diego, California. In addition to his role as an Imam, he has dedicated much of his life to dawah (Islamic outreach). In 2014, he founded the One Message Foundation, a non-profit organisation that focused on Islamic education and outreach through debates, lectures, and street dawah.

=== Controversy ===
On 24 March 2022, Uthman claimed he was stabbed at a San Diego gas station by a man who reportedly stalked Uthman to the gas station.

In 2024, Uthman was denied entry into Trinidad and Tobago as authorities deemed him and his group as undesirable and cited controversy over Uthman's preaching.

In 2025, the Home Secretary of the UK Yvette Cooper banned Uthman from entering the UK, citing public order concerns over some of his views, notably his claims that sex with captives is lawful.

== Personal life ==
Uthman ibn Farooq was married in 2001 to a Pakistani Pashtun woman. He has two sons and two daughters.

== Published works ==
- The Preferred Opinion Regarding the Issue of Rafʿ al-Yadayn, Dar al-Kutub, 2014.

== See also ==
- Biblical criticism
- Criticism of Judaism
- Criticism of Christianity
- Criticism of Atheism
- Islamic apologetics
- Salafi movement
- Islamic fundamentalism
- Dawah
- American Muslims
- Pakistani Americans
- List of Pakistani Americans
- List of Islamic scholars
- List of American Muslims
