= Brześć Kujawski school shooting =

2019 school attack in Poland

- Location: Brześć Kujawski, Kuyavian-Pomeranian Voivodeship, Poland
- Date: 27 May 2019; ~10:00 CET
- Attack type: School shooting, school attack
- Weapons: Revolver; Firecrackers
- Deaths: 0
- Injuries: 3 (including the perpetrator, 1 from gunfire, 1 from fragments from explosive devices)
- Perpetrator: Marek Nowak

On 27 May 2019, a masked former student entered Primary School No. 1 in Brześć Kujawski, Kuyavian-Pomeranian Voivodeship, Poland. The man detonated firecrackers and fired shots, injuring two people before being detained by staff and arrested by police.

== Shooting ==
On the morning of 27 May 2019, around 10:00 CET, a masked 18-year-old man, later identified as Marek Nowak, a former pupil of the school, entered the building armed with a firearm and firecrackers. He threw firecrackers into classrooms and fired multiple shots. An 11-year-old female student was wounded by fragments from the explosive devices, and a 59-year-old school cleaner was shot and injured. Both victims were taken to hospital; their injuries were reported as serious but not life-threatening.

A school custodian confronted the attacker and helped subdue him before police arrived, preventing additional injuries. The assailant was arrested shortly afterwards.

== Perpetrator ==
The attacker, Marek Nowak, was a former student of the same school and was reported to have been undergoing psychiatric treatment prior to the attack. In the days following the shooting, media reported that alarming comments appeared on his social media accounts prior to the event, which were later removed. The perpetrator had multiple Columbine-related pictures and internet memes on his Facebook account.

== Aftermath ==
After the attack, the school was evacuated and classes were suspended for the day while police secured the scene and conducted interviews with students and staff. Family members of the injured spoke publicly about the incident in the days that followed.

In 2023, an appellate court in Poland upheld a 25-year prison sentence against Marek Nowak for the attack, with the possibility of parole after 20 years.

== Trials ==
Following his arrest in May 2019, Marek Nowak underwent multiple psychiatric evaluations to determine criminal responsibility. Prosecutors charged him with attempted murder, causing an explosion endangering life, and bringing a firearm onto school premises.

In December 2021, a regional court found him guilty and sentenced him to 25 years in prison. His defense appealed the verdict, arguing mental health factors, but the appellate court in June 2023 upheld the original sentence. Under Polish law, the ruling requires that he serve at least 20 years before becoming eligible for parole. As of 2023, Marek Nowak remains incarcerated in the Polish prison system.
