= Chula Vista Police Department =

Police department in Chula Vista, California

- Abbreviation: CVPD

Jurisdictional structure
- Legal jurisdiction: Chula Vista, California
- General nature: Local civilian police

Operational structure
- Agency executive: Roxana Kennedy, Chief of Police
- Divisions: Administrative Services Division; Patrol Operations Division; Investigations Division

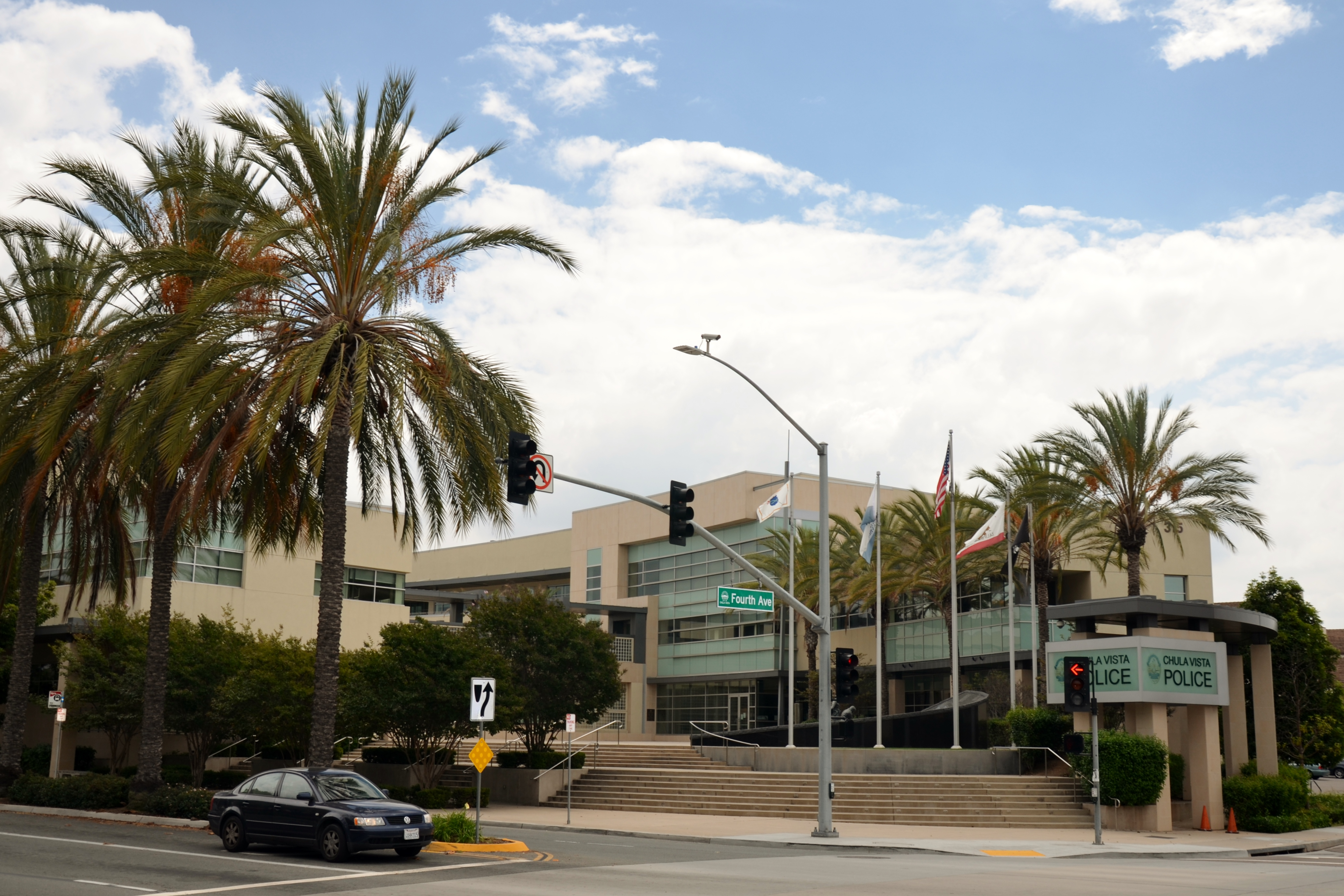
Chula Vista Police Department in 2015

The Chula Vista Police Department is the primary law enforcement agency of Chula Vista, California. Its authorized staffing consists of 283 sworn officers and 114 civilian employees. The Chief of Police is Roxana Kennedy, who is the department's first female chief.

The department is divided into five divisions: The Administrative Services Division, the Patrol Operations Division, the Investigations Division, the Community Engagement Division and the Support Operations Division.

== History ==
The city's police department was threatened with layoffs to help stabilize the department's budget. Although budget cuts saved Chula Vista $18 million, about 100 employees (including 15 police officers) were eliminated.

In October 2018, the department became the first in the country to use drone technology to respond to 911 calls. A 2024 analysis by WIRED of drone flight records from July 2021 to September 2023 found that residents of poorer neighborhoods in Chula Vista were more likely to be exposed to police drone cameras than residents of wealthier neighborhoods.

The article by KPBS covers how AI has begun to be used in police reports in Chula Vista adopting these tools form Axon approved by the City council. This questions credibility in police reports since the original AI generated draft is deleted after review of an officer, and due to AI possibly making mistakes and has brought up some concerns that have caused there to be a bill passed that Governor Gavin Newsom has until mid October to either sign or veto. There are some measures in place. Though viewed as positive by some, many advocates are against this new tool as well as council members like Cesar Fernandez. Now California is moving to possibly adding more regulations to the use of AI in law enforcement.

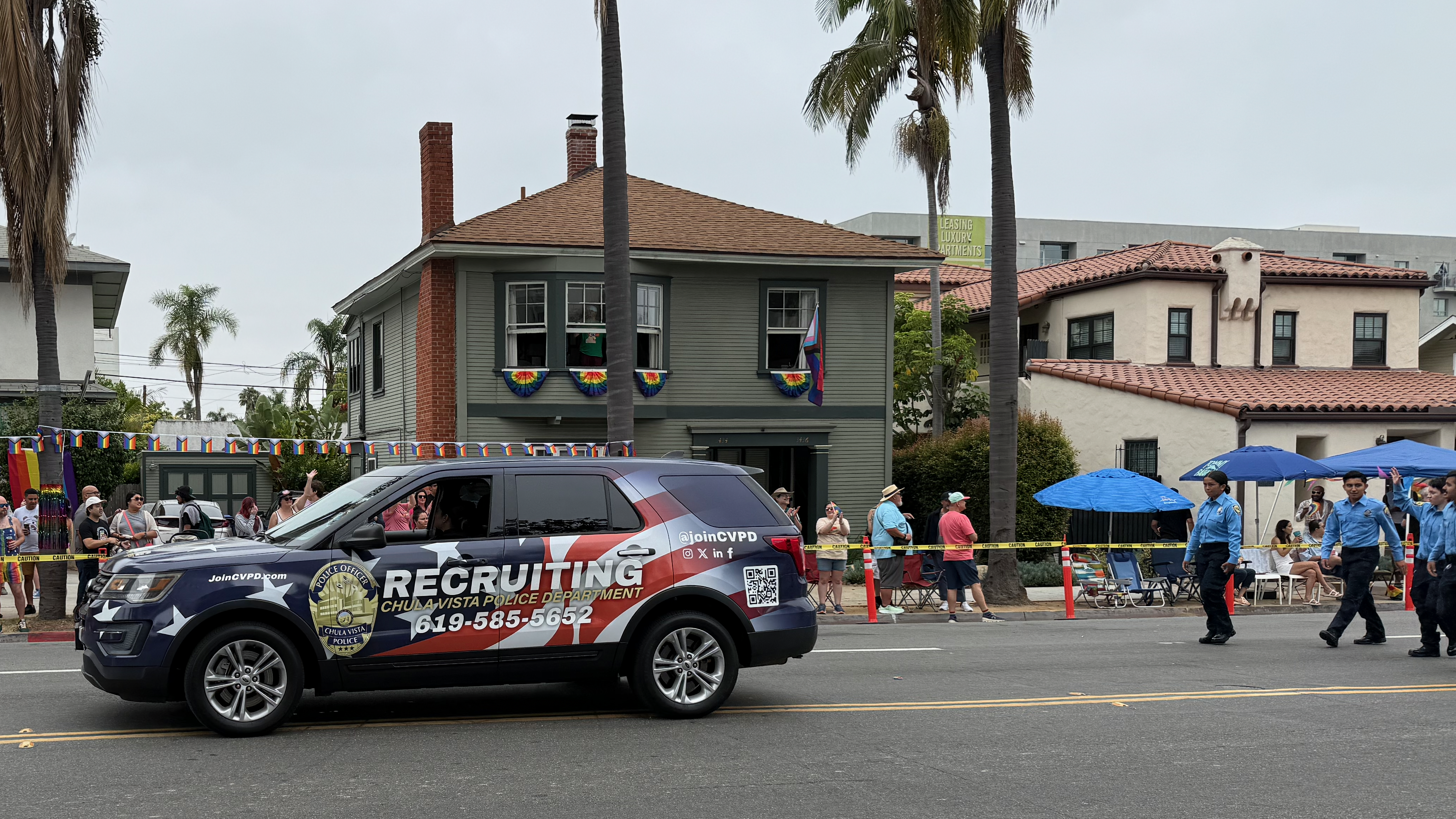
Chula Vista Police Department in the 2025 San Diego Pride parade
