= Leszczydół-Nowiny =

- Village

- Location within Poland
- Coordinates: 52°38′48″N 21°27′50″E
- Country: Poland
- Voivodeship: Masovian
- County: Wyszków
- Gmina: Wyszków
- Population: 1,205

Leszczydół-Nowiny [lɛʂˈt͡ʂɨduu̯ nɔˈvinɨ] is a village in the administrative district of Gmina Wyszków, within Wyszków County, Masovian Voivodeship, in east-central Poland.

== History ==
On 8 October 2026, a school stabbing took place in the primary school of Leszczydół-Nowiny. Two people sustained injuries and a school caretaker was killed in the attack.
