= Supplementary Homicide Reports =

Supplementary Homicide Reports (abbreviated SHR) is a database of homicides in the United States maintained by the Federal Bureau of Investigation (FBI) as part of its Uniform Crime Reports program. The database consists of detailed reports of homicides reported to the FBI by local law enforcement agencies in 49 states and the District of Columbia. The only state that does not participate is Florida, which records homicides in a separate tally that is included in a separate spreadsheet online.

== Reports ==
Each SHR is more detailed than other UCR system reports, because, as Fox & Pierce noted, SHRs include "information about the date, location, circumstances, and method of the offenses and the demographic characteristics of victims and perpetrators."

== Limitations ==
The primary limitation of SHR data is that arising from missing or incomplete reports. Participation in the SHR is voluntary; as a result, many American law enforcement agencies either only intermittently submit SHR forms to the FBI, or do not submit any. In addition to missing homicides, some SHR reports that are filed can be missing information, such as that regarding the victim's age, gender, or race, or regarding the identity of the offender. This missing information can also include the offender's age, gender, or race, which was omitted from 31% of SHR reports filed in 2011.

== Differences from the National Vital Statistics System ==
In 2000, the National Vital Statistics System's homicide estimates exactly matched those of the SHR in 22% of U.S. counties. The National Vital Statistics System (NVSS) generally produced higher estimates than the SHR does, but in 28% of U.S. counties, the opposite was true.
