= 2025 Jakarta school bombing =

Terrorist attack in Indonesia

Jakarta school bombing
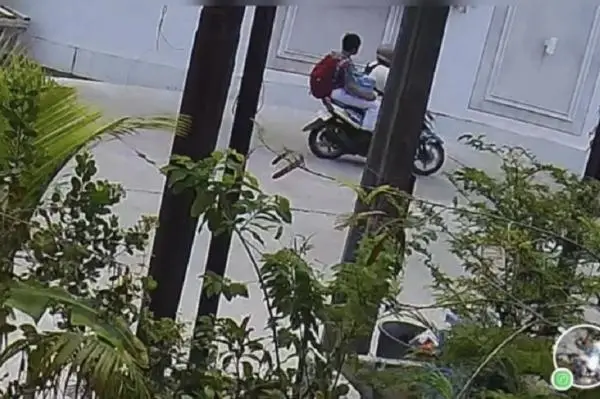
- The suspect going to SMAN 72 with his father, who was driving him to the location via motorcycle.
- Location: 6°09′48″S 106°53′05″E; Inside the mosque of SMA Negeri 72 Jakarta (Public Senior High School 72 Jakarta), Kelapa Gading, Jakarta, Indonesia
- Date: 7 November 2025; 1 year and 3 days ago c. 12.15 p.m. (WIB; UTC+7)
- Target: Congregation during Friday prayer at the school mosque (students and teachers), and later at the canteen
- Attack type: School bombing, attempted suicide bombing,
- Weapons: Several improvised explosive devices; Several homemade pipe bombs; Two airsoft guns (rifle and revolver)
- Deaths: 0
- Injuries: 97 (including the perpetrator)
- Perpetrator: Muhammad Nazriel Fadhel Hidayat
- Motive: Main motives: Revenge against school bullying; Supporting motives: Copying of various, previous far-right terrorism acts; Neo-Nazism; Islamophobia; Misanthropy; Social insecurity and social isolation due to loneliness and dysfunctional family condition

On the afternoon of 7 November 2025, a series of bomb explosions occurred at State High School 72 of Jakarta (SMAN 72 Jakarta), located in Kelapa Gading, North Jakarta, Indonesia. The explosions took place while students and staff were present on campus, injuring 96 people. (Note: See)

== Incident ==
The bombings happened after a sermon just before the Muslim Friday prayer: the first explosion was inside the mosque, and the second in the canteen area. Soon after the incident, the school's area was surrounded and contained by the Mobile Brigade Corps (Brimob) at 1:45 p.m. Western Indonesia Time.

96 people were injured, and they were rushed to different hospitals around Jakarta. Some of them suffered mild burns and cuts from glass shards.

The perpetrator's fate was initially disputed: he was reportedly shot to death at Ganesha Road, around 200 meters from the site, although others claimed that he was killed by one of the bombs. However, it was later confirmed that he was attempting to shoot at students escaping from the roof, but fell down, and later was recovering in hospital and had undergone surgery. He wore a white T-shirt with the words "HATRED” in Russian, in reference to the Kerch polytechnic shooter on it, black pants, and boots during his involvement.

Initial news sources misreported that an explosion came from the public address system, or even gas cylinders within the mosque, based on victims' witness statements.

== Investigation ==
The Deputy Coordinating Minister for Political and Security Affairs Lodewijk Freidrich Paulus stated that an airsoft rifle, a revolver, and a tactical vest were found inside the mosque. The rifle had the names of far-right terrorists, including Brenton Tarrant, Alexandre Bissonnette, and Luca Traini written on it in white. Other terms and imagery on the rifle included the 14 Words, the symbol of the Romanian Iron Guard and the Latvian Waffen SS, and well as Agartha, which is connected to esoteric neo-Nazism. Written on the bolt cover was "Welcome to Hell". His T-shirt had the words "HATRED" written in Russian on the front, a direct reference to Vladislav Roslyakov, the perpetrator of the 2018 Kerch Polytechnic College massacre. He is also known to have an interest in images of weapons and videos with violent themes.

Polda Metro Jaya officially designated one suspect, a 12th-grade student at the school. The suspect is classified as A Child in Conflict with the Law (ABH), meaning they are under 18 and subject to juvenile justice procedures, which focus on rehabilitation and guidance rather than criminal sanctions. On 21 November 2025, Polda Metro Jaya told Antara that the suspect was not yet fit for questioning, saying that he "is still disoriented and occasionally incoherent, showing he has not fully recovered", and that "[a]fter medical clearance, investigators will proceed with formal questioning in coordination with the Probation Office, Social Services, and the Indonesian Child Protection Commission".

A diary belonging to the perpetrator that was confiscated by the police described that constant bullying, social isolation, and his dysfunctional family lead him to spend time on various gore sites and Terrorgram channels where he exposed himself to various right-wing extremist ideologies and communities that celebrated right-wing terrorism and school shootings, particularly the Columbine High School massacre and the Christchurch mosque shootings, and other conspiracy theories and fringe sciences. Police revealed on 20 November 2025, that most of the Telegram channels he followed had been taken down. The diary of the perpetrator recorded his school attack plan and sketches of his school, as well as his fears, trauma, and suicidal ideations.

Polda Metro Jaya stated that the suspect had no links to any terrorist organizations and that the attack had been planned and carried out independently. However, the spokesman of Detachment 88 AKBP, Mayndra Eka Wardana, claimed that four school shooters and three right-wing extremists who perpetrated their own attacks had inspired the perpetrator: Eric Harris and Dylan Klebold, Dylann Roof, Alexandre Bissonnette, Vladislav Roslyakov, Brenton Tarrant, and Natalie Lynn Rupnow (some of whom espoused either white supremacism or neo-Nazism). (Note: Although Eric Harris, Dylan Klebold and Vladislav Roslyakov were exposed to right-wing ideology during the periods before their attacks, the final motives were rather a mix of misanthropy, depression, and a result of constant bullying rather than political motives linking back to Fadhel Nazriel.)

The perpetrator's official motive was revealed by police on 7 February 2026. The perpetrator is Muhammad Nazriel Fadhel Hidayat, a Year-12 student of the school, aged 17. Hidayat suffered from bullying by his peers prior to the bombing, with his bullies being aware of his family situation and other "private life aspects." Hidayat's friendships with several female peers rather than male peers also resulted in him being called a sissy along with other insults towards him and his family.

== Aftermath ==
=== Initial reactions ===
The alleged perpetrator is a Year-12 student of the said school, aged 17 years old, referred to only as "F" (no full name has been released by the authorities) in Indonesian reports. The Atlantic later named him as Muhammad Nazriel Fadhel Hidayat. He is known in school to have a quiet personality and is regarded as a loner. He is also known to have an interest in far-right ideologies, terrorism, images of weapons and videos depicting gore.

This incident sparked concern from various parties, including the Ministry of Primary and Secondary Education and the local government of Jakarta. A psychological recovery team was deployed to provide support to traumatized students, teachers, and school staff. Authorities urged the public not to spread speculation and to await the results of the official police investigation. Minister of State Secretary Prasetyo Hadi said that President Prabowo Subianto expressed deep concern over the incident and stressed the importance of taking swift action to ensure the safety of the victims. Prabowo Subianto, through State Secretary Prasetyo Hadi, stated that the government was considering restrictions on video games featuring weapons, which were considered a contributing factor to the bombing. Prasetyo referred to the game PUBG: Battlegrounds as being dangerous for children. The minister of Communication and Digital Affairs Meutya Hafid said that the results of the Komdigi team's study found elements of violence and crime in the game.

=== Post-bombing investigations ===
On 23 December 2025, a teenager was arrested in Garut, West Java for harboring both far right-extremist and/or far left-extremist ideologies and spreading bomb-making, weapon-making, and bullet-making materials. He spread the materials in a far-right terrorist Whatsapp-based group and had successfully manufactured bombs and bullets, which were confiscated by the police. Locals revealed that the captured teenager was "gifted and a genius", speaking 7 languages, mostly talking in Japanese and Arabic. While the connection to the Jakarta school bomber has yet to be linked, both have espoused similar Neo-Nazi views and ideologies and capabilities for bomb-making.

On 28 December 2025, based on his research and findings, Al Chaidar, a terrorism researcher from Malikussaleh University, estimated that the Neo-Nazi network in Indonesia is around 300 men strong and almost all are under 17 years old, which he noted as strategy for their Neo-Nazi terror recruiters so the future attackers cannot be criminalized or put into adult judiciary if they committed the acts as "juvenile terrorists", and are thus given much lesser sentences. Al Chaidar urged the government to expand their deradicalization program to not only cover Islamic terrorism, but also other dangerous extreme ideologies. He also recommended a government ideological mapping program to be developed further to map such extreme ideologies as the government did for Islamist extremism.

On 30 December 2025, criminologists of the National Counter Terrorism Agency (BNPT) voiced similar concerns and requests for the BNPT to increase concerns regarding far-right terrorism, despite the reluctance of the BNPT to classify the incident as terrorism. According to the BNPT, the attack lacked the organization and features of terrorism to classify it as such when compared to Islamic terrorism, which is more common in Indonesia.

Following investigation into the Jakarta school bomber's internet circles, on 30 December 2025, police revealed there were 68 children and teenagers from 18 provinces also connected to him through a Telegram community named the "True Crime Community", where they were exposed to white supremacism and Neo-Nazi ideologies. Police also revealed that 20 planned school attacks subsequent to the Jakarta school bombing had been foiled by Densus 88 cyber patrols and proactive preventions. Police also uncovered 5 individuals that formed an unnamed Neo-Nazi network, which planned to indoctrinate 110 children and teenagers from 23 provinces by recruiting them through the Telegram community and violent video games.

On 7 January 2026, the Police announced that 70 children and teenagers from 19 provinces were discovered to have connections to Neo-Nazi and far-right extremist ideologies through various groups associated with Terrorgram. 27 of them were located in Jakarta and West Java. Their ages ranged from 11 to 18, with the majority of them being 7th to 9th graders. All were capable of creating makeshift weaponry and pipe bombs and were also capable of arming themselves for sudden attacks. Some had already created plans for attacks on schools, involving methods such as mapping and disabling CCTV systems, planting bombs in classrooms, and how to kill their own classmates and teachers. One suspect was able to produce detailed manuals and tutorials for bomb-making in English. As they are juveniles and had yet to carry out any attacks, Police chose to assess, map, and send them for counselling as a preventive measures. On the same day, Police found the connection between the bombing with Odintsovo school attack that happened on 16 December 2025. On the knife handle used by the Timofey Kulyamov, perpetrator of Odintsovo school attack, the words "2025 Jakarta Bombing" were written, referring the Jakarta school bombing.

On 7 January 2026, the police also announced a list of 27 Indonesian Neo-Nazi Terrorgram circles.

Sources also said, Indonesian neo-Nazi circles has connections with Malaysian neo-Nazi far-right groups such as Nusantarist, Malay Power 1388, Darah & Maruah Tanah Melayu and Nusantarawingism. Including few of the infamous Malaysian Neo-Nazi activists, Karl, Zordiel, Alek, who promoted anti-Rohingya sentiments and Malay supremacism online.

=== Subsequent attacks ===
On 3 February 2026, a 9th-grader junior high school student at SMPN 3 Sungai Raya, Sungai Raya, Kubu Raya, West Kalimantan, committed an arson attack in the school yard using a molotov cocktail during free lunch time. No casualties were reported. In his backpack were various symbols, numerology (likely referencing the number of victims in various mass-casualty events), sigils, and names of previous attackers, such as Adam Lanza, Seung-Hui Cho, Salvador Rolando Ramos, Timur Bekmansurov, Luca Traini, incel-misogynist murderer Elliot Rodger, Orlando attacker Omar Mateen, Las Vegas attacker Stephen Paddock, and the 2019 Sri Lanka Easter bombings mastermind Zahran Hashim. The school bomber also connected with the same "True Crime Community" Neo-Nazi Terrorgram circle like the previous SMAN 72 Jakarta bomber. Authorities noted while the suspect's behaviour was normal at school, they believed he had mental issues related to his familial situation, as his father and grandfather had illnesses.

On 14 July 2026, a 12th-grader senior high student bombed his own school, MAN 3 Padang, Koto Tangah, Padang, West Sumatera using an IED and resulted in destruction of a classroom. The attack inspired from Jakarta school bombing. The motive also similar: constant bullying of perpetrator. Police secured the perpetrator and other 3 unexploded IEDs.

== See also ==
- List of attacks related to secondary schools
- Lists of school-related attacks
- Juvenile delinquency
- Gîsca school bombing
- Poe Elementary School bombing
