= Mass stabbing =

Knife-enabled crime harming multiple victims

A mass stabbing is a single incident in which multiple victims are injured or killed with a sharp object thrust at the victims, piercing through the skin and injuring the victims. Examples of sharp instruments used in mass stabbings may include kitchen knives, utility knives, sheath knives, scissors, katanas, icepicks, bayonets, axes, machetes and glass bottles. Knife crime poses security threats to many countries around the world.

There are many different factors that could lead to a mass stabbing. This may include social inequality, abuse of alcohol and other drugs, easy access to weapons, social and cultural norms, religious and political reasons, among others.

Many actions have been taken to address mass stabbing and knife crimes. This may include enacting new legislation, social and education programs, medical interventions, among others. However, mass stabbing and similar terrorist attacks carried out by Islamic extremists have resulted in the rise of Islamophobia.

== Definition ==
A mass stabbing can be defined from a number of different perspectives. The Oxford English Dictionary defines the verb 'stab' as an action that propels a pointed weapon with the intention of harm or murder. A mass stabbing is an incident involving the use of pointed weapons to wound or kill multiple people.

Mass stabbings can be looked at from the scope of knife crime. Based on a publication by the Parliament of the United Kingdom, 'knife-enabled crime' is an incident where harm is threatened or caused with the use of bladed weapons. The media also refers to 'knife crime' as a stabbing incident or the illegal possession of knives by a person in the public.

From a legal perspective, the phrase mass killing can be used to define a mass stabbing. Based on section 2 of the Investigative Assistance for Violent Crimes Act of 2012 of the United States of America, which was signed into law and published by the US Congress on 13 January 2013, 'mass killing' is an individual occasion with three or more people murdered.

Mass stabbings can also be looked at from the perspective of mass murder. The Federal Bureau of Investigation (FBI) of the United States of America has defined mass murder as an incident where four or more people are killed in a single incident on a continuing basis without any significant time period in between each of the murders.

Mass murder as a violent crime in a civilian setting is mostly examined through mass shootings. An examination of Supplementary Homicide Reports by USA Today recorded that "nearly one third" of mass murder incidents in the United States between 2006 and 2016 were committed using weapons including knives; the remainder were by shooting. James Alan Fox wrote that as a result of a larger focus on mass shootings in regards to the political gun control debate in the US, there is less research and data regarding knife-enabled mass murders.

Jack Levin reasoned that blades and blunt weapons were unreliable in killing a large number of people simultaneously due to a lack of "mass destructive" capability, also noting that potential victims had to be within close range, enabling them to also physically engage the perpetrator. The view was held that knife attacks resulted in death in smaller numbers and in fewer cases when compared to mass shootings.

== Causes ==
A World Health Organization (WHO) report states that past victimisation is one of the risk factors causing violence. Children and young people with adverse experiences are particularly prone to being perpetrators or victims of violence.

Abuse of alcohol is another risk factor that causes people, particularly young people to engage in violence such as knife crime. Research by WHO found that the incidence of violence was higher in countries with greater ease of access to alcohol. Similarly, drug abuse is another possible cause of knife crime. Illicit drug trade has been linked to the increasing incidence of knife crime. Examples of drugs that are particularly linked to acts of violence include tobacco, cocaine and amphetamines.

WHO has also stated that there is a strong correlation between violence and social inequality and deprivation. The larger the differences in income between the high-income group and the low-income group, the higher the incidence of homicides.

Another factor that may have led to knife crimes and violence among young people is the social and cultural norms in the environment they are exposed to. This may be due to the exposure of young people to violent behaviour of family members, friends or other members of society, which lead them to think that acts of violence are normal and acceptable. This group of people may have been exposed to various contents containing different forms of violence in the mass media which may have affected the behaviour of the young people.

Spreading of religious extremism by terrorist groups, such as al-Qaeda and Islamic State of Iraq and the Levant (IS), may be another cause of mass stabbings. Both terrorist groups used publications such as Dabiq of IS and Inspire of al-Qaeda to propagate the ideologies of the organisations and demonize their opponents, particularly the western democracy and their values. The terrorist organisations have encouraged their followers to launch attacks with knives because it is a cheap and easy method which is difficult to be detected by authorities yet capable of causing great harm to the general public.

Mass stabbing incidents are more common in nations that restrict or ban the private ownership of firearms. Individuals who do not have access to firearms typically turn to other weapons in order to inflict harm. In nations with strict firearms regulation such as the United Kingdom and Japan, knives are the most commonly used weapon to commit murder. In 2021 through 2022, the Home Office of the United Kingdom reported that England and Wales saw 282 homicides committed with a knife compared to 35 homicides committed with a firearm in the same year. In the United States, firearms are most commonly used by people looking to inflict harm due to their wide availability and ease of access in many states. Of the 15,129 homicides committed in the US in 2017, 10,982 involved a firearm while 1,591 homicides involved a knife or cutting instrument. These factors make mass shootings in the United States a far more common incident than mass stabbings or acts of mass violence committed by other means. Pro-gun lawmakers such as Brad Wenstrup have cited mass stabbings in other countries to argue against measures to limit firearms ownership, arguing that mass murderers will still try to commit their attacks using knives or other means including bombs and vehicles instead of firearms.

Political reasons may be another cause of mass stabbings. Various studies have been conducted by scholars and researchers to examine the relationship between political repression and terrorism. In general, there is a lack of consensus on the relationship between repression and violence. Some studies argued that political repression may turn non-violent groups to acts of violence. However, another study showed that there was a positive correlation between repression and violence in the short-run, but the correlation turns negative in the long-run.

== Reactions ==
=== Government and law enforcement ===
The Government of the United Kingdom announced on 31 January 2019 that they would introduce the Knife Crime Prevention Orders through an amendment to the Offensive Weapons Bill in conjunction with the government's effort in tackling knife crime. The new preventative order can be placed on any person aged 12 or over, where curfews, geographical restrictions and social media restrictions may be imposed on the targets of the police. Retailers are also forbidden from selling knives to any person aged 18 or below. The law is aimed at reducing knife crimes especially among young people. Criminal prosecution, fines or jail sentences may be applied on any person who breaches the law.

Pressure from the public and changes in laws have also mandated tougher sentences from the judiciary on knife crime offences. England and Wales saw 85% of their knife crime offenders jailed for at least three months. The average jail sentence for these offenders was eight months in 2018, an increment of three months from the average a decade ago. In Scotland, there was a threefold increase in average sentence for carrying a knife in 2015 when compared to the data from 10 years ago.

Members of the law enforcement community has also lobbied the government for extra funding to tackle crimes. The Government of the United Kingdom has also announced extra funding of £100m to security forces in England and Wales to tackle crimes, specifically knife crimes.

Countries like Brazil and Australia have also introduced laws to restrict the sale of alcohol at specific times of a day. Studies in Diadema, Brazil has shown that homicides were reduced by 44% in the course of three years with the introduction of a law that restricts trading hours for alcoholic products.

In China, mass stabbing attacks are widely censored.

=== Schools ===
Schools have also taken precautionary measure to prevent knife crime in school compounds. A WHO report states that creating safe learning environment in schools is critical in preventing violence and knife crime among young people.

A direct approach taken by some schools in the United States of America was installing weapon detection systems in schools. This is to prevent weapons such as guns and knives from being brought into schools and threaten the safety of the community.

Another initiative taken by some schools is the introduction of bully-prevention programs in schools. An example of such programs is the Olweus Program, which is originated from Norway and is currently implemented in Australia, Lithuania, the Netherlands, the United Kingdom and the United States of America. The KiVa program in Finland is another successful anti-bullying program in Europe.

Education programs aimed at reducing knife crime has also been introduced. For example, the Be Safe Project in the United Kingdom educates students about the legal, social and health implications of knife crime.

=== Others ===
In Scotland, knife crime is treated as a public health issue and a public funded initiative was launched to address the root cause of knife crimes. The initiative is participated by law enforcement agencies like the police, social services and other organisations. For example, No Knives, Better Lives, an organisation launched in 2009, works with the Scottish police, schools and volunteers to raise awareness among young people on knife crime prevention. Gang members were also invited to a meeting with the police, health professionals, victims and social service workers where they discussed the implications of knife crime and violence. They were offered with assistance in employment, housing and education to help them depart from violence and knife crime.

Parenting programs were launched in many countries around the world to improve parenting skills. WHO has stated that interventions in parenting skills can be beneficial to parent-children relationship and prevent violence amongst young people. Examples of parenting programs includes Nurse-Family Partnership, Triple P and The Incredible Years.

=== Rise of Islamophobia ===
Some scholars and experts believe that knife crime, mass stabbing and terrorist attacks have caused a surge in Islamophobia.

Based on a report by Tell Mama, there was a 26% increase in anti-Muslim attacks in the United Kingdom from 2017 to 2018. Some experts have attributed the backlash against the Islamic religion and Muslims to the terrorist attacks in the United Kingdom which were carried out by Muslims. Example of terrorist attacks in the United Kingdom include Manchester Arena Bombing, London Bridge attack and Westminster attack. All of the attacks happened in the United Kingdom in 2017.

Another research from California State University, San Bernardino, has found that there was a 78% rise in hate crimes against Muslims in the United States of America in 2015. Police reports in 2016 also stated that hate crimes and violence against Muslim communities in the United States of America were on the rise.

=== Research on pedestrian dynamics in mass stabbing scenarios ===
Recent research on pedestrian dynamics during mass stabbing incidents offers practical guidelines to enhance public safety. The study introduced a model to delineate the direct threat zone of pedestrians, quantifying potential threats. The research found that pedestrians' expected speed positively correlates with the intensity of potential threats. When threatened, individuals initially move faster, but their speed decreases once they are beyond a certain range from the threat. Through experiments in various scenarios, results showed that setting up multiple exits helps avoid congestion, and clear pathways ensure evacuees can better evade attackers. These insights suggest that public spaces should be designed with multiple accessible exits, and the public should be guided to evacuate quickly and calmly to reduce casualties in such incidents.
