= Timeline of crimes involving the True Crime Community =

Series of copycat crimes

The True Crime Community (TCC), an online fandom and subculture with an obsessive interest in true crime, particularly serial killers and high-profile mass murderers has been linked to shootings, stabbings, bombings, threats, arrests, legal actions and other events in various countries. Analysts have identified copycat pattern within the TCC, in which attacks can generate increased activity, particularly when perpetrators have participated in TCC spaces. The notoriety gained by previous attackers has encouraged other members to carry out their own attacks.

This copycat pattern was particularly notable following the 2024 Abundant Life Christian School shooting in Wisconsin, after which the perpetrator, 15-year-old Natalie Rupnow, became notorious in the TCC. Her prominence was further amplified when the perpetrators of the 2025 Antioch High School shooting and the 2025 Annunciation Catholic Church shooting referenced her before their attacks. According to research by the Institute for Strategic Dialogue (ISD), TCC-linked attacks has caused more than eleven fatalities and left 45 others wounded from 2024–2025.

== Timeline ==
Included events:

- Attacks (shootings, stabbings, bombings)
- Plots
- Arrests
- Legal actions

=== 2007 ===
==== November ====
- 7 November – Pekka-Eric Auvinen massacred eight people at Jokela High School before committing suicide. Auvinen had a YouTube channel centered on the Columbine High School massacre.

=== 2012 ===
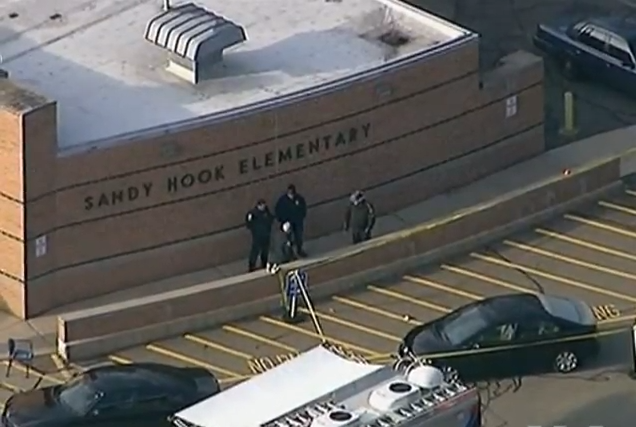
Police at the scene of the Sandy Hook Elementary School shooting

==== December ====
- 14 December – The Sandy Hook Elementary School shooting occurred in Newtown Connecticut, United States, leaving 26 people dead, including 20 children. The shooter was a member of the TCC.

=== 2017 ===
==== June ====
- 8 June – Randy Stair opened fire in the Weis Markets supermarket in Eaton Township, Pennsylvania, United States and killed 4 people including himself. He had previously praised the Columbine shooters online and was an active user to online forums dedicated to the Columbine High School massacre.

=== 2021 ===
==== August ====
- 19 August - Hugo Jackson entered Källeberg school in Eslöv, Sweden, and attacked a teacher with a knife, resulting in injuries, Hugo was inspired by attacks such as the 1999 Columbine High School massacre, the 2019 Halle shooting and the 2019 Christchurch mosque shootings, taking such inspiration from the latter two, that he livestreamed his own attack via Twitch just like they did, though the stream itself is considered lost media, and only screenshots remain publicly available.

=== 2022 ===
==== July ====
- 3 July – 22-year-old Noah Esbensen carried out a mass shooting at a mall in Copenhagen, Denmark, killing three people and wounding seven others. Prior to the attack, he uploaded YouTube videos that referenced well-known figures within the TCC and had an interest in American mass murderers.

=== 2023 ===
==== October ====
- 3 October – A mass shooting at the the Siam Paragon mall in Bangkok, Thailand leaving three people dead. The shooting became the first TCC-linked incident in Southeast Asia.

=== 2024 ===
==== January ====
- 4 January – Dylan Butler opened fire in a high school in Perry, Iowa, killing two and injuring seven before committing suicide. A Discord account linked to Butler was active in a Discord chat dedicated to discussing school shootings.

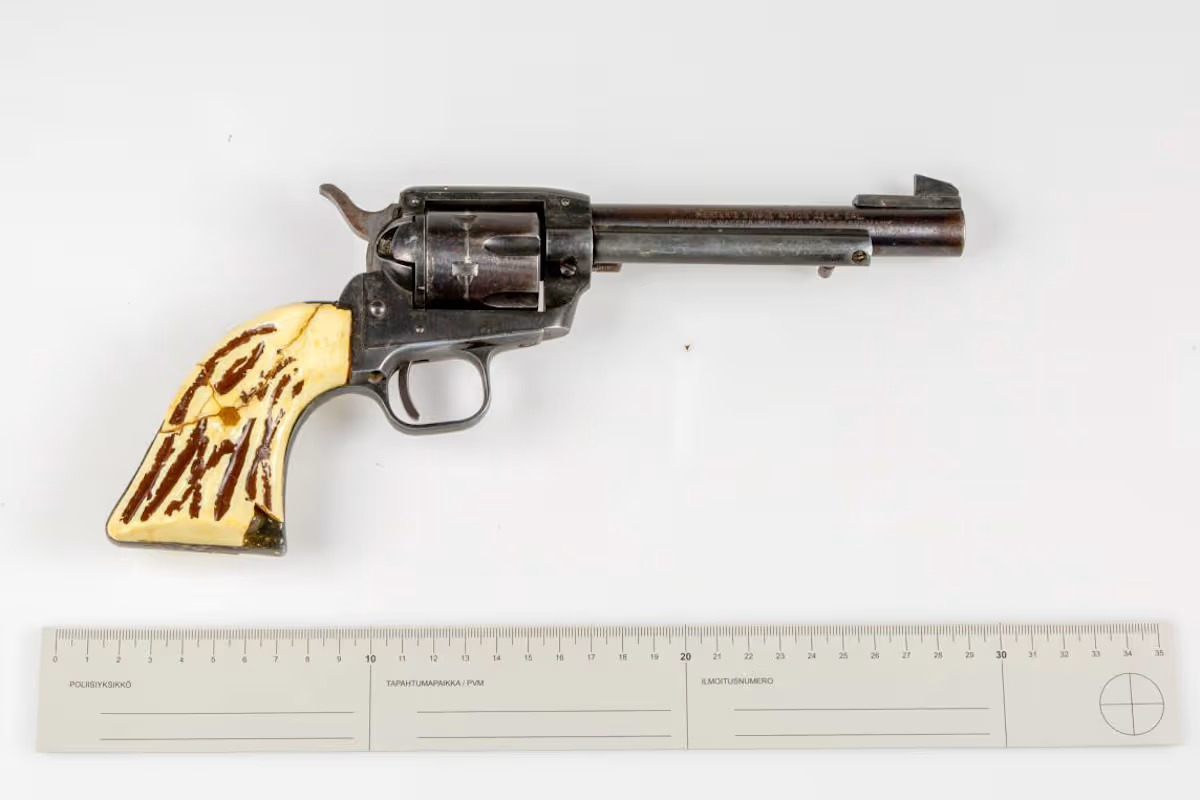
The revolver used in the Vantaa school shooting, a .22 caliber Herter's Waseca single-action revolver.

==== March ====
- 6 March – A man attacked three people with an axe on the campus of the UTEG University Center, killing two women and injuring a man. Prior to this, the perpetrator had murdered a woman at a motel in the same city. The attacker was part of a virtual community dedicated to venerating violent crimes, which may have inspired him, but authorities dont clarify the reason why the aggressor chose that particular campus.

==== April ====
- 2 April – A shooting occurred at a school in Vantaa, Finland. The gunman, a 12-year-old fired a revolver at three students, killing one and injuring two others. Prior to the attack, the 12-year-old researched school shooters and mass murderers online.

==== August ====
- 5 August – Gabriel Alejandro Galaviz González, attacker of the Technological University of Guadalajara incident took his life after intentionally jumping from a height of approximately six meters from a balcony, resulting in a traumatic brain injury (TBI) and subsequent ring of heart attacks.
- 12 August – 18-year-old Arda Küçükyetim carried out a livestreamed mass stabbing attack near a mosque in Eskişehir, Turkey, injuring five people. Küçükyetim admired various mass killers, referring to some of them as "saints".

==== September ====
- 4 September – The 14-year-old Colt Gray opened fire at Apalachee High School near Winder, Georgia, killing four and injuring nine. Gray was involved in the TCC.
- 13 September – Nicholas Prosper killed his mother and two siblings at their home in Luton, England. Prosper was fascinated by murderers, school shooters, and rapists.

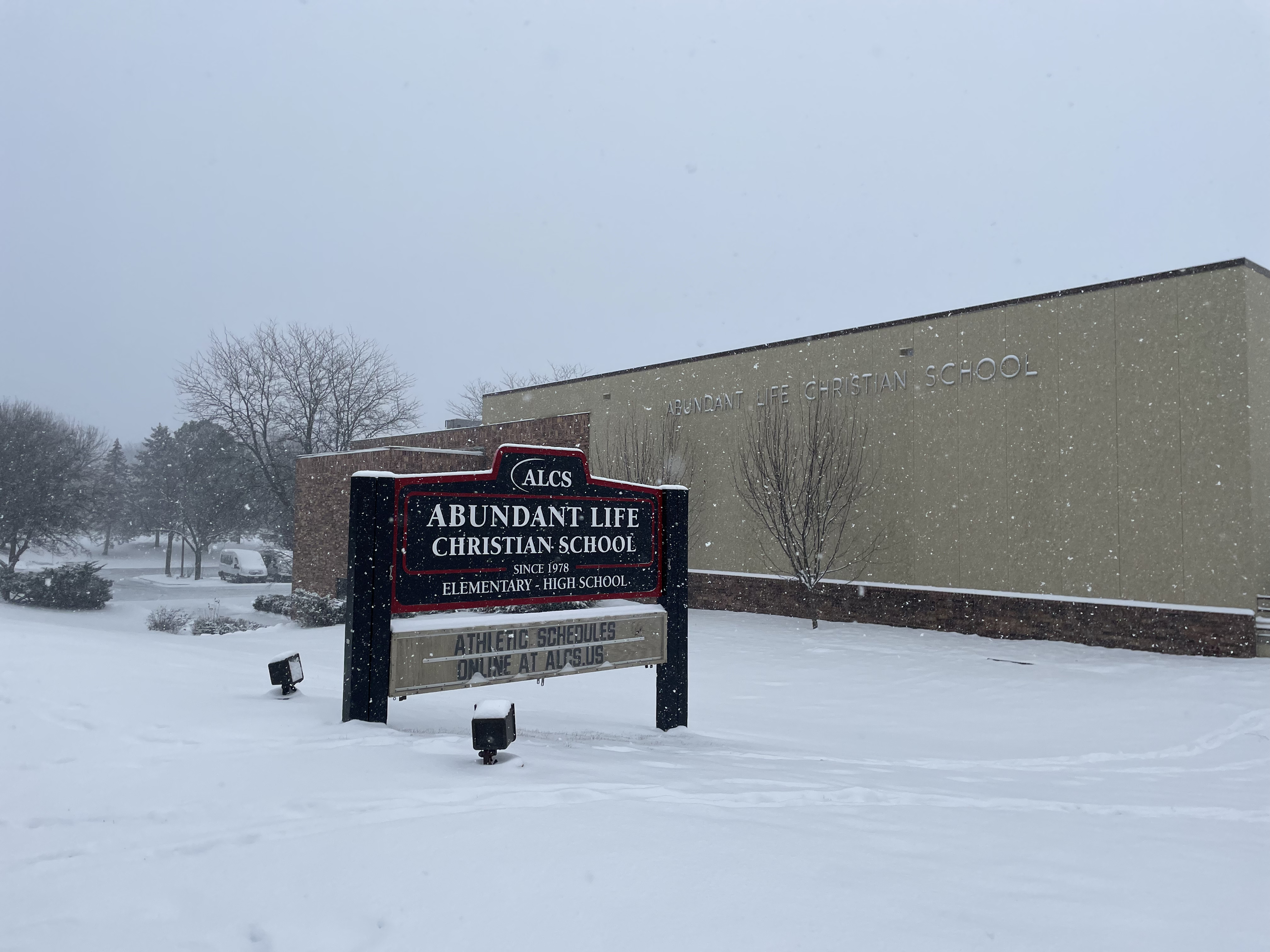
The Abundant Life Christian School, a K–12 school in Madison, Dane County, Wisconsin, United States was the site of a notorious; TCC-linked mass shooting.

==== December ====
- 16 December – Two people were killed and six others were injured during a school shooting in the Abundant Life Christian School in Madison, Wisconsin, United States. According to the Institute for Strategic Dialogue, the shooter was motivated by her involvement in the TCC and nihilistic violent extremism.

=== 2025 ===
==== January ====
- 22 January – Solomon Henderson opened fire at Antioch High School in Nashville, Tennessee killing one person and wounding another before committing suicide. Henderson was a member of the TCC and shared his manifesto that showed an interest in violence and extremism.

==== June ====
- 11 June – A 21-year-old man only identified as Arthur A. opened fire at Dreierschützengasse High School in Graz, Austria, killing ten people before committing suicide. The shooting was linked to the TCC, based on the perpetrator's fascination with prior mass shootings.

==== September ====
- 9 September – A 12-year-old girl attacked a woman with an axe and knife at a secondary school in Delicias, Chihuahua, Mexico. The 12-year-old girl identified as a member of the TCC.
- 10 September – A 16-year-old student, Desmond Holly, shot and critically injured two students before killing himself in Evergreen High School in Evergreen, Colorado, United States. Holly was involved in the TCC.
- 24 September – Arda Küçükyetim, the perpetrator of the 2024 Eskişehir stabbing, is sentenced to 75 years and 5 months imprisonment.

==== October ====
- 9 October – At a Assesment Center in Marikina, Philippines, a 14 Year old Student killed another student with a knife and a AR style rifle before killing himself, the student has claimed in a TCC Discord server where he posted his plan.[32]
- 15 October – At a high school in Selangor, Malaysia, a student stabbed and killed another student. The suspect made references to several school shootings in the United States and was inspired by the Columbine High School massacre.

==== November ====
- 7 November – A bombing at Sekolah Menengah Atas Negeri 72 in Jakarta, Indonesia, injured 97 people, including the perpetrator. The perpetrator was involved in the TCC.

==== December ====
- 16 December – Timofey Kulyamov filmed a racially motivated mass stabbing at a Odintsovo, Russia, killing a 10 year old Tajik child and wounding four. The assaliant referenced Eric Harris, Dylann Roof, Brenton Tarrant, and Anders Behring Breivik.

=== 2026 ===
==== February ====
- 3 February – A Molotov cocktail attack in the SMP Negeri 3 Sungai Raya in Kubu Raya Regency, Indonesia, left one student injuried. The Densus 88 spokesperson Police Commissioner Mayndra Eka Wardhana confirmed that the attacker carried Molotov cocktails, improvised fire crackers and a backpack, there were various symbols, numerology , sigils, and the names of previous school attackers such as Adam Lanza, Seung-Hui Cho, Salvador Rolando Ramos, and Timur Bekmansurov, the Pulse nightclub shooter Omar Mateen, incel-misogynist killer Elliot Rodger, Las Vegas attacker Stephen Paddock, and Brenton Tarrant.

==== March ====
- 24 March – A school shooting at a high school in Lázaro Cárdenas, Mexico, leaves two female teachers dead. Prior to the attack, the suspected attacker, a 15-year-old boy, referenced the Columbine High School massacre, the Sandy Hook Elementary School shooting, Charles Manson, and Marc Lépine.
- 25 March – A school stabbing in Trescore Balneario, Italy left one teacher with injuries. The suspected attacker, a 13-year-old student, was involved with the TCC and No Lives Matter (NLM).
- 30 March – A school shooting occurred at Escuela Normal Mariano Moreno No. 40 in San Cristóbal, Santa Fe, Argentina, one person is killed and eight others are injured. The perpetrator was involved in TCC on Discord and referenced the Columbine High School massacre.

==== April ====
- 15 April – A 16-year-old boy allegedly set fire to a storage shed and wrote “RIP Adam Lanza”, at an elementary school in Bethesda, Maryland. The suspect's social media account indicated he was involved in the TCC.
- 20 April – 27-year-old Julio César Jasso Ramírez, opened fire on the Teotihuacán pyramids in Mexico, killing one tourist and injuring thirteen others before committing suicide. Jasso was involved in the TCC.

==== May ====
- 18 May – 17-year-old Cain Lee Clark and 18-year-old Caleb Liam Vazquez, fatally shot three people at a mosque in San Diego, California, United States. Both of the shooters were members of the TCC.
- 29 May – A 12-year-old student in San Vito Lo Capo attempted to stab his teacher in a classroom. During the attack he wore a bicycle helmet covered in handwritten references to the TCC.

==== June ====
- 22 June – A shooting occurred at a library in Chico, California, killing two people. During the shooting, the suspected attacker wore T-shirt bearing the words "Natural Selection", a reference to the Columbine High School massacre.
- 25 June – During his court appearance, the suspected Chico library attacker made an “OK” hand gesture below his waist, a symbol commonly seen in TCC spaces.
- 29 June – Arda Küçükyetim, the perpetrator of the 2024 Eskişehir stabbing, committed suicide in his prison cell.

==== July ====
- 8 July – A 16-year-old boy carried out a stabbing attack at a high school in Schongau, Bavaria, Germany, leaving two girls critically injured. A manifesto written by the perpetrator contained incel ideology, far-right themes, and praised previous attackers, including Brenton Tarrant, Adam Lanza, and a 15-year-old that killed a student in Argentina.
- 13 July – A 12-year-old stabbed a 5-year-old girl in Furutorpsparken, Helsingborg, Sweden. The 12-year-old's TikTok glorified school shooters.
- 17 July – Osmer H. the perpetrator of the 2026 Lázaro Cárdenas school shooting was sentenced to three years' incarceration (the maximum permissible under Michoacán's specialized code of adolescent justice, to be served at a juvenile facility in the state capital, Morelia) under the charges of feminicide and carrying a firearm reserved for the exclusive use of the Army,

as well as the compensation of 3,280,769 pesos in restitution to the victims' families.

==== August ====
- 21 August – An 18-year-old student carried out a sword attack at a school in Fagersta, Sweden, killing one and wounding three others. The TikTok account linked to the suspect was active in the TCC.

==== September ====
- 18 September:
  - A 9th grade student named Lucky Jeanrich Lope opened fire at Banga National High School in Banga, South Cotabato, Philippines. Three people were killed, including the perpetrator, and eight people were injured. The shooter was a member of the TCC.
  - A 13-year-old Italian student livestreamed himself attacking a 66-year-old teacher with a knife at a middle school in Rome. The attacker was linked to the TCC and was inspired by various mass murderers, including Brenton Tarrant.
- 24 September – A 13-year-old schoolboy stabbed a girl during a physical education class in Växjö, Sweden. After the attack he posted a video on Tiktok where he thanked the TCC.

==== October ====
- 1 October – Two brothers influenced by the TCC attacked the facilities of the Secundaria General No. 13 in Ejido La Unión, Torreon, Coahuila, México under the pretext of request information. The stabbing attack left one teacher killed and four students and teachers injuried, as well as both attackers, who were subdued and beaten by neighbors who were alerted by the sound of firecrackers and the screams of a students.
- 12 October – A 14-year-old student, with links to the TCC, opened fire with a hunting shotgun at a school in Aubagne, France, wounding three.
- 13 October – A teenager attacked a six-year-old girl at a church-run school in Umhlali, South Africa. He claimed inspiration from the TCC.
- 14 October – The Aubagne shooter is charged with "attempted murder in connection with a terrorist enterprise" and "terrorist criminal conspiracy."
- 16 October – According to France's Interior Minister, Laurent Nuñez, "a few dozen" young people linked to the TCC are under surveillance.
- 19 October – A mass stabbing occurred at a school in Bistrița-Năsăud County, Bistrița, Romania, three people were injured, including the perpertrator. Prosecutors noted that the attacker targeted specific individuals out of racial hatred, and was active within digital fringe spaces such as online true crime and extremist communities.

== See also ==
- Timeline of crimes involving the Order of Nine Angles
- Isla Vista attacks copycat crimes
- Columbine High School massacre copycat crimes
