= List of school shootings in the United States (2020s) =

This chronological list of school shootings in the United States in the 2020s includes school shootings in the United States that occurred at K–12 public and private schools, as well as at colleges and universities, and on school buses. Included in shootings are non-fatal accidental shootings. Excluded from this list are:

1. Incidents that occurred as a result of police actions
2. Murder–suicides by rejected suitors or estranged spouses
3. Suicides or suicide attempts involving only one person.
4. Shootings by school staff, where the only victims are other employees that are covered at workplace killings.

== Number of US school shootings by year with casualties ==
Year	Total number of shootings	Total number dead (including the shooters)	Total number wounded (including the shooters)	Total mass murders (4 or more deaths, not including the shooters)
2020	22	15	13	0
2021	37	19	62	1
2022	55	50	98	1
2023	60	39	61	1
2024	63	28	83	1
2025	71	36	111	0
2026				
Total	294	180	412	4

== 2020 ==
22 incidents.

Date	Location	Deaths	Injuries	Total	Description
January 8, 2020	Belle Glade, Florida	0	1	1	An individual who was not a student accidentally shot himself in the leg in the parking lot of Glades Central High School.
January 11, 2020	Dallas, Texas	1	1	2	A 15-year-old was arrested after two people were wounded by gunfire during a fight at a high school basketball game between South Oak Cliff and Kimball High School. An 18-year-old man was badly wounded in the shooting, and a bullet fragment grazed a Dallas ISD police officer. The 15-year-old shooter, who turned himself in at Dallas police headquarters, was initially charged with aggravated assault; however, after the 18-year-old student died from his injuries, the shooter was charged with murder. The shooter was sentenced to 15 years in prison in a plea deal.
January 14, 2020	Bellaire, Texas	1	0	1	A 19-year-old student was shot in the chest and killed at Bellaire High School. A 16-year-old student was arrested and convicted of manslaughter and was sentenced to 12 years in prison.
January 14, 2020	Fort Worth, Texas	0	2	2	An adult male and a 10-year-old child were injured at North Crowley Ninth Grade Campus after a youth basketball game.
January 17, 2020	Howell, Michigan	0	1	1	A father accidentally shot himself while in the Three Fires Elementary School parking lot and was picking up his child when his gun went off by mistake when the man was adjusting himself inside his car.
January 23, 2020	Oxnard, California	0	1	1	A stray bullet fired during a street altercation struck a 9-year-old student at McAuliffe Elementary School.
January 23, 2020	Saint Thomas, U.S. Virgin Islands	0	0	0	A woman fired two shots in the air at the Antilles School before pointing her gun at another woman.
January 31, 2020	Antioch, California	1	0	1	A 16-year-old student was killed after a large fight broke out after a basketball game at Deer Valley High School.
February 3, 2020	Commerce, Texas	2	1	3	Jacques Dshawn Smith, 21, gained access to Pride Rock Residence hall at Texas A&M University–Commerce, where he is suspected of shooting his ex-girlfriend Abbaney Matts, 20, and her sister Deja Matts, 19, to death. Abbaney's two-year-old son was also injured during the shooting. Smith pled guilty and was sentenced to life in prison plus 35 years.
February 4, 2020	Baton Rouge, Louisiana	1	0	1	A 22-year-old employee of the Louisiana Culinary Institute was killed in the institute's parking lot by the ex-boyfriend of his girlfriend. The ex-boyfriend was later arrested and claimed he did not know the weapon was loaded and planned to use it as a scare tactic.
March 5, 2020	Weston, Florida	0	1	1	A school security officer was with a school maintenance worker in the parking lot of Sagemount School when he unintentionally shot the worker in the eye. The officer was not authorized to carry the weapon on campus.
March 11, 2020	Shenango Township, Pennsylvania	0	2	2	Byron Benetas shot at a school van carrying seven elementary school students. Two bullets hit the van. Nobody was hit, although two children were injured by flying glass. Benetas was arrested a short time after and later pleaded guilty to aggravated assault and reckless endangerment in exchange for other charges, including attempted murder, being dropped. He was sentenced to three to six years imprisonment and two years' probation.
March 15, 2020	Humble, Texas	1	0	1	A large group of men jumped a fence to gain access to Atascocita High School's football field, when an argument escalated, and a 19-year-old was killed. The shooter, Jaqwaun Glenn Pradia, was sentenced to 50 years in prison with 25 years before parole.
March 30, 2020	Madison, Wisconsin	2	0	2	18-year-old Khari Sanford abducted his girlfriend's parents from their home and brought them to the University of Wisconsin–Madison Arboretum, where he shot both of them in the head. Sanford, who was previously staying with the victims, had reportedly gotten into a dispute with them over COVID-19 social distancing restrictions.
May 5, 2020	Visalia, California	3	0	3	
July 27, 2020	Oro Valley, Arizona	1	0	1	A worker fixing the roof of Canyon del Oro High School was fatally wounded after his unholstered weapon accidentally discharged.
July 29, 2020	Collinsville, Illinois	0	1	1	Responding officers to a report of a student in distress at Collinsville High School opened fire after a 17-year-old pointed a weapon at them, wounding the teenager.
September 16, 2020	Sonora, California	1	0	1	At Sonora High School in downtown Sonora, a student named Eric Aguiar, 17, was shot and killed in the High School's parking lot. The shooter, Joshua Amondo Rodriguez was found guilty of first-degree murder and three counts of attempted second-degree murder and sentenced to 71 years, eight months plus 50 years to life in prison, with eligibility for parole in 20 years.
September 16, 2020	Macomb, Illinois	0	1	1	Kavion Poplous, 18, was arrested and charged with attempted first-degree murder, aggravated battery, and aggravated discharge of a firearm in the shooting of a student in a dorm at Western Illinois University. Poplous was sentenced to 18 years in prison plus three years of supervised release.
September 19, 2020	San Francisco, California	0	0	0	At Krouzian-Zekarian-Vasbouragan Armenian School, a 1-2 am shooting happened, which was believed to be a hate crime targeting the Armenian people. Nobody was killed or injured in the shooting.
November 25, 2020	Garden City, Kansas	1	1	2	A man was arrested after a 4-year-old girl was shot and killed at a house, and a 16-year-old was injured nearby in the Abe Hubert Elementary School parking lot.
December 17, 2020	Birmingham, Alabama	1	0	1	A 20-year-old University of Alabama at Birmingham student was shot and killed in a campus parking lot outside the student center. Investigators believed the shooting occurred during an arranged meeting to sell headphones. The shooter Carlos Stephens was originally convicted of capital murder in her death and sentenced to life without parole but had his conviction vacated and later pled guilty to a lesser charge and was sentenced to 25 years in prison.

== 2021 ==
37 incidents.

Date	Location	Deaths	Injuries	Total	Description
February 26, 2021	New Orleans, Louisiana	1	0	1	A Tulane University police officer was shot and killed after trying to break up a fight at a high school basketball game at George Washington Carver High School.
March 1, 2021	Pine Bluff, Arkansas	1	0	1	A 15-year-old student was killed in a targeted shooting at Watson Chapel Junior High School. The shooter pled guilty to first degree murder and was sentenced to 40 years in prison.
March 8, 2021	Chesterfield, South Carolina	0	1	1	A woman wounded her son-in-law in the parking lot of Edwards Elementary School while school was in session, before fleeing the area.
April 12, 2021	Knoxville, Tennessee	1 (Note: Including the suspect or perpetrator)	1	2	A student armed with a handgun was shot and killed after a confrontation with a police officer at Austin-East High School. One officer was shot but survived.
April 26, 2021	Plymouth, Minnesota	0	0	0	An unidentified 6th-grade student fired several shots from a handgun into the ceiling in a hallway within Plymouth Middle School. He was taken into custody by police without incident. There were no reported casualties.
April 27, 2021	Smyrna, Delaware	1	0	1	A man shot and killed his wife in the parking lot of Smyrna Middle School after an argument before picking up their child for a doctor's appointment. Police later determined that he had killed a female friend of his wife. The man was killed in a car crash while attempting to flee from police.
May 6, 2021	Rigby, Idaho	0	3	3	Two students and one custodian were shot and wounded by a 6th-grade female student who opened fire inside Rigby Middle School in the morning hours of May 6, 2021. The perpetrator was disarmed by a teacher and taken into custody by police.
June 8, 2021	Kansas City, Kansas	1	0	1	A 15-year-old boy was walking in front of Hazel Grove Elementary school when a vehicle stopped next to him. The shooter called out to the victim and then fatally shot him.
July 9, 2021	Wichita, Kansas	1	0	1	Following a police chase, a man driving a vehicle crashed into a field in front of Campus High School. He then fired shots at officers from the vehicle, after which the vehicle caught fire, and he died inside it.
August 13, 2021	Albuquerque, New Mexico	1	0	1	A 13-year-old student allegedly shot and killed another 13-year-old student, Bennie Hargrove, during a lunch hour at Washington Middle School.
August 18, 2021	Orangeburg, South Carolina	0	3	3	A 14-year-old student allegedly opened fire in the parking lot of Orangeburg-Wilkinson High School while students were leaving for the day, wounding three.
August 27, 2021	Woodridge, Virginia	0	2	2	A teenager wounded two people in the parking lot of Freedom High School after two groups got into a fight following a football game.
August 27, 2021	Sharon Hill, Pennsylvania	1	4	5	A teenager and a 21-year-old man got into a shootout following a football game at Academy Park High School. Three police officers fired at a vehicle they incorrectly believed was involved in the shooting, striking 8-year-old bystander Fanta Bility, who died. Officers Brian Devaney, Sean Dolan and Devon Smith later pleaded guilty to reckless endangerment and were sentenced to five years of probation.
August 27, 2021	Wilmington, North Carolina	0	1	1	A student was shot during a fight at New Hanover High School. Another student, Chance Debalo was charged with attempted murder. Deablo plead guilty to intent to kill with a deadly weapon, resulting in injury, and discharging a firearm on school grounds and he was sentenced to over four years in prison.
September 1, 2021	Winston-Salem, North Carolina	1	0	1	A student was shot and killed at Mount Tabor High School. Suspect, another student at the school, has been taken into custody.
September 4, 2021	Towson, Maryland	0	3	3	Three people, including one student, were shot on the campus of Towson University during a gathering at 2 am. Neither the university nor any student organization organized the gathering.
September 7, 2021	Buena Park, California	1	0	1	Cedric Baxter drove his SUV into a school bus driven by his estranged wife, then opened fire on it. A six-year-old child was also on the bus, though the gunfire injured neither the child nor the driver. Baxter then drove away from the scene, resulting in a high-speed chase which ended when Baxter's car crashed. The police subsequently killed Baxter in a shootout.
September 9, 2021	Royal Oak Township, Michigan	0	0	0	At the Tri-County Education Center, two groups of teenagers got into a fight when one of the teens went home, obtained a firearm, and then fired a shot into the ground in the school parking lot.
September 20, 2021	Newport News, Virginia	0	4	4	Two people were wounded after a shooting at Heritage High School. Another two students were hospitalized for non-shooting injuries.
September 21, 2021	Wichita, Kansas	0	3	3	Two students were shot and a third grazed outside Wichita East High School.
September 24, 2021	Fairfield, Alabama	0	1	1	A man was wounded during a football game at Fairfield High Preparatory School while tailgating in the parking lot. The gunfire seemed to come from off the school campus.
September 30, 2021	Memphis, Tennessee	0	1	1	One student was shot in Cummings Elementary School.
September 30, 2021	Newton, Mississippi	0	1	1	A 7-year-old student was injured after a gun accidentally discharged from the backpack of another student at Newton Elementary School.
October 1, 2021	Houston, Texas	0	1	1	A former student walked into the YES Prep Southwest school and opened fire, wounding the principal as he attempted to lock down the school.
October 6, 2021	Arlington, Texas	0	4	4	An adult shooter opened fire in Mansfield Timberview High School after a fight escalated; four people were injured, including a 15-year-old and a teacher.
October 12, 2021	Chicago, Illinois	0	2	2	Someone across the street from Wendell Phillips Academy High School in Bronzeville opened fire during dismissal, wounding a student and a security guard.
October 13, 2021	Grambling, Louisiana	1	1	2	An eighteen-year-old opened fire at Grambling State University killed a 19-year-old and wounded a 16-year-old before fleeing campus.
October 17, 2021	Grambling, Louisiana	1	7	8	A gunman opened fire at Grambling State University in the early morning outside a dining hall where students were celebrating homecoming. One person was killed, and seven were wounded.
October 19, 2021	Indianapolis, Indiana	1	0	1	A man was shot and killed outside a building on the University of Indianapolis campus.
November 1, 2021	Madison, Mississippi	0	0	0	A woman accidentally fired her gun while reaching for her phone during a basketball game at the Rosa Scott School. No one was injured.
November 19, 2021	Aurora, Colorado	0	3	3	Three students were shot in the parking lot of Hinkley High School. No fatalities were reported.
November 26, 2021	Campbell, California	0	2	2	Two men were wounded in the parking lot of Westmont High School during a football game.
November 29, 2021	Phoenix, Arizona	0	1	1	A student wounded another in a bathroom of Cesar Chavez High School after a gun sale gone bad. The wounded individual realized that the money he received in the sale was fake and was shot in the argument.
November 30, 2021	Oxford Township, Michigan	4	7	11	2021 Oxford High School shooting: A 15-year-old sophomore was taken into custody and later convicted. Seven people, including a teacher, were injured, and four died, all of whom were students.
November 30, 2021	Humboldt, Tennessee	1	2	3	A man was killed, and two others were wounded two hours into a pair of basketball games between Humboldt High School and North Side. The shooting occurred outside the gym near the concessions.
December 6, 2021	Wilmington, California	1	2	3	A 12-year-old was killed, and his step-mother was wounded when a teenager opened fire on their vehicle outside the Wilmington Park Elementary School. A 9-year-old in the playground was also injured.
December 8, 2021	Kansas City, Missouri	0	2	2	Two teenagers were wounded in the parking lot of Ewing Marion Kauffman School during a basketball game.

== 2022 ==
55 incidents.

Date	Location	Deaths	Injuries	Total	Description
January 4, 2022	Rockford, Illinois	0	2	2	Two 17-year-olds were wounded while sitting in a car in the parking lot of Auburn High School around 1 pm. Three juveniles fled and were later arrested.
January 9, 2022	Murfreesboro, North Carolina	0	0	0	An unknown individual discharged a gun in a Chowan University dorm room, no injuries were reported, and the bullet was later located in a fridge.
January 11, 2022	Albuquerque, New Mexico	0	0	0	A shooting occurred in the parking lot of Valley High School during a basketball game; no injuries were reported.
January 19, 2022	Sanford, Florida	0	1	1	A 16-year-old student wounded an 18-year-old student around noon at Seminole High School over a disagreement about a dead relative.
January 19, 2022	Pittsburgh, Pennsylvania	1	0	1	A 15-year-old boy boarded a school van to go home when school was being dismissed at Oliver Citywide Academy. Two masked gunmen approached the van and shot the boy twice in the chest. The boy was taken to the hospital, where he later died. The shooter, Eugene Watson, and his younger brother were not arrested until April 2023. Eugene pled guilty to third-degree murder, conspiracy, and firearms violations. He was sentenced to 20 to 40 years in prison, while the younger brother was adjudicated delinquent in juvenile court on one conspiracy count.
January 21, 2022	Derwood, Maryland	0	1	1	A 17-year-old boy shot and wounded a 15-year-old boy in a bathroom at Colonel Zadok Magruder High School. The victim was hospitalized, and the shooter was taken into custody.
January 29, 2022	Beloit, Wisconsin	1	0	1	A 19-year-old man (suspected to be Amaree Goodall) shot and killed another 19-year-old man, Jion Broomfield in the parking lot of Beloit Memorial High School. The victim was admitted to a nearby hospital around 9:07 P.M. CST with a gunshot wound to his leg and died shortly after. Goodall, a native of Madison, was not captured until March 30.
February 1, 2022	Richfield, Minnesota	1	1	2	At the South Education Center, a fight broke out, which resulted in 15-year-old student Jahmari Rice being killed and a 17-year-old student critically injured.
February 1, 2022	Bridgewater, Virginia	2	1	3	Two campus police and security officers were shot and killed at Bridgewater College. The shooter was taken into custody and hospitalized for non-life-threatening injuries.
February 6, 2022	Morgantown, West Virginia	0	0	0	A member of the Phi Sigma Phi fraternity fired a gun into the air following a fight with Delta Chi members at West Virginia University.
February 8, 2022	Catonsville, Maryland	0	1	1	A 16-year-old was wounded in an apparent targeted shooting in Catonsville High Schools parking lot shortly after 3pm.
February 9, 2022	Minneapolis, Minnesota	0	1	1	A moving school bus was fired at, which resulted in the bus driver being non-fatally shot in the head.
March 4, 2022	Olathe, Kansas	0	3	3	An 18-year-old senior at Olathe East High School, identified as Jaylon Elmore, was called to the office on suspicion of carrying a gun. Upon arriving, an assistant principal demanded that he be allowed to search the student's backpack. When the student refused, a School Resource Officer (SRO) was called. After the SRO arrived, four bullets were fired from each of two guns, one by the SRO and another by the student. The SRO, the assistant principal, and the student were all injured. However, the Kansas City Defender has raised numerous questions about the official narrative, including whether the student or the SRO shot first. They also claim that there likely would not have been a shooting at all if the student had not been challenged about carrying a weapon in his backpack. Elmore was sentenced to 20 years in prison in March 2025.
March 7, 2022	Des Moines, Iowa	1	2	3	2022 East High School shooting: Around 2:42 P.M. CST, shooters from multiple vehicles opened fire on a group of teenagers in front of East High School in a drive-by shooting. 3 teenagers, a 15-year-old targeted male, a 16-year-old female, and an 18-year-old female, were shot and transferred to hospitals where they were reported to be in critical condition. The targeted victim died from his injuries shortly thereafter. 6 teenagers were arrested in the following hours and were later charged as adults for murder.
March 31, 2022	Greenville, South Carolina	1	0	1	A 12-year-old student shot and killed another student at Tanglewood Middle School. The shooter was found under a deck at a nearby home.
April 2, 2022	Santa Rosa, California	1	0	1	Near Hilliard Comstock Middle School, a 19-year-old man, Connor Bundock, was shot dead as he was hanging out with his friends at a park at late-night hours. The shooting allegedly was over a robbery, and the victim intervened and attempted to defend his friend from being robbed; a suspect was allegedly charged and sentenced to 21 years for the killing.
April 5, 2022	Erie, Pennsylvania	0	1	1	A student was wounded after multiple shots were fired at Erie High School around 9:20 am. No perpetrator was immediately identified, and police were searching for a person who had fled campus shortly after the shooting.
April 8, 2022	Bronx, New York City, New York	1	2	3	A shooting around the school property of University Prep High School in the Bronx killed a 17-year-old girl and wounded two others in a school stairway; the victim was not the intended target, according to investigators. A 17-year-old boy was arrested.
April 14, 2022	Lake Ariel, Pennsylvania	0	0	0	A 13-year-old was arrested and charged with institutional vandalism and possession of a weapon on school property after being seen firing a gun just above a door at the main entrance of Western Wayne Middle School by surveillance footage.
April 22, 2022	Washington, D.C.	1	4	5	A resident of an adjacent apartment building fired more than 239 shots indiscriminately toward the Edmund Burke School in the Van Ness neighborhood of Washington, D.C., wounding a 12-year-old, two adults in their vehicles, and a school security guard. The shooting took place across the street from the student center of the University of the District of Columbia. Multiple law enforcement agencies led an intensive area lockdown for more than five hours that ended after the 23-year-old suspect died from a self-inflicted gunshot wound as police breached the apartment door.
May 9, 2022	Suwanee, Georgia	0	1	1	A woman fired 12 shots at a moving school bus. Nobody was shot, but the bus driver was injured by shattered glass.
May 17, 2022	Chicago, Illinois	0	1	1	An 8-year-old child found his mother's gun under his mother's bed and brought it to his school in his backpack. On Tuesday, May 17, at around 10 AM, the gun accidentally discharged in the student's backpack in the classroom and injured a 7-year-old classmate. The mother, 28-year-old Tatanina Kelly, is charged with three counts of child endangerment. The incident took place at Walt Disney Magnet school in the Buena Park neighborhood located at 4140 N. Marine Drive.
May 18, 2022	Murfreesboro, Tennessee	1	1	2	Following a graduation ceremony for Riverdale High School on the campus of Middle Tennessee State University, a fight began in which two people were shot. A graduate of Riverdale was killed, a student was wounded, and another teenager was arrested.
May 19, 2022	Hammond, Louisiana	0	3	3	Three people were hospitalized after a shooting at Southeastern Louisiana University, where students at Hammond High Magnet School were leaving their graduation ceremony.
May 19, 2022	Kentwood, Michigan	0	2	2	On May 19, 2022, two people (a 16-year-old boy and a 40-year-old woman) were shot outside East Kentwood High School's football stadium during a graduation ceremony. According to the Kent County Sheriff, the shooting started thirty minutes after the ceremony ended when families were leaving, at that time, a white Hyundai drove by; an individual inside the car opened fire upon the families, they ended up hitting bystanders instead of their alleged target. Another group (the alleged targets) returned fire on the car, and were later arrested and charged with weapons violations; police believe there may have been as many as 5 total accomplices.
May 24, 2022	Uvalde, Texas	22	18	40	Robb Elementary School shooting: An 18-year-old gunman entered his former elementary school and opened fire, killing 21 people, consisting of 19 students and 2 teachers, and wounding 17 others. Earlier that day, he had shot his grandmother at her home, severely wounding her. It is the third-deadliest school shooting in U.S. History. The gunman was killed in a shootout with responding police officers.
May 31, 2022	New Orleans, Louisiana	1	2 (Note: Including two of the perpetrators)	3	Three people, including two of the shooters, were shot after a graduation ceremony for Morris Jeff Community School on the campus of Xavier University of Louisiana. One of the victims, an older woman, died from her injuries.
June 1, 2022	Los Angeles, California	0	1	1	Both Los Angeles School police and officers from the Los Angeles Police Department responded to the scene, and believe the incident might have been gang-related. According to police, a male student at Ulysses S. Grant High School was shot in the leg, in the area of Oxnard St. and Coldwater Canyon, in front of the school, and was transported to Cedars Sinai Hospital in stable condition.
June 8, 2022	Little Rock, Arkansas	0	0	0	A school bus that was taking a student home from a summer program was hit by a bullet. No one was injured in the incident.
June 9, 2022	Byhalia, Mississippi	0	0	0	A minor was arrested after firing a gun at Byhalia High School.
August 3, 2022	Oakland, California	0	3	3	At Oakland Tech High School, three people were shot, including a 6-year-old girl.
August 19, 2022	Clarksville, Tennessee	0	0	0	A teenager fired multiple gunshots during a football game at West Creek High School. Three people were arrested in connection with the incident.
August 19, 2022	Groveport, Ohio	0	0	0	A man fired six shots during a fight at a football game at Groveport Madison High School. No injuries were reported.
August 25, 2022	Bismarck, North Dakota	0	0	0	A man fired multiple gunshots on the campus of United Tribes Technical College. Two people, brothers, were charged in connection with the shooting.
August 29, 2022	Oakland, California	0	1	1	At Madison Park Academy, police responded to a report about a shooting; a 13-year-old boy was shot, and a 12-year-old boy fled after the shooting but was quickly arrested and charged with assault with a firearm and other weapons charges. Police say the victim was not the intended target.
September 3, 2022	Dover, Delaware	0	4	4	A non-student shot four people near basketball courts on the Delaware State University campus, including two students.
September 20, 2022	South Bend, Indiana	0	0	0	A juvenile suspect was detained after a shot was fired on board a Jackson Middle School school bus.
September 24, 2022	Richfield, Minnesota	0	2	2	Two people were shot following a fight near a Richfield High School football game. Two juveniles were arrested in connection with the shooting.
September 27, 2022	Philadelphia, Pennsylvania	1	4	5	Following a football scrimmage at Roxborough High School, two shooters fired at a group of football players from a car, killing a 14-year-old boy and wounding four others.
September 28, 2022	Oakland, California	1	5	6	2022 Oakland school shooting: Six adults were wounded in a shooting at a Rudsdale Newcomer High School, in a block of East Oakland that houses four schools. One victim died of his injuries in November 2022.
September 30, 2022	Newburgh, New York	0	3	3	Three people were shot in the parking lot of Newburgh Free Academy following a football game.
September 30, 2022	Tulsa, Oklahoma	1	3	4	Four people were shot, one fatally, near the tennis courts of McLain High School during a homecoming game.
October 5, 2022	Tucson, Arizona	1	0	1	Professor Thomas Meixner, the department head of Hydrology and Atmospheric Sciences at the University of Arizona, was shot and killed on campus. A former student was arrested in connection with the shooting. He was sentenced to life in prison. The shooter had repeatedly harassed Meixner and other professors, believing Meixner, who he incorrectly thought was Jewish, was orchestrating a conspiracy against him. The threats had led another professor in the department to buy a bulletproof vest and spend less time on campus.
October 7, 2022	Toledo, Ohio	0	3	3	Three people were shot outside a football game at Whitmer High School.
October 8, 2022	Baltimore, Maryland	0	1	1	A man was shot during an unsanctioned party on the Morgan State University campus.
October 24, 2022	St. Louis, Missouri	3	7	10	2022 Central Visual and Performing Arts High School shooting: A 19-year-old man armed with a semi-automatic rifle entered the Central Visual and Performing Arts High School just after 9 am and opened fire. At least two people were killed, and seven others were injured. The shooter was killed in an exchange of gunfire with police.
November 4, 2022	West Hartford, Connecticut	0	1	1	An individual was shot in a parking lot on the University of Saint Joseph campus. The suspected shooter is also accused of causing a car accident and shooting at the driver.
November 8, 2022	Seattle, Washington	1	0	1	A student of Ingraham High School was shot inside the school. Another student was arrested for the shooting.
November 12, 2022	Orlando, Florida	1	2	3	Three people were shot in the parking lot of Jones High School during a football game. A 19-year-old was killed.
November 13, 2022	Charlottesville, Virginia	3	2	5	University of Virginia shooting: A student at the University of Virginia shot several students, killing three. The gunman was a former member of the university's football team, and several of the victims, including all three of the deceased, were current members of the team.
November 17, 2022	Clinton, Indiana	0	1	1	A sheriff's deputy teaching a vocational law enforcement class accidentally discharged his weapon, grazing a student.
November 19, 2022	Albuquerque, New Mexico	1	1	2	A student at the University of New Mexico (UNM) lured visiting New Mexico State University basketball power forward Mike Peake on campus and shot him. Peake then returned fire, killing the UNM student.
November 27, 2022	Tallahassee, Florida	1	4	5	One person was killed and four others were injured when a shooter opened fire in the outdoor basketball court of Florida A&M University.
December 8, 2022	Fuquay-Varina, North Carolina	0	0	0	A 12-year-old student at Fuquay-Varina Middle School fired a gun at a window in a classroom where several students were present. Shortly after, a teacher who heard the shot entered the room and convinced the student to give her the firearm.
December 16, 2022	Chicago, Illinois	2	2	4	Four students were shot, two fatally, as students left Benito Juarez Community Academy. In February 2023, a 16-year-old boy was arrested for the shooting.

== 2023 ==
60 incidents.

Date	Location	Deaths	Injuries	Total	Description
January 4, 2023	Detroit, Michigan	1	0	1	A man was shot to death in front of Trix Academy. At least 20 rounds were fired at him.
January 5, 2023	Rochester, New York	0	0	0	A man got out of a car and approached Franklin High School and fired several shots at three students who were walking into the building. No one was injured.
January 6, 2023	Newport News, Virginia	0	1	1	Shooting of Abby Zwerner: A 6-year-old boy, a student at Richneck Elementary School, shot and wounded teacher Abby Zwerner.
January 7, 2023	Portland, Oregon	0	1	1	A teenager was grazed by a bullet in the parking lot of Franklin High School during a basketball game. A teenager was arrested nearby for possession of an unlawful gun, though they did not say if he was the shooter.
January 10, 2023	Stanford, Kentucky	0	1	1	A maintenance worker at Stanford Elementary School accidentally shot himself while working at around 11 p.m. The worker did not notify anyone of the shooting, which was discovered the next day after a trail of blood was found in a staff break room. He was charged with unlawful possession of a weapon on school property.
January 20, 2023	Saint Paul, Minnesota	0	1	1	A man got into a fight outside the Washington Technology Magnet School as he picked up his sister, which ended with the man firing three gunshots. One bullet grazed a nearby staff member. The man, a member of a Karen American gang, later admitted involvement in three other shootings.
January 23, 2023	Des Moines, Iowa	2	1	3	Two students were killed, and the program director was wounded after a shooting at a charter school. Multiple suspects were arrested in connection with the shooting.
February 6, 2023	Middletown, Delaware	0	0	0	A gun was fired during a fight near a basketball game at Appoquinimink High School. No injuries were reported.
February 13, 2023	East Lansing, Michigan	4	5	9	2023 Michigan State University shooting: A man shot several people on the Michigan State University campus, killing three and wounding five before killing himself after being confronted by police. The man was not associated with the university.
February 13, 2023	New York City, New York	0	0	0	Bullets struck two windows of classrooms at PS 78 in the Stapleton neighborhood of Staten Island. Ten adults occupied one classroom, but no bullets entered the classrooms.
February 14, 2023	Pittsburgh, Pennsylvania	0	4	4	Four students were shot outside Westinghouse Academy as students were dismissed for the day.
February 24, 2023	Daytona Beach, Florida	0	0	0	A man fired a shot inside a room at Bethune–Cookman University. The suspected shooter attempted to leave but was apprehended after falling down some stairs. Police found a wall in the suspect's room that had multiple bullet holes over a period of time.
March 3, 2023	Orangeburg, South Carolina	0	1	1	A student at South Carolina State University was shot on campus.
March 11, 2023	Waterville, Maine	0	1	1	During a party on the Colby College campus, an altercation broke out, and a man not affiliated with the college fired two rounds into a hallway wall. No one was hit by gunfire, though the suspected shooter was treated for head injuries sustained during the fight.
March 20, 2023	Arlington, Texas	1	1	2	In the parking lot of Arlington Lamar High School, two students were shot, one fatally, and a teen who was not a student was arrested for the shooting.
March 22, 2023	Dallas, Texas	0	1	1	As classes let out for the day, a student was injured at the parking lot of Thomas Jefferson High School in a drive-by shooting.
March 22, 2023	Denver, Colorado	1	2	3	17-year-old Austin Lyle, a student at East High School, was required to be pat down by administrators at the start of each day as part of a safety plan. During one pat-down, Lyle pulled out a gun and shot and wounded two administrators. Lyle fled and was later found dead near Bailey, having shot himself.
March 25, 2023	Orangeburg, South Carolina	0	0	0	South Carolina State University was placed on lockdown after reports of shots being fired.
March 27, 2023	Nashville, Tennessee	7	1	8	2023 Covenant School shooting: A shooting occurred at Covenant School in the Green Hills neighborhood. Six people were killed, consisting of three students and three staff members, and a police officer was injured by shattered glass. The shooter was killed by two responding Metropolitan Nashville Police Department officers.
March 30, 2023	Winston-Salem, North Carolina	0	1	1	Shots were fired on the Forsyth Technical Community College campus. One person was injured.
April 10, 2023	Louisville, Kentucky	1	1	2	Two people were shot outside a building on the Jefferson Community and Technical College campus. The shooting occurred on the same day as a separate shooting in Louisville, though the two were unrelated.
April 15, 2023	Chester County, Pennsylvania	0	2	2	Two non-students were shot during a "Yardfest" celebration on the Lincoln University campus.
April 24, 2023	Midwest City, Oklahoma	1	0	1	A man shot and killed another man at Rose State College.
April 27, 2023	Richmond, Virginia	0	2	2	Two students at George Wythe High School were shot in a school parking lot.
April 28, 2023	Knoxville, Tennessee	0	1	1	A teacher at West High School was grazed by a bullet after a gun was fired while a student was reaching into his backpack. The 14-year-old student was taken into custody.
April 29, 2023	Tallahassee, Florida	0	1	1	A man fired several shots following a fight outside a dormitory at Florida State University, hitting one person.
May 1, 2023	Flint, Michigan	0	1	1	A woman waiting to pick her child up outside the International Academy of Flint was shot after an argument. Another mother was arrested for the shooting.
May 12, 2023	Chadron, Nebraska	0	0	0	A man fired several shots on the Chadron State College campus.
May 12, 2023	Lenoir City, Tennessee	1	0	1	A man carrying a gun on school property accidentally shot himself while leaving a graduation ceremony at Lenoir City High School.
May 24, 2023	Pittsburgh, Pennsylvania	1	0	1	Jaymier Perry 15-year-old student shot and killed another student 15-year-old Derrick Henry outside of Oliver Citywide Academy before class. Perry pled guilty to the charges in June 2026.
June 2, 2023	Worcester, Massachusetts	0	1	1	A man was shot on Worcester Technical High School property.
June 6, 2023	Richmond, Virginia	2	5	7	2023 Richmond shooting: Seven people were shot, two fatally, after a high school graduation ceremony was held on the campus of Virginia Commonwealth University.
July 5, 2023	Washington, D.C.	1	0	1	A Kentucky schoolteacher was shot and killed during a robbery on the Catholic University of America campus.
July 13, 2023	Washington, D.C.	1	0	1	A construction worker was shot and killed during a robbery on the Howard University campus.
August 16, 2023	Augusta, Georgia	0	1	1	A student shot another student following a fight at T. W. Josey High School.
August 18, 2023	Columbus, Georgia	2	0	2	A Columbus State University student shot and killed another student before killing himself.
August 22, 2023	Seguin, Texas	0	0	0	A student at Jefferson Elementary School accidentally fired a gun on a school bus as it pulled into the parking lot.
August 22, 2023	Huntsville, Alabama	0	2	2	Two people were shot during a fight outside an Alabama A&M University residence hall.
August 25, 2023	Choctaw, Oklahoma	1	4	5	A 16-year-old Midwest City High School student was killed, two people were nonfatally shot, and two other students sustained broken bones while fleeing after a fight at a Choctaw High School football game against Del City High School.
August 25, 2023	Greensboro, North Carolina	0	1	1	A non-student was shot on the campus of North Carolina Agricultural and Technical State University.
August 28, 2023	Chapel Hill, North Carolina	1	0	1	Shooting of Zijie Yan: A graduate student shot and killed Zijie Yan, a University of North Carolina at Chapel Hill faculty member.
September 5, 2023	Oakland, California	0	0	0	At Skyline High School, shots were fired near the theater area; no one was injured.
September 9, 2023	Little Rock, Arkansas	1	0	1	A student at the University of Arkansas at Little Rock was shot and killed at his on-campus apartment. One suspect was arrested for the shooting, and another is at large.
September 12, 2023	Greensburg, Louisiana	1	2	3	Three people were shot at the St. Helena College & Career Academy. A 16-year-old boy was killed, and three more people were injured. The suspect was 16 years old at the time.
September 15, 2023	Country Club Hills, Illinois	1	0	1	A 14-year-old boy was fatally shot following a homecoming football game at Hillcrest High School in Country Club Hills, Illinois.
September 24, 2023	Tuskegee, Alabama	0	2	2	Two people were shot during a party at a Tuskegee University housing complex.
September 29, 2023	Wasilla, Alaska	0	0	0	A man accidentally dropped a rifle, which caused it to fire a shot into a school bus.
October 3, 2023	Baltimore, Maryland	0	5	5	Five people, including four students, were shot near Morgan State University shortly after the conclusion of homecoming week.
October 12, 2023	Framingham, Massachusetts	0	0	0	A gunshot was fired into the side of a Framingham State University residence hall. The shooting is believed to be connected to a physical altercation that occurred around the same time as the shooting.
October 15, 2023	Kirkwood, Missouri	0	0	0	A man being disruptive at a Trunk-or-Treat event at Kirkwood North Middle School fired several shots into the air before being tackled and detained by other eventgoers.
October 15, 2023	Jackson, Mississippi	1	0	1	A Jackson State University student was shot and killed on campus.
October 17, 2023	Stanford, California	0	1	1	A 47-year-old female was shot and injured by Robert Daniels, 43 at Stanford University Arboretum.
October 23, 2023	Germantown, Wisconsin	1	0	1	Police responded to reports of a suspicious man near Kennedy Middle School. When officers arrived, the man climbed onto the school's roof and fired at police. Following a shootout, police shot and killed the gunman. Approximately 70 students were in the school at the time, which was placed on lockdown.
October 28, 2023	Worcester, Massachusetts	1	1	2	Two people were shot, one fatally, following a fight on the Worcester State University campus.
November 3, 2023	Las Vegas, Nevada	0	2	2	A 16-year-old male and an adult got in a fight on a city bus, then the 16-year-old shot the adult and ran to Foundations Preschool, where he jumped the wall and dropped the gun on the daycare property, then left the school. After the teen left, a 2-year-old girl at the school found the gun and accidentally discharged it, critically injuring herself.
November 13, 2023	Victoria, Texas	0	1	1	A Victoria College student was shot in a campus parking lot.
November 13, 2023	Prairie View, Texas	1	0	1	An employee at Prairie View A&M University's farm research center was shot and killed on campus. The suspected gunman, a former coworker of the victim, fled the scene but was apprehended later that day.
November 27, 2023	Chicago, Illinois	0	0	0	A woman fired several shots during a fight on the Northwestern University Chicago campus.
November 28, 2023	Newport News, Virginia	0	0	0	A man fired several shots near the Christopher Newport University student union. No injuries were reported.
December 6, 2023	Las Vegas, Nevada	4	3	7	2023 University of Nevada, Las Vegas shooting: A man shot and killed three faculty members at the University of Nevada, Las Vegas before being killed by police as he exited a building. The gunman was a professor who had been turned down for a job at the university.

== 2024 ==
63 incidents.

Date	Location	Deaths	Injuries	Total	Description
January 4, 2024	Perry, Iowa	3	6	9	Perry High School shooting: One student was killed, and four other students and three staff members were injured. The principal later died of his injuries. The shooter, a 17-year-old student at the school, committed suicide.
January 17, 2024	Gary, Indiana	0	0	0	A student at Lighthouse College Prep Academy fired a gunshot inside a boys' bathroom.
January 29, 2024	Austin, Texas	0	1	1	A 17-year-old John B. Connally High School student allegedly shot and ran over another student in the school's parking lot.
January 30, 2024	Mobile, Alabama	0	2	2	Two students were shot at LeFlore Magnet High School following an argument.
February 6, 2024	Orangeburg, South Carolina	0	1	1	A student at South Carolina State University (SCSU) allegedly fired a gunshot in an academic building. No one was struck by gunfire, but one student suffered minor injuries from broken glass. That student fled from SCSU to a dining hall at nearby Claflin University, with both it and SCSU being placed on lockdown for about an hour.
February 9, 2024	Saco, Maine	0	0	0	Shots were fired outside Thornton Academy, coming from two separate cars that were shooting at each other. It was unclear if they were students or had any connection to the school. No injuries are reported, and the suspects immediately fled. A school bus was also careened by one of the two evading cars, with no reported injuries as of Feb. 10.
February 9, 2024	Berkeley, California	0	0	0	A person fired several shots into the air after an altercation on the University of California, Berkeley campus.
February 10, 2024	Bangor, Maine	0	1	1	A homeless man shot another homeless man on the University of Maine at Augusta campus in Bangor. A suspect was arrested a year later and claimed self-defense.
February 14, 2024	Atlanta, Georgia	0	4	4	Four students at Benjamin E. Mays High School were shot in a parking lot.
February 16, 2024	Colorado Springs, Colorado	2	0	2	Two people were shot and killed in a University of Colorado, Colorado Springs dorm room.
February 19, 2024	Mesquite, Texas	0	1	1	A student at Pioneer Technology and Arts Academy was shot and grazed by police officers after flashing a gun at them.
February 25, 2024	Evanston, Illinois	0	0	0	Shots were fired on the Northwestern University campus.
February 26, 2024	Odessa, Texas	0	1	1	A student at Odessa High School was shot in the foot at the school parking lot.
March 11, 2024	Springfield, Massachusetts	0	0	0	A man fired a single shot through a window at the Springfield High School of Science and Technology after being let in by a student.
March 18, 2024	Huntsville, Alabama	0	1	1	A campus police officer and a man exchanged gunfire in an Alabama A&M University building. The gunman was injured, while the police officer was not.
April 2, 2024	Cambridge, Massachusetts	0	0	0	A school resource officer at Cambridge Rindge and Latin School accidentally discharged their firearm in a school bathroom.
April 2, 2024	Durham, North Carolina	0	1	1	A student at North Carolina Central University was shot in a dorm building. Three other students were charged in connection with the shooting.
April 12, 2024	Dallas, Texas	0	1	1	A student at Wilmer-Hutchins High School shot another student in a targeted shooting.
April 15, 2024	Greensboro, North Carolina	0	0	0	A North Carolina A&T University student was arrested for firing a gunshot in a dorm building during an argument with an acquaintance.
April 21, 2024	Dover, Delaware	1	0	1	A woman was shot and killed outside of a dormitory on the Delaware State University campus.
April 22, 2024	West Richland, Washington	1	0	1	A woman was shot and killed outside Wiley Elementary School during dismissal. The shooter, a former police officer and her ex-husband, became a fugitive after allegedly killing a 17-year-old girl and abducting his child with his ex-wife. He was later spotted near Eugene, Oregon where he shot himself as police closed in. The child was physically unharmed.
April 23, 2024	Raleigh, North Carolina	0	0	0	A man in his 70s was arrested for allegedly firing several gunshots following an argument near the International Studies Building at Shaw University.
April 24, 2024	Arlington, Texas	1	0	1	An 18-year-old Bowie High School student was shot and killed on campus. Another student was arrested for the shooting.
April 30, 2024	New York City, New York	0	0	0	An NYPD officer accidentally fired his gun while clearing a hall at Columbia University of protesters occupying the building.
May 1, 2024	Syracuse, New York	0	0	0	A bullet was fired through a dorm window at the State University of New York College of Environmental Science and Forestry.
May 3, 2024	Washington, D.C.	0	1	1	A 17-year-old female student was injured when a bullet fired from outside hit and grazed her in a classroom at Dunbar High School. Two suspects, a 17-year-old and an 18-year-old, were charged with the shooting.
May 18, 2024	Kennesaw, Georgia	1	0	1	A woman was shot and killed outside a residence hall on the Kennesaw State University campus. A non-student was charged with murder.
May 19, 2024	Cape Girardeau, Missouri	0	2	2	Two people were shot during a graduation ceremony for Cape Girardeau Central High School held at the Show Me Center on Southeast Missouri State University's campus.
May 21, 2024	South San Francisco, California	0	0	0	A 38-year-old man allegedly fired gunshots in the vicinity of Westborough Middle School, during 2:25 p.m. on a school day. There were no known targets, and there were no wounded children or victims.
June 6, 2024	Seattle, Washington	1	0	1	A 17-year-old Garfield High School student was shot and killed outside the campus while trying to break up an altercation between a suspected shooter and another person.
August 10, 2024	Nashville, Tennessee	0	2	2	Two people were injured in a shooting near a dorm building at Vanderbilt University. The shooting was sparked by a dispute over employment between construction workers.
August 14, 2024	Ettrick, Virginia	0	4	4	Four people were injured and two arrested after a shooting on the Virginia State University campus. None of the injured were students at the university.
August 18, 2024	Itta Bena, Mississippi	0	2	2	Two people were shot in the parking lot of the Mississippi Valley State University student union.
August 26, 2024	Houston, Texas	2	0	2	A man shot his girlfriend, a student at Rice University, before killing himself.
August 30, 2024	Huntsville, Alabama	0	1	1	A student at the University of Alabama in Huntsville accidentally shot themselves in a car on campus.
August 21, 2024	San Francisco, California	0	1	1	During a physical altercation involving two people occurring nearby Galileo Academy of Science and Technology, a student, 16, was shot in the shoulder and wounded adjacent to the school's athletic field area and in front of a liquor store. It happened around 12:35 p.m. on a school day by a liquor store, and one shot was believed by authorities to have been fired. The suspect was arrested in Oct. 2024 and charged with Attempted Murder. According to the victim's relatives, he was reportedly pressured to join the suspect's gang and refused.
September 3, 2024	Huntsville, Alabama	0	1	1	Three students at Alabama A&M University attacked another student inside a living complex, with one beating the victim with a gun. At one point, the gun went off, but no one was struck by gunfire.
September 4, 2024	Winder, Georgia	4	9 (Note: 7 by gunfire)	13	2024 Apalachee High School shooting: Georgia State Patrol responded to a school shooting at the Apalachee High School near Winder, Georgia. Two teachers and two students were killed, while nine others were injured. A suspect, 14-year-old Colt Gray, was taken into custody.
September 4, 2024	New York City, New York	0	1	1	A gunshot, suspected by police to come from an adjacent apartment complex, hit a teacher at MS 391 in her hand while she was in a sixth-floor classroom; it happened one day before the scheduled start of the school year.
September 6, 2024	Joppatowne, Maryland	1	0	1	A student at Joppatowne High School was shot and killed in a bathroom. Another student who was arrested for the shooting was sentenced to life in prison with parole.
September 10, 2024	Omaha, Nebraska	0	1	1	A 15-year-old was shot inside Omaha Northwest High School.
September 19, 2024	Atlanta, Georgia	0	0	0	A catering employee at Emory University fired a shot at a colleague and pointed his gun at another coworker. He fled the scene but was later arrested.
September 22, 2024	Tucson, Arizona	1	0	1	A Pima Community College student was shot and killed at a volleyball court on the University of Arizona campus.
October 5, 2024	Colorado Springs, Colorado	1	0	1	A man was shot and killed on the Atlas Preparatory School campus during a youth football game.
October 5, 2024	Montgomery, Alabama	0	0	0	Multiple reports of gunfire were reported at Alabama State University during Homecoming festivities. No injuries were reported.
October 10, 2024	Coatesville, Pennsylvania	0	0	0	A Coatesville Area School District school bus carrying high school students was shot at while moving. Bullets hit nobody; however, the windshield was hit, which sent glass into the face of the bus driver. One male Coatesville High School student was arrested, and three more suspects are being sought.
October 14, 2024	Santa Monica, California	2	0	2	An employee was shot at Santa Monica College's Media and Design campus, dying of her injuries two days later. The next day, the shooter, surrounded by police after a chase, committed suicide in his vehicle.
October 17, 2024	Louisville, Kentucky	0	1	1	A student at Atherton High School accidentally shot himself in the leg in a parking lot.
October 3, 2024	Oceanside, California	0	1	1	A 19-year-old male was shot and wounded at Cesar Chavez High School on a school day at 6:30 p.m., after school hours but during school activities. No suspect was immediately detained.
October 19, 2024	Albany, Georgia	1	5	6	Six people were shot during a homecoming celebration at Albany State University.
October 26, 2024	Durham, North Carolina	0	0	0	During Homecoming celebrations, several shots were fired in the air in a North Carolina Central University parking lot. An assistant professor was arrested. A witness said he was being attacked by a group of men when the professor fired the gun to get them to disperse.
October 26, 2024	Durham, North Carolina	0	4	4	While police swept the campus, a second, unrelated shooting occurred, injuring four people near the student services building. No arrests were made for this shooting.
October 29, 2024	Bridgeport, Connecticut	0	1	1	A man shot another man at a University of Bridgeport dining hall. Neither the suspected shooter nor the victim was affiliated with the university.
October 31, 2024	Painesville Township, Ohio	0	0	0	An off-duty Cleveland Police officer was arrested for allegedly firing a handgun in the Riverview Elementary School parking lot in a domestic incident.
November 6, 2024	Wilmington, Delaware	0	0	0	A constable accidentally fired his weapon in a Stanton Middle School hallway.
November 7, 2024	Salt Lake City, Utah	0	1	1	A group of teens allegedly gathered in the parking lot of West High School, many of whom appeared to know one another and were reportedly involved in a conflict. At some point, a gun was fired and struck the 15-year-old. After that, everyone fled the parking lot. The teen victim was hospitalized with serious but non-life-threatening injuries, and 13 days later, a suspect, a teenage male, was arrested.
November 8, 2024	Philadelphia, Pennsylvania	0	1	1	A woman was shot in the knee during a road rage shooting on the Temple University campus.
November 10, 2024	Country Club Hills, Illinois	1	0	1	A man was fatally shot in front of his son by multiple gunmen while leaving a middle school basketball tournament at Hillcrest High School in Country Club Hills, Illinois.
November 10, 2024	Tuskegee, Alabama	1	16	17	Tuskegee University shooting: One person was killed and 16 others were injured after a shooting during a homecoming event on the Tuskegee University campus.
December 4, 2024	Palermo, California	1	2	3	Feather River School shooting: In a religiously motivated attack, a gunman attacked the Feather River School of the Seventh-Day Adventists, killing himself and injuring two kindergarten students. Both students were taken to the hospital in critical condition.
December 14, 2024	Valdosta, Georgia	0	0	0	A gunshot was fired in a Valdosta State University dorm building.
December 16, 2024	Madison, Wisconsin	3	6	10	Abundant Life Christian School shooting: One teacher and two students (including the shooter) were killed, and six others were injured after a shooting at Abundant Life Christian School.
December 17, 2024	Pittsburgh, Pennsylvania	0	0	0	Shots were fired outside of the Perry Traditional Academy. The 17-year-old suspect was arrested.

== 2025 ==
71 incidents.

Date	Location	Deaths	Injuries	Total	Description
January 13, 2025	Santa Rosa, California	0	1	1	7 shots were fired, with 3 hitting a 16-year-old boy in a gang-related attack near Comstock Middle.
January 14, 2025	Newburgh, New York	0	0	0	Gunshots were fired near Newburgh Free Academy's main campus. The 18-year-old suspect was arrested.
January 22, 2025	Nashville, Tennessee	2	2 (Note: 1 by gunfire)	4	Antioch High School shooting: A 17-year-old male student shot and killed a 16-year-old girl and injured another student in the cafeteria of Antioch High School. Another student received a facial injury from a fall.
January 27, 2025	Kent, Washington	0	0	0	17-year-old student fired a gun at another student during a fight at Kentridge High School's parking lot. No injuries were reported.
January 30, 2025	Madisonville, Tennessee	0	0	0	Shots were fired near Madisonville Primary School. The suspect was arrested.
February 1, 2025	Pasadena, Texas	0	1	1	A man in his 80s entered Pasadena Memorial High School during a band competition and fired two shots, striking a victim in the shoulder. The injured man was taken to a hospital in stable condition. The suspect was tackled and detained by parents at the competition.
February 6, 2025	Huntsville, Alabama	0	0	0	A gun inside a second-grader's backpack went off at Challenger Elementary School, striking another student's laptop.
February 10, 2025	Seattle, Washington	0	0	0	Bullets struck the Roxhill Annex building, forcing two Seattle schools that host classes inside the building into lockdown.
February 12, 2025	Winston-Salem, North Carolina	0	1	1	A Winston-Salem State University student was shot in a residence hall. Police determined the shooting was not deliberate. One person was arrested.
February 19, 2025	Tallahassee, Florida	0	0	0	Shots were fired in a Tallahassee State College parking lot.
February 19, 2025	San Francisco, California	0	1	1	A teenager, reportedly a non-student of the aforementioned school, was shot one block away from St. Ignatius College Preparatory, as classes were in session. His injuries were deemed serious, but non-life threatening. A suspect, another teen male, was arrested later that day. In March 2025, police ruled that the shooting was accidental.
February 23, 2025	Lancaster, Pennsylvania	0	0	0	A shooting was reported at Thaddeus Stevens College of Technology.
February 25, 2025	Montgomery County, Maryland	0	0	0	Multiple people dressed in black and wearing masks fired shots during a fight on campus at Bethesda-Chevy Chase High School. No casualties were reported.
February 26, 2025	Norfolk, Virginia	2	0	2	Two people were shot and killed in an Old Dominion University parking lot.
March 2, 2025	Baton Rouge, Louisiana	0	1	1	A person was shot in a Southern University dorm room. A suspect was arrested by U.S. Marshals in Texas.
March 4, 2025	Halethorpe, Maryland	1	0	1	A 16-year-old student of Lansdowne High School was shot and killed on school grounds by an unknown gunman. No arrests were made.
March 12, 2025	Grambling, Louisiana	0	0	0	A shooting occurred outside of a Grambling State University hall. Three people were arrested.
March 27, 2025	Frisco, Texas	0	0	0	A bullet was accidentally fired through a window at Pete and Gracie Hosp Elementary School. Nobody was injured, though the school was dismissed early for safety reasons.
March 27, 2025	Philadelphia, Pennsylvania	0	1	1	A 15-year-old was shot in the arm during Eid al-Fitr celebrations at Temple University. Thirteen people were arrested, including eleven juveniles.
April 7, 2025	Spotsylvania County, Virginia	0	0	0	A 3rd-grade student who brought his parents' gun to Lee Hill Elementary School in his backpack accidentally fired it while reaching into his bag. The boy's parents were charged with child endangerment.
April 10, 2025	Houston, Texas	0	2	2	Two students were shot and wounded near the Wisdom High School campus, at 4:45 p.m.; no serious injuries were reported. One person was arrested later in April, and two others are sought as of May 8.
April 8, 2025	Lakeland South, Washington	0	1	1	A 13-year-old boy was arrested for shooting another child on the playground at Lakeland Elementary School.
April 10, 2025	White Plains, Maryland	0	0	0	A 9-year-old student who brought his parents' gun to Billingsley Elementary School in his backpack accidentally fired it while reaching in his bag.
April 10, 2025	Omaha, Nebraska	0	1	1	A man was shot in the shoulder on the Metropolitan Community College campus. Police said the shooting was the result of road rage.
April 10, 2025	Newark, Delaware	0	1	1	A school bus driver accidentally shot himself inside ASPIRA Charter High School.
April 15, 2025	Dallas, Texas	0	4	4	Four students were shot at Wilmer-Hutchins High School.
April 16, 2025	San Antonio, Texas	1	0	1	A student was fatally shot after a person pulled a gun and opened fire during a fight with seven other people on the Brewer Academy campus.
April 17, 2025	Tallahassee, Florida	2	7	9	2025 Florida State University shooting: Phoenix Ikner, a 20-year-old student and stepson of a sheriff's deputy, opened fire outside the Student Union building with a handgun. Two people were killed, and six others were wounded by gunfire; additional individuals were injured while fleeing. The shotgun the shooter carried failed to discharge.
April 19, 2025	Norfolk, Virginia	0	2	2	Two men were shot on the Norfolk State University campus.
April 19, 2025	Conway, Arkansas	0	1	1	A student at the University of Central Arkansas was shot in the leg near the student center. Officials said the victim was a bystander. One person was arrested.
April 22, 2025	New York City, New York	1	1	2	A person was killed, and another was injured outside a Ridgewood, Queens high school in Queens, nearly three hours after school dismissal, but also when some students were on campus for nighttime activities.
April 23, 2025	Suisun City, California	0	1	1	An 11-year-old boy was shot by an elementary school several hours post-dismissal. His injuries were deemed to be non-life threatening. As of May 2026, no public news articles report any arrests were made in connection with the incident, and police say the victim may have not been the intended target by the gunman.
April 27, 2025	Elizabeth City, North Carolina	1	6	7	A shooting occurred during a Yard Fest celebration at Elizabeth City State University. One non-student was killed, and six people were injured, four by gunfire.
April 27, 2025	Normal, Illinois	0	1	1	A person was shot during a fight outside an event held in the student center of Illinois State University.
April 30, 2025	Los Angeles, California	0	0	0	A student at Westside Global Awareness Magnet School in the Venice neighborhood brought a handgun from home and showed it to a friend. When a teacher noticed the gun, the boy attempted to hide it, accidentally firing it in the process. The boy fled the campus and was later taken into custody.
May 1, 2025	Ettrick, Virginia	0	1	1	A person was shot in the leg on a basketball court on the Virginia State University campus.
May 2, 2025	Inglewood, California	1	1	2	A security guard shot two women on the Spartan College of Aeronautics and Technology campus in Inglewood. One of the victims, the dean of student affairs, later died of her injuries.
May 15, 2025	Philadelphia, Pennsylvania	1	1	2	Two teenagers were shot in a courtyard at Logan Elementary School.
May 19, 2025	Platteville, Wisconsin	2	0	2	University of Wisconsin-Platteville shooting: A student at the University of Wisconsin-Platteville shot and killed another student in a dorm building in a murder-suicide.
June 24, 2025	Lubbock, Texas	1	2	3	Texas Tech University Police officers were checking on a suspicious vehicle outside the Jones AT&T Stadium when the driver produced a gun and fired at them, injuring two officers. Officers shot and killed the gunman.
June 24, 2025	Culver City, California	0	0	0	At a vigil for a teenager who was slain at a pool party in nearby Torrance, a physical fight escalated on the campus of Culver City High School during non-school hours, between two parties, and at least one person allegedly fired a gun at at least one individual; no one was hit or wounded by the gunfire. A 17-year-old girl and a male were arrested, and the male was arrested for attempted murder, and the female was arrested for other charges, or her charges were pending.
July 25, 2025	Albuquerque, New Mexico	1	1	2	Two people were shot in a University of New Mexico dorm. The two victims were not students, but they were visiting a student when the shooting occurred.
August 8, 2025	Atlanta, Georgia	2	0	2	A man fired at a Centers for Disease Control building on the Emory University campus. He shot and killed a police officer before killing himself.
August 10, 2025	Plano, Texas	0	1	1	A student at Collin College was shot in a parking lot outside student housing. Another student was arrested for the shooting.
August 15, 2025	Raleigh, North Carolina	0	0	0	A shooting was reported at Southeast Raleigh Magnet High School during a football game.
August 17, 2025	Frankfort, Kentucky	0	2	2	Two people were injured in a drive-by shooting on the Kentucky State University campus.
August 26, 2025	Minneapolis, Minnesota	1	6	7	A gunman opened fire on a group of 7 people just outside Cristo Rey Jesuit High School in Minneapolis around 1:30 p.m., killing 1 and injuring 6. The gunman fired 30 rounds before fleeing in a vehicle. Police have stated that at least one of the victims was targeted. The gunman, as well as two accomplices, would come to be arrested in the following days.
August 27, 2025	Minneapolis, Minnesota	3	21	24	Annunciation Catholic Church shooting: A gunman opened fire at Annunciation Catholic School during morning mass, killing two and injuring 21 others.
September 10, 2025	Orem, Utah	1	0	1	Assassination of Charlie Kirk: Conservative activist Charlie Kirk was assassinated during an event at Utah Valley University.
September 10, 2025	Evergreen, Colorado	1	2	3	Evergreen High School shooting: Three people were shot outside Evergreen High School, including the 16-year-old shooter, who committed suicide.
September 11, 2025	Annapolis, Maryland	0	2	2	A man who was kicked out of the United States Naval Academy sent threats over social media pretending he was at the academy. As the school was placed under lockdown, rumors spread that a gunman was disguised as a police officer, leading a sheltering-in-place midshipman to hit a real police officer with his training weapon. The officer shot and injured the midshipman.
October 1, 2025	Highlands Ranch, Colorado	0	0	0	A man living near Ranch View Middle School accidentally fired his gun while handling it, sending a bullet into an exterior door at the school.
October 4, 2025	Orangeburg, South Carolina	1	1	2	One person was killed, and one was injured in a shooting near a South Carolina State University dorm building during homecoming weekend.
October 4, 2025	Orangeburg, South Carolina	0	1	1	A man was shot at South Carolina State University. Police said the shooting was unrelated to the earlier shooting that also occurred at SCSU on the same day.
October 9, 2025	Frisco, Texas	1	0	1	A man was fatally shot in the parking lot of Frisco High School, where he had driven after a road rage incident involving another driver. The other driver was arrested at the scene.
October 10, 2025	Heidelberg, Mississippi	2	1	3	Three people were shot at Heidelberg High School campus during a football game, two of whom died. The shooting was one of three that occurred on the same day during high school homecoming events in Mississippi, including a mass shooting in Leland that killed six and a shooting in Rolling Fork.
October 10, 2025	Rolling Fork, Mississippi	0	1	1	A person was shot outside South Delta High School. Two people were arrested.
October 11, 2025	Lorman, Mississippi	1	2	3	A woman was killed, and two others were injured in a shooting near the Industrial Technology Building at Alcorn State University.
October 19, 2025	Peoria, Illinois	0	1	1	A woman was shot in the abdomen at a Bradley University residence hall. The woman identified a man as the shooter but said it was accidental.
October 19, 2025	Stillwater, Oklahoma	0	3	3	Three people, including a student, were injured in a shooting at a Oklahoma State University dormitory.
October 24, 2025	Washington, D.C.	0	5	5	Five people were shot outside a Howard University building.
October 25, 2025	Lower Oxford Township, Pennsylvania	1	6	7	At least seven people were shot at Lincoln University during a homecoming event.
October 29, 2025	Atlanta, Georgia	0	0	0	An employee at a Georgia Tech dining hall was arrested for firing a gun following an argument with a coworker.
November 3, 2025	Morrisville, New York	0	1	1	A non-student was shot in the neck at the State University of New York at Morrisville, causing the campus to go on lockdown.
November 12, 2025	Oakland, California	0	1	1	A student at Skyline High School was shot on campus. Two other students were arrested.
November 13, 2025	Oakland, California	1	0	1	Athletic director and former football coach John Beam was shot and killed in the field house of Laney College. A suspect was arrested. Beam and the Laney College football team had previously been profiled in the fifth season of the Netflix docuseries Last Chance U.
November 19, 2025	Socorro, New Mexico	1	0	1	A man was shot and killed at an intersection near the library at the New Mexico Institute of Mining and Technology. Authorities said the shooting may have been a case of mistaken identity.
December 2, 2025	San Francisco, California	0	1	1	A student at Phillip & Sala Burton High School was shot in the leg.
December 9, 2025	Frankfort, Kentucky	1	1	2	At Kentucky State University, a group of around 20 to 30 people assaulted a student and his family as they were moving him out of his dorm. The student's father shot two of the people, both students, killing one. The father was arrested, but a grand jury accepted his self-defense claim and declined to indict him.
December 12, 2025	Stewartville, Minnesota	1	1	2	An adult male shot and wounded a student athlete outside Stewartville High School. The shooter died of a self-inflicted gunshot wound.
December 13, 2025	Providence, Rhode Island	2	9	11	2025 Brown University shooting: A shooting occurred at an engineering building on the second day of finals at Brown University. A person of interest was arrested but was later released. The perpetrator later killed MIT Professor Nuno Loureiro at his home in Brookline, Massachusetts. He was later found at a storage unit in Salem, New Hampshire, having killed himself.

== 2026 ==
51 incidents.

Date	Location	Deaths	Injuries	Total	Description
January 6, 2026	Romulus, Michigan	0	0	0	A 44-year-old man attempted to enter Romulus Middle School with a handgun before firing shots at the building. The man was taken into custody, and no injuries were reported.
January 10, 2026	Flint, Michigan	0	1	1	During basketball games at Mott Community College, a group of people followed another man into the restroom and began assaulting him while one of them filmed. The man being assaulted shot at the group, striking the man filming. The district attorney ruled the shooting was self-defense, but the man was charged with bringing a firearm into a sports arena, a civil infraction. The man who was shot was charged with felony assault.
January 27, 2026	Detroit, Michigan	0	0	0	During a dispute at the Chatsworth Suites on the Wayne State University campus, a shot was fired.
February 3, 2026	Chicago, Illinois	1	0	1	A woman was shot in a University of Illinois Chicago parking garage while visiting UI Health for an appointment.
February 4, 2026	Glen Burnie, Maryland	0	1	1	A seven-year-old student accidentally shot himself in the hand at Freetown Elementary School.
February 9, 2026	Rockville, Maryland	0	1	1	A student was shot and injured at Thomas S. Wootton High School
February 12, 2026	Orangeburg, South Carolina	2	1	3	Three people were shot during a marijuana deal at a South Carolina State University dorm. The two deceased and the suspected shooter were not affiliated with the university, while the injured man was a student.
March 12, 2026	Norfolk, Virginia	2	2	4	2026 Old Dominion University shooting: A gunman opened fire at an ROTC course at Old Dominion University, shooting three people, killing one. The shooter was also killed. He was a former National Guardsman who had previously been convicted of providing material support of ISIS.
March 26, 2026	New Orleans, Louisiana	1	2	3	Following an argument, a man shot and injured another man outside the Tulane University School of Medicine, also striking a Tulane employee walking nearby. A Tulane University Police officer fatally shot the suspect.
March 30, 2026	Bulverde, Texas	1	1	2	A 15-year-old student at Hill Country College Preparatory High School shot and wounded a teacher before killing himself.
April 7, 2026	Pauls Valley, Oklahoma	0	1	1	A 20-year-old man entered Pauls Valley High School and attempted to shoot two students before the principal of the school tackled him. In the ensuing struggle, the principal was shot once in his leg, and the shooter was disarmed.
April 8, 2026	Chicago, Illinois	1	0	1	A student at Safe Achieve Academy was killed in a drive-by shooting as he ran towards the school. Several bullets hit the front entrance.
April 10, 2026	Sacramento, California	1	0	1	A teenager was shot and killed at Natomas High School. The district attorney declined to charge the shooter, saying the deceased had attempted to rob him and was shot in self-defense.
April 13, 2026	Horace, North Dakota	0	1	1	A construction worker was shot in the hand at a Heritage Middle School parking lot. A co-worker of the victim was arrested.
May 5, 2026	Grand Rapids, Michigan	2	0	2	At 6:30 p.m., 4 hours post-dismissal, a man allegedly asked a 14-year-old boy if he had any gang affiliation while they were both at a soccer game that was held at a park next to Southwest Elementary School. This led to a verbal dispute and the suspect shot to death both the boy and a 39-year-old unrelated woman who reportedly came to his defense. A second child was also shot at, but missed. Police found nine bullet casings on scene. An 18-year-old man was arrested the following day, and is facing two murder charges.
May 18, 2026	San Diego, California	5	0	5	2026 Islamic Center of San Diego shooting: Three people were killed on the mosque's campus, which contained the Bright Horizon Academy, a K-12 grade school; no students were injured, although they were escorted out from the campus by authorities. The two gunmen, ages 17 and 18, who had no known affiliation with the school or mosque, committed joint suicide in a car adjacent to the mosque campus. Police found items alluding to Neo-Nazi symbolism in the vehicle owned by the shooters.
June 3, 2026	Fairfield, California	1	3	4	2026 Fairfield High School shooting: During a Sem Yeto High School graduation ceremony held at Schafer Stadium next to Fairfield High School a shooting happened killing one graduate and injuring three more people including an 11-year-old girl.
June 17, 2026	Chester, Pennsylvania	0	3	3	Three people were shot in the parking lot of a pizza restaurant located on the Widener University campus.
July 10, 2026	Anchorage, Alaska	0	0	0	Police responded to a reported car break-in at University of Alaska Anchorage. They located a suspect, who fired a shot in the air before fleeing.
July 31, 2026	Oakland, California	1	1	2	A shooting happened at the Oakland Adult and Career Education Resource Center killing a 25-year-old student and injuring another person.
August 8, 2026	Norfolk, Virginia	0	1	1	A person in a vehicle accidentally fired a gun during move-in day at Norfolk State University, hitting themselves in or near the foot.
August 10, 2026	Chicago, Illinois	2	0	2	A custodian at Mark Twain Elementary School in Chicago's South Side shot a co-worker before killing himself.
August 12, 2026	Warner Robins, Georgia	0	1	1	During a verbal altercation in a bathroom at Warner Robins High School, a 14-year-old student shot a ninth grade student in the leg. The suspect was apprehended around half a mile away.
August 15, 2026	Ettrick, Virginia	0	5	5	Five people were shot at Virginia State University. Police said there were multiple shooters.
August 21, 2026	Bakersfield, California	1	0	1	A 17-year-old student was shot during at a football game at Independence High School. The 15-year-old was quickly arrested after the incident as the 17-year-old student died from his wounds.
August 28, 2026	Liberty, Allegheny County, Pennsylvania	0	0	0	A gunshot was fired at the end of a football game at South Allegheny Middle/Senior High School. A teenager was arrested.
September 2, 2026	Waynesboro, Virginia	1	1	2	A 19-year old man forced entry into Westwood Hills Elementary School, shooting and injuring a staff member before committing suicide in the library.
September 11, 2026	Manteca, California	0	0	0	A gun was fired into the air following a fight at a Manteca High School football game.
September 14, 2026	Chicago, Illinois	0	0	0	A 12-year-old student found a handgun in a bag in a school bus parked outside Minnie Miñoso Academy and fired it out the window. A Chicago Public Schools staff member, who owned the bag, was charged with carrying a firearm at a school, child endangerment and reckless conduct.
September 19, 2026	Notre Dame, Indiana	0	2	2	Two people, including a police officer, were injured in a shooting on the edge of the University of Notre Dame campus. The shooting occurred at the same time a football game was being played at Notre Dame Stadium north of the shooting scene.
September 24, 2026	Largo, Maryland	0	1	1	A teenager was shot outside Prince George's Community College.
September 24, 2026	Lafayette, Indiana	0	1	1	A man was shot in the parking of Ivy Tech Community College. Another man was arrested.
September 25, 2026	Mount Berry, Georgia	0	4	4	A man accidentally shot four hunters in the Berry College Wildlife Management Area.
September 25, 2026	Hobbs, New Mexico	0	1	1	A teacher was shot at Highland Middle School.
September 30, 2026	Omaha, Nebraska	0	0	0	A shooting occurred at the baseball fields at Omaha Burke High School.
October 2, 2026	Eden Prairie, Minnesota	0	2	2	Two people were shot during a football game at Eden Prairie High School.
October 2, 2026	Ocoee, Florida	0	1	1	A juvenile was shot in the leg outside Ocoee High School after a football game.
October 2, 2026	Indianapolis, Indiana	0	2	2	Two juveniles were shot after a football game at Warren Central High School.
October 7, 2026	Fort Valley, Georgia	0	1	1	A non-student was shot on the Fort Valley State University campus.
October 12, 2026	Fort Collins, Colorado	0	1	1	Police were called for a report of a man behaving erratically on the Colorado State University campus. When an officer confronted the man, a CSU student, he fired a shot into the side of a microbiology building. The officer shot and injured the student.
October 15, 2026	Bend, Oregon	5	2	7	2026 Silver Rail Elementary School shooting: A 16-year-old killed three students and a teacher at Silver Rail Elementary School. He also injured two others. An armed bystander followed the gunman into the school and fatally shot him.
October 17, 2026	Augusta, Georgia	0	3	3	Three people were shot in the parking lot of Lucy Craft Laney High School during a homecoming event.
October 19, 2026	Atlanta, Georgia	1	1	2	During a class at Atlanta Technical College, a student's gun discharged, hitting another student in the leg. The student whose gun discharged, a 60-year-old man, then entered a bathroom, where he shot and killed himself.
October 20, 2026	Aurora, Colorado	0	0	0	Two men got into an argument while waiting outside Rangeview High School to pick up their respective relatives. When one man walked towards the school to find a school resource officer, the other man fired at him. No injuries were reported.
October 20, 2026	Richmond, Virginia	0	1	1	A man was shot outside of a building at Virginia Union University.
October 24, 2026	Richmond, Virginia	0	3	3	A man was arrested for shooting two people at Virginia Union University during homecoming weekend. Officials said the man accidentally shot himself as well. It was the second shooting to occur at VUU in less than a week.
October 24, 2026	Tallahassee, Florida	0	12	12	Following a homecoming football game at Florida A&M University around 8:45 pm, a shooting occurred outside Bragg Memorial Stadium, injuring 12.
October 26, 2026	Baton Rouge, Louisiana	0	1	1	A man accidentally shot another man at Southern University.
November 1, 2026	Madison, Illinois	1	3	4	During a football game at Madison Senior High School, the lights went out, causing people to run onto the field. As people were running to the field, a fight broke out, leading to a shooting that killed a man and injured three people.
November 7, 2026	Winston-Salem, North Carolina	1	1	1	Two people were shot during homecoming celebrations at Winston-Salem State University. A man was arrested for the shooting, which occurred after a fight between two groups.
November 7, 2026	Winston-Salem, North Carolina	0	2	2	Less than an hour after the previous shooting, a second, unrelated shooting also occurred at Winston-Salem State. Two people were shot and injured. Following the two shootings, the university cancelled homecoming events.

== See also ==
- List of school shootings in the United States by death toll
- List of school shootings in the United States (before 2000)
- List of school shootings in Europe
- Lists of school-related attacks
- List of mass shootings in the United States
- List of unsuccessful attacks related to schools
