= University of North Carolina shooting =

University of North Carolina shooting may refer to one of two incidents that took place in the US state of North Carolina:

- 2019 University of North Carolina at Charlotte shooting, which killed two and injured four.
- Killing of Zijie Yan, which occurred at the University of North Carolina at Chapel Hill in 2023.
