= Culinary Institute =

Culinary Institute may refer to:

- The Culinary Institute of America
- Culinary Institute of the Pacific
- Culinary Institute of St. Louis
- Indian Culinary Institute, Tirupati
- Louisiana Culinary Institute
- New England Culinary Institute
- Niagara Falls Culinary Institute
- Oregon Culinary Institute
