= 2026 Sungai Raya school attack =

School attack in Indonesia

- Location: SMP Negeri 3 Sungai Raya, Sungai Raya, Kubu Raya Regency, West Kalimantan, Indonesia
- Date: February 3, 2026
- Target: Students and school teachers
- Attack type: Arson
- Weapons: Molotov cocktail; Firecrackers; Knife (Unused)
- Deaths: 0
- Injuries: 1
- Motive: Under investigation
- Accused: Unnamed 15 year old male

On the afternoon of February 3, 2026, a Molotov cocktail was thrown at SMP Negeri 3 Sungai Raya, Kubu Raya Regency, West Kalimantan, Indonesia, during recess at around 10:40 a.m. WIB. The incident did not result in any fatalities; only one person suffered minor injuries from shrapnel or debris during the explosion. The alleged perpetrator is a 9th grade student at the school.

== Incident ==
During the school break, when students were eating free nutritious meals, a 9th grade student brought and threw a homemade Molotov cocktail into the school environment. The homemade bomb was a bottle filled with fuel with a cloth wick, and when thrown, it caused sparks and smoke, accompanied by the explosion of several firecrackers that were also activated at the location. There were no fatalities, but one student suffered minor injuries from sparks or debris during the incident.

The school and local residents immediately took initial action to prevent the fire from spreading to the main school building, while the police arrived at the scene, set up a police line, and detained the suspected perpetrator for further investigation. After the incident, the National Police's Anti-terror Densus 88 Anti-terror Team together with related officers found six additional bottles of Molotov cocktails as well as other evidence such as five portable gas with firecrackers, nails, and knives. The bomber reportedly went crazy after his action.

== Suspected ==
The suspect is a 9th-grade student at the school. He used playing shooting games and had plans of becoming a mechanic. The police have secured the perpetrator for further investigation at the Kubu Raya Police. From the results of the initial investigation by the authorities, the perpetrator was exposed to violent content through the True Crime Community (TCC), and the alleged relationship between this behavior and psychological pressure including experiences of bullying is being investigated; Investigators are still investigating the full background and motive.

In his daily school life, the alleged perpetrator behaved like a typical student. However, he is suspected of experiencing psychological stress due to a number of issues possibly related to his actions. Previously, the alleged perpetrator had been under police surveillance, but this surveillance was no longer as intensive as problems within the family.

=== Investigation ===
The Densus 88 spokesperson Police Commissioner Mayndra Eka Wardhana confirmed that the attacker carried in his backpack, there were various symbols, numerology (possibly the number of kills from various mass murder events), sigils, and the names of previous school attackers such as Adam Lanza, Seung-Hui Cho, Salvador Rolando Ramos, and Timur Bekmansurov, the Pulse nightclub shooter Omar Mateen, incel-misogynist killer Elliot Rodger, Las Vegas attacker Stephen Paddock, and Brenton Tarrant.

Besides these names, there are also other inscriptions, namely #ZeroDay and TCC. Zero Day refers to a film about school shootings, while TCC stands for "True Crime Community," an online community associated with the spread of violent and extremist content.
