= 2026 Aubagne school shooting =

School shooting in Aubagne, France

- Location of Joseph Lakanal Middle School
- Location: Joseph Lakanal Middle School, Aubagne, Bouches-du-Rhône, France
- Date: 12 October 2026
- Weapon: 12-gauge hunting shotgun
- Deaths: 0
- Injuries: 3
- Motive: Under investigation by authorities
- Accused: 14-year-old boy

On 12 October 2026, a school shooting occurred at Joseph Lakanal Middle School (French: Collège Joseph Lakanal) in Aubagne, Bouches-du-Rhône, France. A 14-year-old student opened fire with a 12-gauge shotgun, injuring three staff members. The student was detained, but the motive behind the shooting is unknown.

== Background ==
The shooting occurred amid widespread student protests across France over school conditions. The demonstrations had intensified over the preceding two weeks, with at least 260,000 people participating in multiple cities, including Paris, Marseille, Nantes and Lyon. Approximately half of France's 3,700 high schools were reportedly closed or partially closed because of the protests. However, Le Parisien reported that the attack was unrelated to the protests.

== Shooting ==
On 12 October 2026, a 14-year-old student entered Joseph Lakanal Middle School with a 12-gauge shotgun hidden within a guitar case. He roamed around two of the school's floors, opening fire several times. On the first floor, he fired at a 37-year-old teacher who was shot in the thigh and the school's 53-year-old headteacher who was shot in the leg. A third staff member also suffered a graze wound. The suspect was subdued by a staff member in the stairwell.

== Investigation ==
The National Anti-Terrorist Prosecutor's Office confirmed preliminary examinations of the perpetrator's digital devices have revealed potential links to the True Crime Community, an online movement associated with the glorification of mass killings. This represents the first instance globally where a state judiciary officially designated an attack linked to the TCC as an act of terrorism.

The boy told investigators that the attack was carried out as retaliation for alleged bullying by teachers and classmates, a claim prosecutors said had not been corroborated.

== Reactions ==
Minister of National Education Édouard Geffray condemned the shooting as an "unacceptable act" that "again highlights the rise of unbridled violence in our society" and called for resistance against such activities.
