= SIG Sauer P322 =

Semi-automatic pistol

- Type: Semi-automatic pistol
- Place of origin: Germany

Production history
- Manufacturer: SIG Sauer
- Produced: 2022–present

Specifications
- Mass: 484 g (17.1 oz)
- Length: 178 mm (7.0 in)
- Barrel length: 101.6 mm (4.00 in)
- Width: 36 mm
- Height: 140 mm
- Cartridge: .22 Long Rifle
- Action: Blowback
- Feed system: 10-, 20- or 25-round detachable box magazine
- Sights: Adjustable open sights

The SIG Sauer P322 is a semi-automatic pistol chambered for .22 Long Rifle (5.59 mm Caliber) rimfire ammunition.

Manufactured by SIG Sauer, it was introduced in 2022 and has become very popular among shooting sports. The P322 was a .22-caliber version of the popular P365 XL.

== See also ==
- SIG Sauer Mosquito
- FN 502
- Glock 44
- Walther P22
- Ruger SR22
- Taurus TX22
- Smith & Wesson M&P22
