= Killing of Zijie Yan =

2023 homicide in Chapel Hill, North Carolina

- Dr. Zijie Yan
- Location: Caudill Labs, University of North Carolina; Chapel Hill, North Carolina, U.S.
- Date: August 28, 2023; 3 years ago c. 1:02 p.m. (EDT)
- Attack type: School shooting
- Weapon: Glock 43X 9 mm handgun
- Victim: Zijie Yan
- Accused: Tailei Qi
- Charges: First-degree murder
- Verdict: "Not guilty by reason of insanity"

On August 28, 2023, Zijie Yan, an associate professor at the University of North Carolina (UNC) in Chapel Hill, North Carolina, United States, was shot and killed on campus. 34-year-old Tailei Qi, one of his graduate students, was arrested and charged with first-degree murder. The shooting sent the university into lockdown for three hours. On September 18, 2026, Qi was found "not guilty by reason of insanity" by a North Carolina state superior court judge.

== Persons involved ==
=== Zijie Yan ===
Zijie Yan
- 严资杰
- Born: 1984 or 1985; Jingmen, Hubei, China
- Died: August 28, 2023; Chapel Hill, North Carolina, U.S.
- Education: Huazhong University of Science and Technology (BS, MS); Rensselaer Polytechnic Institute (PhD)
- Scientific career
- Fields: Materials engineering
- Workplaces: University of Chicago; Clarkson University; University of North Carolina at Chapel Hill
- Thesis: Particle generation by pulsed excimer laser ablation in liquid: Hollow structures and laser-induced reactions (2011)
- Doctoral advisor: Douglas B. Chrisey
- Website: yan.web.unc.edu (archived)

Zijie Yan (Chinese: 严资杰; 1984 or 1985 – August 28, 2023) was a Chinese materials engineer from the city of Jingmen, Hubei Province.

Yan graduated from the Huazhong University of Science and Technology in Wuhan, receiving bachelor's degrees with majors in materials and computer science in 2005, as well as a master's degree in physical electronics in 2007.

Yan travelled to the United States for doctoral studies. He received a Doctor of Philosophy in materials engineering from Rensselaer Polytechnic Institute in 2011. His doctoral dissertation was titled Particle generation by pulsed excimer laser ablation in liquid: Hollow structures and laser-induced reactions (2011). His doctoral advisor was Douglas B. Chrisey. He also published 17 research articles during his time at Rensselaer.

As a postdoctoral fellow at the University of Chicago from 2011 to 2015, Yan helped develop a new material called optical matter consisting of metal nanoparticles held together by light. He was an assistant professor at Clarkson University in Potsdam, New York, from 2015 to 2019.

Beginning in 2019, Yan was an associate professor in the Department of Applied Physical Sciences at the University of North Carolina at Chapel Hill, running a lab that conducted nanoparticle research with optical tweezers (lasers). He lived in Apex, North Carolina, and had two young daughters. Friends and colleagues described him as always warm and enthusiastic about his research.

=== Suspect ===
Tailei Qi (Chinese: 齐太磊; born 1988 or 1989) was raised in a farming family in the small village of Dasha (Chinese: 大沙), Fengqiu County, Henan Province, in northern China. He received a bachelor's degree from Wuhan University in 2015 and a master's degree in materials science from Louisiana State University in 2021. He joined Yan's research group at the University of North Carolina in January 2022, one of three doctoral students in the group. In late 2022, he wrote several cryptic social media posts expressing frustration with the atmosphere of his workplace. Co-workers at North Carolina said he was quiet but friendly.

== Shooting ==
On the afternoon of Monday August 28, 2023, a week into the fall 2023 semester at the University of North Carolina, the suspect drove to campus and went into the Caudill Labs chemistry building. According to UNC Chapel Hill Police chief Brian James, the suspect went straight to Yan and fatally shot him, then immediately left the building and walked off campus. At 1:02 p.m., a 9-1-1 caller reported gunfire at Caudill Labs, identifying the suspect by name and describing his clothing and the direction he went. The Alert Carolina warning system activated at 1:03 p.m., sounding sirens across campus and sending emails and text messages ordering people to shelter indoors.

Some students locked or barricaded themselves in classrooms or closets, while teaching continued in some classes. Rumors on social media inflated the number of reported shooters or victims. While searching for the suspect, UNC Police briefly mistakenly detained another Asian man near the site of the shooting. At 2:21 p.m., a 9-1-1 caller reported someone matching the suspect's police description in the woods near their house on Williams Circle, in a residential area about two miles (3 km) north of campus. The Chapel Hill Police Department arrested the suspect on Williams Circle around 2:31–2:38 p.m. Alert Carolina issued an "all clear" order at 4:15 p.m., after police spent some time searching unsuccessfully for the gun used in the shooting.

== Legal proceedings ==
On August 29, 2023, Qi was charged with two felonies, first-degree murder and possessing a weapon on school property, and held without bail at the Orange County Jail in Hillsborough. On September 19, at a hearing in superior court at the Orange County Courthouse, Qi's attorneys requested that he undergo a competency evaluation in the case and the suspect requested new attorneys to represent him. The judge set a new court date tentatively for November 14. On November 27, he had been found unfit to continue to trial due to his untreated schizophrenia and that he would be admitted to Central Regional Hospital in Butner, North Carolina for psychiatric treatment.

On March 25, 2026, Qi was found competent to stand trial, and his defense team announced they would pursue a possible insanity plea. North Carolina 18th Prosecutorial District Attorney Jeff Nieman indicated he would not pursue the death penalty, keeping in line with his moral beliefs.

=== Court verdict ===
On September 18, 2026, Judge Allen Baddour of the North Carolina Superior Court District 18, at the Orange County Courthouse in Hillsborough, North Carolina, ruled that Qi met the legal definition of insanity at the time of the shooting and found him "not guilty by reason of insanity". Following the trial, Qi was committed indefinitely at the Central Regional Hospital.

== Aftermath ==
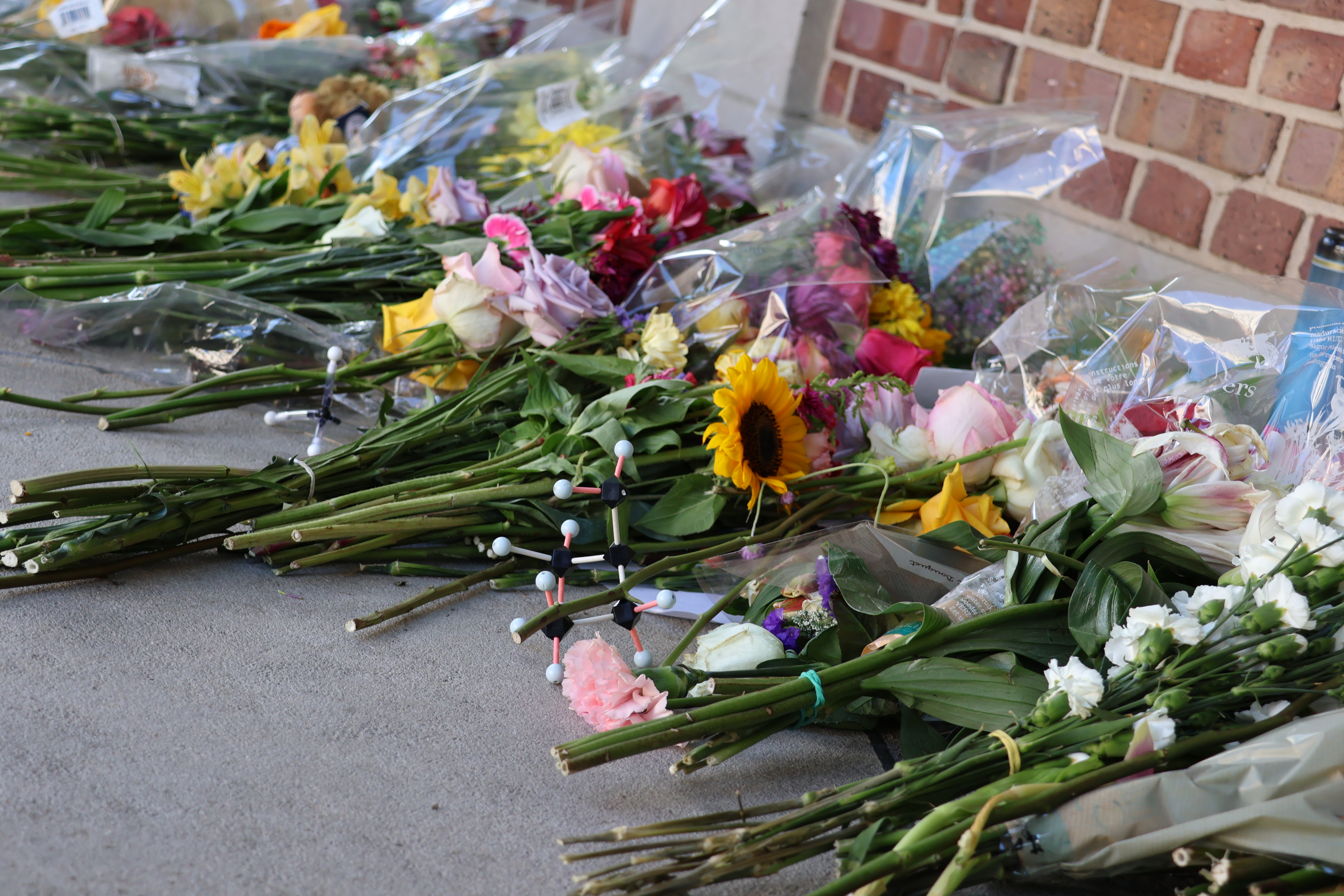
Memorial at the Morehead-Patterson Bell Tower

UNC Chapel Hill cancelled classes until 11:59 p.m. on Wednesday, August 30, 2023. On the night of August 29, several first-year students organized a candlelit vigil outside of Carolina Union attended by hundreds of people.

Further remembrances took place on August 30, 2023. The Morehead-Patterson Bell Tower rang in honor of Yan at 1:02 p.m., and hundreds of people gathered there to observe a moment of silence; flowers, letters, and other items were laid in memorial at the base of the bell tower. The front page of the Daily Tar Heel student newspaper, depicting text messages sent and received by students during the lockdown, went viral on social media. University chapters of March for Our Lives, Young Democrats, and Students Demand Action held a gun control rally at South Building. In the evening of August 30, about 5,000 people attended a candlelit vigil at the Dean Smith Center, where chancellor Kevin Guskiewicz and other faculty members spoke in Yan's memory.

North Carolina Asian-American groups held a vigil at the Cary Arts Center in Cary, North Carolina, on September 6, 2023. In the months following the incident, many graduate students called for additional University action on mental health within the graduate school, due to strains from the structure of principal investigator-student relationships. The Bell Tower rang again with Hark the Sound at 1:15 p.m. on August 28, 2024 "in honor of Dr. Yan's memory".

UNC Chapel Hill entered into an unrelated lockdown two weeks later on September 13, 2023. UNC Police arrested a former temporary worker for university housekeeping who had reportedly brandished a firearm toward a worker at the Alpine Bagel café in the student union building; there were no gunshots.

== See also ==
- Theodore Streleski
- 1996 San Diego State University shooting
- List of school shootings in the United States (2020s)
- List of school shootings in the United States by death toll
