= 2025 Evergreen High School shooting =

School shooting in Colorado, U.S.

Evergreen High School shooting
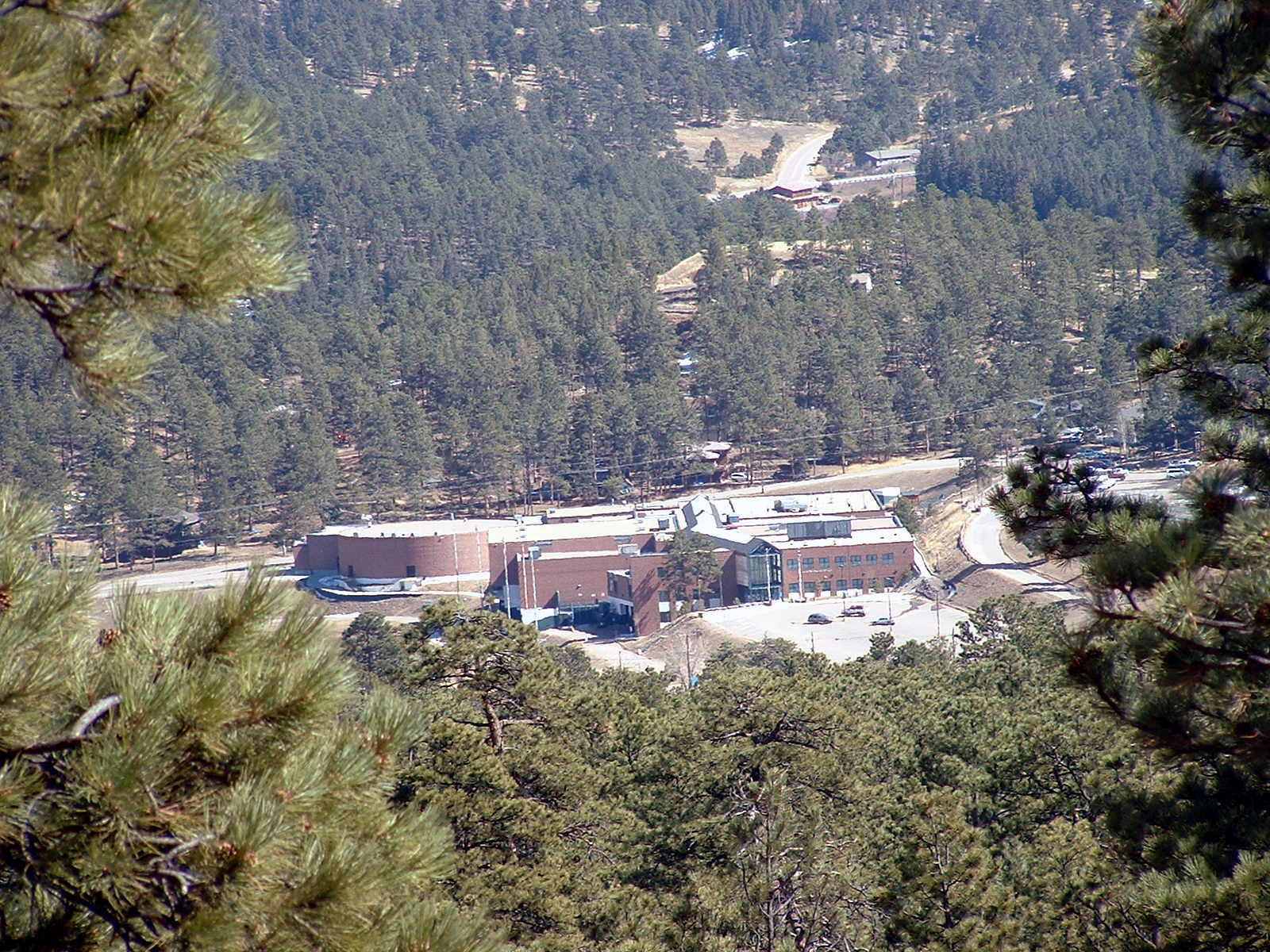
- Evergreen High School, March 2004
- Location: 39.621778°N 105.331639°W; Evergreen High School, Evergreen, Colorado, U.S.
- Date: September 10, 2025; 12:21 p.m. – 12:33 p.m. (MDT; UTC−07:00)
- Target: Students of Evergreen High School
- Attack type: School shooting
- Weapon: .38 caliber Smith & Wesson Model 36 revolver
- Deaths: 1 (the perpetrator)
- Injuries: 2
- Perpetrator: Desmond Holly
- Motive: Mental illness; Social isolation; Extremism

On September 10, 2025, a school shooting occurred at Evergreen High School in Evergreen, Colorado, United States. A 16-year-old student, Desmond Holly, shot and critically injured two students before killing himself.

Authorities said Holly fired about 20 rounds over the course of nine minutes, both inside and outside the school building. Investigators later said he had been exposed to extremist online material and appeared to have adopted neo-Nazi beliefs before the attack, though the precise motive remains under investigation.

The shooting occurred around the same time as a shooting at Utah Valley University that killed right-wing activist Charlie Kirk. The death of Charlie Kirk drew wider media attention and largely overshadowed the shooting at Evergreen high school.

== Shooting ==
On September 10, 2025, at about 12:21 p.m. MDT, a student at Evergreen High School opened fire with a revolver inside and outside the school building. According to authorities, the shooter fired about 20 rounds over the course of roughly nine minutes before killing himself. Two students were critically injured during the attack. Security doors prevented the suspect from entering other areas of the school, which authorities said likely reduced the number of casualties.

=== Timeline of shooting ===
A timeline was released by Jefferson County, Colorado on October 10, 2025.

Time	Event
12:21:14	The first shot was fired by the shooter inside the school.
12:21:40	The first victim was then shot.
12:21:56	A lockdown was initiated by school staff.
12:22:15	The first 911 call was made.
12:23:30	The shooter exited the school building.
12:24:09	A deputy was dispatched to the school.
12:24:26	Another deputy deployed himself to the school.
12:27:22	The first deputy arrived at the school.
12:30:29	The shooter confronted a deputy with a gun pointed at him.
12:31:37	The deputies performed life-saving measures on a second victim.
12:33:24	The shooter committed suicide by gunshot.

== Victims ==
The 18-year-old victim, later identified as Matthew Silverstone, suffered gunshot wounds to the head and chest and underwent emergency surgery. Silverstone's heart stopped twice after he was shot, once at the scene and once in an ambulance on the way to the hospital.

The 14-year-old victim was also critically injured but was released from the hospital in early October 2025. According to his family, he confronted the shooter at close range and gave other students time to escape.

== Perpetrator ==
A photo posted to TikTok by Holly, showing him holding a revolver to his head in the back mirror.

The shooter was identified as 16-year-old Desmond Holly (May 13, 2009 — September 10, 2025), a student at the school. After investigating Holly's phone, investigators reported that Holly had been exposed to extremist online material and appeared to have adopted neo-Nazi and Nihilist ideology in the months before the attack, being radicalized by an "extremist network". Officials also indicated that Holly had “struggled considerably” during the COVID-19 lockdowns and from significant bullying during middle school, and noted that Holly may have expressed significant interest in previous school shootings, though the precise motive of the attack remains under investigation,

Holly’s sister described him as “quiet, creative and increasingly withdrawn” as he entered high school. Holly had continuously referred to his sister as a “Femoid”, to which his sister didnt believe he was using in a derogatory way. Several witness interviews, including the sisters’, indicated that Holly had participated in the school’s “Gender and Sexuality Alliance” as a straight ally. His sister also noted that Holly was in a previous relationship with another boy prior to the shooting, however survivors recalled that Holly was shouting homophobic slurs shortly before the shooting began.

Investigators found that Holly had several TikTok accounts, filled with white supremacist symbols. According to the Anti-Defamation League's Center on Extremism, he was active on the app's "True Crime Community", where participating users have a fascination of mass murderers and serial killers. His profile picture on the app was an edited image of Elliot Rodger, perpetrator of the 2014 Isla Vista killings. A few days before the shooting, Holly posted a picture on the app in a pose similar to the perpetrator of the 2024 Abundant Life Christian School shooting with a shirt he made similar to the one worn by Dylan Klebold during the 1999 Columbine High School massacre; he also shared the image of the Abundant Life Christian School shooter he was imitating in the post as well. One user on the app encouraged Holly to be a "hero", also telling him to get a patch of the Black Sun, a Nazi-era symbol infamously worn by the perpetrators behind the 2019 Christchurch mosque shootings and the 2022 Buffalo supermarket shooting. TikTok banned all accounts associated with Holly two days after the shooting.

The Anti-Defamation League also claim Holly also had an account on Watch People Die, a "gore forum". He made the account between the Abundant Life Christian School shooting and the 2025 Antioch High School shooting. In an email, administrators of the site claim Holly lied about his age to create the account, and he wasn't active on it. They refer to Holly and the Antioch High School shooter as "unhinged losers".

The Anti-Defamation League further claimed that they reported Holly's TikTok account to the Federal Bureau of Investigation months before the shooting. The FBI opened an assessment into the account in July, and continued it until the shooting, they were reportedly attempting to identify the name and location of the user behind the account, which they failed to do, therefore they had no probable cause for arrest or additional law enforcement action at the federal level.

== Aftermath ==
Jefferson County Public Schools closed Evergreen High School in the days following the shooting. When classes resumed, the district assigned a full-time school resource officer to the campus and increased on-site security personnel.

Hundreds of residents attended a community vigil the day after the shooting, and a temporary support center was established for students, parents, and staff. In the weeks that followed, officials also investigated several possible threats reported on social media, which they later determined were either unfounded or posts by students processing the trauma of the shooting.

During the shooting, Holly used a .38-caliber Smith & Wesson revolver, purchased in 1996 in Florida, that originally belonged to a grandparent and was kept in a safe in his home. On February 4, 2026, the Jefferson County Sheriff’s Office announced Holly's parents would not be charged in connection with the shooting.

== See also ==
- Columbine effect
- List of school shootings in the United States (2000–present)
- List of school shootings in the United States by death toll
