= 2024 Abundant Life Christian School shooting =

Mass shooting in Wisconsin, U.S.

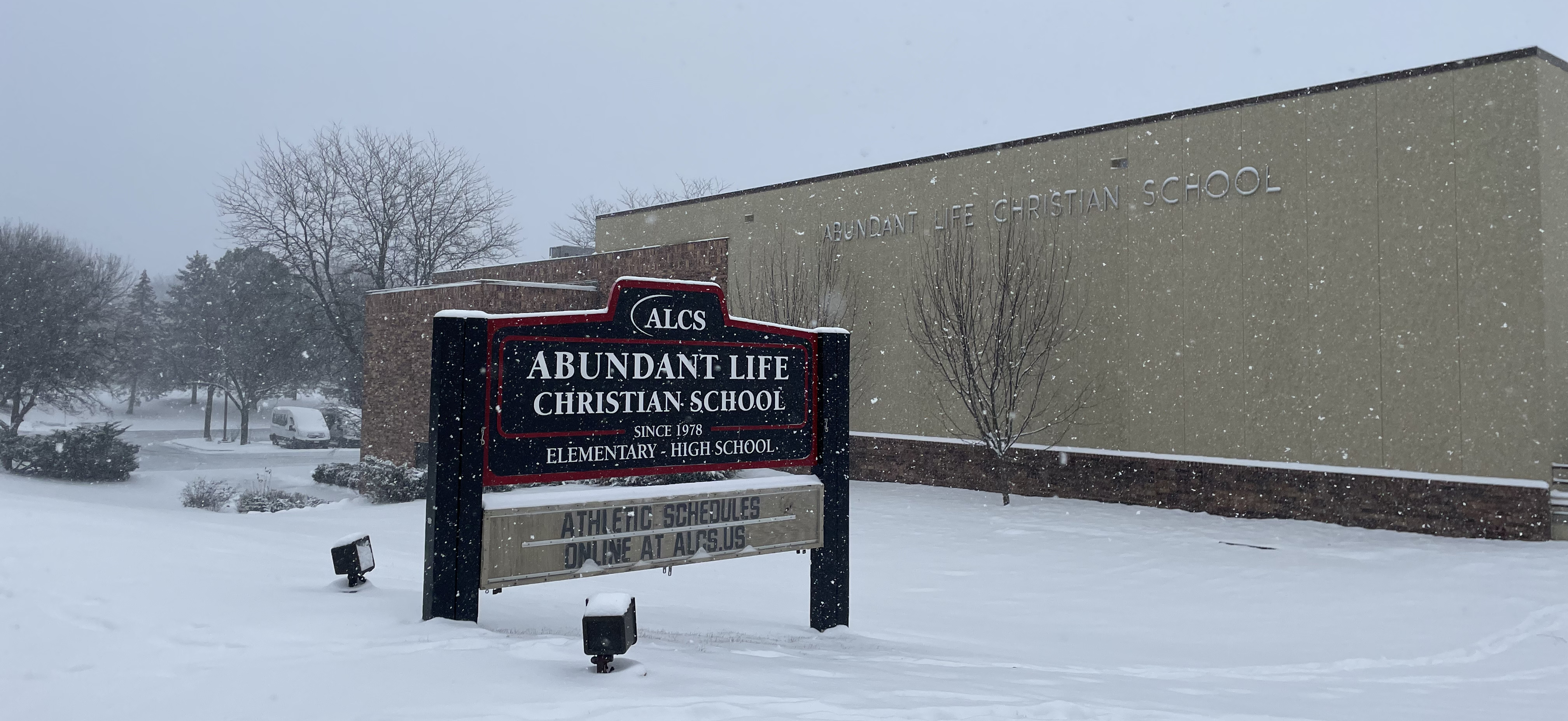
- The exterior of Abundant Life Christian School 3 days after the shooting.

- Abundant Life Christian School (Wisconsin) Abundant Life Christian School (the United States)
- Location: 43°04′22.3″N 89°17′57.2″W; Madison, Wisconsin, U.S.
- Date: December 16, 2024; 22 months ago c. 10:57 – 11:05 a.m. (CST; UTC−06:00)
- Target: Abundant Life Christian School
- Attack type: School shooting; mass shooting; murder–suicide
- Weapons: 9mm Glock 19 Gen4 semi-automatic pistol; .22 LR SIG Sauer P322 semi-automatic pistol (unused)
- Deaths: 3 (including the perpetrator)
- Injuries: 6
- Perpetrator: Natalie Lynn "Samantha" Rupnow
- Motive: Nihilistic violent extremism
- Accused: Jeffrey Rupnow
- Charges: 2 counts of supplying a dangerous weapon to a person under the age of 18; 1 count of contributing to the delinquency of a minor

On December 16, 2024, a school shooting occurred at Abundant Life Christian School in Madison, Wisconsin, United States. Two people were killed and six others were injured. The perpetrator, 15-year-old student Natalie Lynn "Samantha" Rupnow, killed herself at the scene. The shooting has inspired copycat attacks. (Note: Copycat attacks include: the Antioch High School shooting and the 2025 Evergreen High School shooting.)

== Background ==
Abundant Life Christian School is a private Christian K–12 school founded in 1978. The building is located next to the City Church Madison and shares a 28-acre (11 ha) campus with the Campus for Kids Learning Center, an infant to kindergarten center in addition to the church. Children from about 200 families are enrolled in the school, which had about 390 students enrolled at the time of the shooting. At the time of the shooting, the school had cameras installed; however, like most private schools of its size, it did not have a metal detector or a school resource officer.

== Shooting ==
The shooting occurred inside of a classroom used as a study hall. The Madison Police Department received a 911 call from a second-grade teacher inside the school at 10:57 a.m. CST. The shooting was in a mixed age and grade study hall. Rupnow was armed with two handguns during the shooting, but only used one of them. During the shooting, she wore a black T-shirt inscribed with a bullseye.

Law enforcement arrived at the school and found the shooter unresponsive at 11:05 a.m. from a self-inflicted gunshot wound. The suspect was initially reported as a teenage juvenile and a student of the school. The shooter was declared dead during transport to the hospital.

At 11:14 a.m., staff and students were evacuated from the school. A public safety alert was sent to nearby phones at around 11:20 a.m. After an initial sweep of the school, police officials reported none of the responding officers fired their weapons and there was no further threat to the public.

In total, 21 shell casings were recovered from the scene. During the attack, Rupnow carried two pistols, a 9mm Glock 19 Gen4 and a .22LR Sig Sauer P322; five 9mm magazines; three .22LR magazines; and a box containing 50 rounds of 9mm ammunition.

== Victims ==
During an initial news conference, officials from the Madison Police Department reported that the death toll was five people, but later amended their report and said that three people, including the suspected shooter, were dead. The two victims were identified by the Dane County Medical Examiner's Office as 42-year-old teacher Erin West of DeForest and 14-year-old student Rubi Vergara.

Six people were injured, two critically. Chief of Police Shon F. Barnes did not provide the ages and genders of the injured victims. Four patients from the shooting were treated at SSM Health St. Mary's Hospital in Madison, according to a spokesperson for the hospital. Two of the injured victims were later discharged. The other two patients remained hospitalized but were in stable condition.

== Perpetrator ==
Rupnow wearing a KMFDM T-shirt similar in style to one occasionally worn by Columbine shooter Eric Harris

Natalie Lynn "Samantha" Rupnow (November 7, 2009 – December 16, 2024), a 15-year-old female student at the school, was identified by a law enforcement official as the perpetrator. Rupnow lived in the Madison metropolitan area for the entirety of her life, with family ties in both Friesland and Randolph, Wisconsin. Her parents were both divorced and re-married twice. She had been enrolled in therapy by July 2022, which was supposed to help guide decisions about with which parent she would spend weekends. Before this therapy, Rupnow had threatened to kill herself and had engaged in self-cutting until her father "had to lock up all the knives in his house." One of her friends told police that Rupnow had referred to her father as a "drinker" and that he frequently verbally abused his daughter.

In June 2022, when Rupnow was 12, she began contact with a 22-year-old man from Illinois, who claimed he was 17. Following multiple lewd messages from the man, he arranged to meet Rupnow, which he did on at least one occasion. This man's relationship with Rupnow was eventually discovered, and police charged him with child enticement.

Months prior to the shooting in August, Rupnow joined a gun club when her father took her to a shooting range. He wrote in a Facebook comment that they had joined the club that spring and had been "loving every second of it". Rupnow's father told police that her interest in firearms had "snowballed" and that he had informed her of the combination to his gun safe where he kept her firearms. Ten days prior to the shooting, he texted a friend, saying that his daughter would shoot him if he opened the gun safe.

A user posted on X what was alleged to be the shooter's manifesto. At the time of publication, the manifesto had not yet been authenticated by Madison police. In a document entitled War Against Humanity that investigators discovered at Rupnow's house, she described humanity as "filth" and wrote about how she admired school shooters, including Pekka-Eric Auvinen. She also discussed her mother's absence and how she had obtained firearms by "lies and manipulation, and my fathers [sic] stupidity". Rupnow's alleged social media accounts contained expressions of alienation.

On Telegram, she had been invited to a group chat in which the perpetrator of the 2024 Eskişehir mosque stabbing had posted his manifesto shortly before committing his attack. According to the Anti-Defamation League, Rupnow was found to possibly have a TikTok account with white supremacist memes and a bio that used the phrase "Totally nice day", which is sometimes used as a racist dog whistle by white supremacists as a code for "TND" (which stands in turn for "Total Nigger Death"). A photo emerged of her wearing a KMFDM T-shirt similar to the shirt that Eric Harris, one of the perpetrators of the 1999 Columbine High School massacre, wore in various amateur videos. According to the Institute for Strategic Dialogue, their research on Rupnow indicated that she "was primarily motivated by her [membership in the] TCC (True Crime Community) fandom"; they described her as a nihilistic violent extremist.

== Aftermath ==
The Boys and Girls Clubs of Dane County hosted a candlelight vigil the day after the shooting at the state capitol grounds. A memorial was set up on a sidewalk near the school to honor the victims of the shooting. Former students among others brought offerings such as poinsettia plants to the memorial. On December 18, an obituary for Vergara was published online by a local funeral home. Her funeral service was held on December 21 at City Church in Madison. On August 1, 2025, Rupnow's mother, Mellissa Rupnow, was found dead from an apparent suicide.

== Investigation ==
The Bureau of Alcohol, Tobacco, Firearms and Explosives (ATF) was at the scene following the shooting. A spokesperson said the Bureau recovered the 9mm caliber handgun used in the shooting and was running a trace on it. Police and the Federal Bureau of Investigation (FBI) spoke to the perpetrator's family and students to attempt to find a motive. The perpetrator's family cooperated with law enforcement throughout the investigation.

Chief Barnes said he was aware that the alleged manifesto, claimed to be from the shooter, was circulating on the internet, but he could not confirm its authenticity. He also said that he had requested that the ATF expedite their investigation into the shooter's whereabouts and method of obtaining the firearm. He was unsure whether her parents owned or had possession of the weapon. On December 17, Barnes told news reporters that investigators were looking into a "combination of factors," including the possibility that Rupnow had been bullied.

The shooter's father's home was searched by law enforcement on December 17, in order to gather computers and other personal devices that would be used to identify the shooter's digital footprint. The shooter's mother's home was also visited by police on December 17, but according to neighbors and eyewitnesses, it appeared nobody was home. Neighbors said they had little contact with the shooter's mother. Police searched the shooter's social media accounts for hints that could help them establish a motive behind the attack.

While searching Rupnow's home, officers found a cardboard model of the school, maps, and a schedule of the attack, beginning with her opening fire at 11:30 a.m., "wiping out" the first and second floors of the school, and then ending the attack at 12:10 p.m. with the note "ready 4 Death."

On May 8, 2025, Rupnow's father, Jeffrey Rupnow, was charged with two counts of intentionally giving, selling, or loaning a dangerous weapon to a person under the age of 18 and one count of contributing to the delinquency of a minor, in connection to how Rupnow obtained the weapons used in the shooting. All three charges were felonies. Bond was set at $20,000 on May 9.

=== Potential conspirators and copycats ===
On December 18, 20-year-old Alexander Paffendorf from Carlsbad, California, was detained by FBI agents in connection with the shooting. He was suspected of coordinating a mass shooting at a government building in conjunction with Rupnow. Allegedly, he told Rupnow that he "would arm himself with explosives and a gun and that he would start shooting in a government building." The FBI declined to comment on how Paffendorf and Rupnow knew each other.

As a result of Paffendorf’s statements and admissions, a gun violence emergency protective (restraining) order approved by a San Diego County judge was served on him. The order requires him to turn over firearms and not to possess any guns while the order is in effect. On January 3, 2025, Paffendorf appeared via video in the San Diego County Superior Court for a restraining order hearing. He apologized for his connection to the shooting, expressed regret for his actions, and said he was willing to face the repercussions of his actions. The judge postponed the hearing until April 4 because Paffendorf was under criminal investigation and did not yet have an attorney. On April 28, a three-year restraining order was granted.

Rupnow followed the X account of 17-year-old student Solomon Henderson, who went on to open fire at Antioch High School in Nashville, Tennessee, on January 22, 2025, killing one student and injuring another before committing suicide.

On April 29, 2025, 22-year-old Damien Allen from Loxahatchee, Florida, was arrested by police for plotting seven separate mass shootings at seven different locations, including at least one police station and a church. He was found to have exchanged messages with Rupnow prior to her death. Allen was also found to be in possession of 18 firearms and over 12,000 rounds of ammunition.

On June 10, 2025, 21-year-old Arthur A, killed 10 people and injured 11 others at Dreierschützengasse secondary school in Graz Austria before dying of a self-inflicted gunshot wound. He had followed Rupnow's Spotify account.

On August 27, 2025, 23-year-old Robin Westman carried out a mass shooting at the Church of the Annunciation in Minneapolis, Minnesota, killing two children and injuring 30 other people before committing suicide. She had written Rupnow's last name on the gun used in the shooting.

On September 10, 2025, 16-year-old student Desmond Holly opened fire at Evergreen High School, injuring two students before committing suicide. He idolized Rupnow online and took a photo of himself imitating her before the shooting.

On 7 November 2025, a 17-year-old boy detonated a series of bombs at State High School 72 of Jakarta, injuring 96 people. According to a police counterterrorism spokesperson, the perpetrator had been inspired by school shooters including Rupnow.

In November 2025, a 15-year-old boy was detained in Kenosha, Wisconsin, after he made a threat on TikTok against a local school, timed to occur on the same date as the ALCS shooting.

== Reactions ==
President Joe Biden condemned the incident as "shocking and unconscionable" in a statement. He called on Congress to take immediate action to address gun violence, emphasizing the need for stronger protections for children in schools. He advocated for Congress to pass gun safety laws including universal background checks, a national red flag law in addition to a ban on assault weapons and high-capacity magazines.

Wisconsin governor Tony Evers ordered the United States and Wisconsin flags to be flown at half-staff and released a statement on X shortly after the shooting tweeting that he was closely monitoring the shooting and the community, and was praying for the students, educators, and community as they await more information.

Wisconsin senators Tammy Baldwin and Ron Johnson posted separate statements on social media offering their condolences and prayers to all the victims, and said they would continue to monitor the situation and assist law enforcement as needed. Shortly after the shooting, the school's Facebook page posted that they had had an active shooter incident and are asking for prayers.

Chief Barnes told the media, "Every child, every person in that building, is a victim and will be a victim forever. These types of trauma don't just go away." At the vigil, Madison Metropolitan School District superintendent Joe Gothard said that the tragedy occurred less than two blocks from his childhood home. He claimed saying that the district would improve safety was insufficient. He said, "We need to connect like we are tonight, each and every day and make a commitment that we know we're there for one another, hopefully to avoid preventable tragedies like yesterday."

== See also ==
- Columbine effect
- List of school shootings in the United States by death toll
- List of mass shootings in the United States in 2024
- List of school shootings in the United States (2000–present)
