= 2025 Antioch High School shooting =

School shooting in Tennessee, U.S.

Antioch High School shooting
- Location: 36°02′49″N 86°35′55″W; Nashville, Tennessee, U.S.
- Date: January 22, 2025; 21 months ago 11:09 a.m. (CST; UTC−06:00)
- Target: Students at Antioch High School
- Attack type: School shooting; murder–suicide
- Weapon: 9mm Taurus G2C semi-automatic pistol
- Deaths: 2 (including the perpetrator)
- Injuries: 2 (1 by gunfire)
- Perpetrator: Solomon Henderson
- Motive: Notoriety; Obsession with mass shootings and violence; Extremist ideologies such as neo-Nazism and white supremacy; Loneliness and incel subculture

On January 22, 2025, a school shooting occurred at Antioch High School in the Antioch neighborhood of Nashville, Tennessee, United States. 17-year-old Solomon Henderson opened fire inside the school's cafeteria, killing one student and injuring another before he killed himself.

== Background ==
Antioch High School is a public high school located in Antioch, Tennessee, a neighborhood of Nashville. At the time of the shooting, it had over 2,100 students enrolled in grades 9–12 and is one of 19 high schools administered by Metropolitan Nashville Public Schools.

== Shooting ==
Prior to the shooting, Henderson went into a school restroom and is believed to have retrieved a weapon there. The handgun was a 9mm Taurus G2C semi-automatic pistol. The shooting began at 11:09 a.m. when Henderson confronted 16-year-old female student Josselin Corea Escalante in the cafeteria and killed her with his handgun.

Henderson fired several more shots, then proceeded to shoot himself in the head with the same handgun. Two injuries occurred; one caused by being grazed by a bullet, and another facial injury following a fall. Both of the injured were students. Ten shots in total were fired during the shooting within 17 seconds. Two magazines were recovered, the one inserted having nine 9mm rounds inside and the other having seven. The shooting was livestreamed in part on the service Kick.

The gun used in the shooting was obtained legally in Arizona in 2022 and had never been reported as stolen. Two school resource officers were in the school building but were not in the cafeteria at the time of the shooting. The school did not have metal detectors.

== Perpetrator ==
A yearbook photo of Henderson

Solomon Sahmad Charlie Henderson (March 23, 2007 – January 22, 2025) was identified as the perpetrator. The Metropolitan Nashville Police Department was investigating writings and social media posts connected to Henderson. In the writings, Henderson praised various mass killers, including the perpetrators of the Christchurch mosque shootings and 2022 Bratislava shooting, and shared his own antisemitic and racist views. The author of a 288-page diary attributed to Henderson expressed a desire to kill people and a fear of being caught by authorities.

A separate 51-page document expressed white supremacist and neo-Nazi beliefs, including hatred towards minority groups. Henderson, who was African-American, described himself as a black man who was angry at members of his own race. Henderson was admittedly a frequent user of the imageboard soyjak.party, and his manifesto contained memes and jargon originating from that imageboard.

He was also active on a forum dedicated to sharing depictions of graphic violence. According to the Anti-Defamation League, Henderson was self-described as a "mentalcel", defined as "someone who identifies as an involuntary celibate (incel) on the basis of an intellectual or learning disability". He also appeared "to have been versed in the subculture of Com". PBS Wisconsin stated that the online networks Henderson was a part of shared a range of influences, ideologies and aesthetics related to white supremacy, antisemitism, racism, neo-Nazism, occultism or satanist beliefs, "To varying degrees of commitment and sincerity". He lifted portions of his manifesto from the Christchurch Mosque shooter's manifesto and from propaganda by Terrorgram.

As details of the shooting emerged, researchers realized they had previously encountered some of Henderson's posts and accounts within the network of roughly 100 users they were monitoring. They had already reported one of Henderson's usernames, along with others in the network, to law enforcement and submitted multiple reports to the National Center for Missing & Exploited Children. Police investigators discovered evidence that Henderson and the perpetrator of the Abundant Life Christian School shooting, Natalie "Samantha" Rupnow, were following each other on social media but did not coordinate in planning their respective attacks.

Henderson was described as quiet by classmates. Nonetheless, he had been suspended for two days after bringing a box cutter to school and threatening another student on October 25, 2024. He was scheduled to appear in juvenile court due to the incident, but the family of the threatened student decided not to press charges against Henderson. Instead, he was granted judicial diversion on January 8, 2025, two weeks before the shooting. Records from Henderson's time as a student at nearby John F. Kennedy Middle School stated that Henderson reportedly told something "troubling" to a teacher, and staff had found something described as "concerning" on his school laptop. The nature of these incidents is confidential since Henderson was only 14 at the time.

Police had been called to the Henderson residence at least four times prior to the shooting. The first emergency call was made in 2020 by Henderson's mother. She claimed that Henderson had run away from home, after allegedly punching his mother in the face and trying to throw a chair at her. He was later found and arrested in Clarksville, Tennessee. Henderson's motive for fleeing his home remains unknown. Another visit occurred in October 2023 after Nashville police department received a theft report.

A search of the home resulted in zero arrests, however two firearms were confiscated. Henderson wrote in his online diary on January 10, 2025, "I had my house raided once they found a gun it was mine LOL. My dad took the blame." The final call was made by a member of the Henderson household in December 2024; police did not visit the dwelling itself. No further information has been provided surrounding this call.

A fifth incident involving Henderson and law enforcement came to light after the release of Henderson's juvenile criminal record in May 2025. Child sexual abuse material was found on Henderson's electronic devices on November 6, 2023 with police claiming Henderson downloaded the material from the internet. Henderson was arrested but released to his parents the next day, under the condition that he could only use the internet for schoolwork. Related charges were dropped on April 10, 2024, after Henderson began treatment at a mental health facility. The records show that Henderson was in court the morning of the shooting in relation to his October 2024 suspension. This court hearing declared that Henderson would be legally unable to purchase firearms or ammunition. Henderson's mother then dropped Henderson off at Antioch High School shortly thereafter.

=== Preparation ===
Henderson's virtual diary made public following the shooting suggest Henderson envisioned that the shooting would occur on a far larger scale than what actually occurred. On December 12, 2024, he would share a photo in which nails and Vaseline he had purchased were visible, claiming he planned to construct an improvised explosive device with them. A few days later on January 1, 2025, Henderson debated on carrying out the attack while he is still seventeen or waiting until his eighteenth birthday in order "to get better equipment like gopro [sic] and better guns." This correlates with Henderson's self stated goal of murdering ten or more students at the High School.

However, by January 2025, Henderson seemed to have altered his plans out of paranoia of being arrested before he was able to carry out the attack. On January 16, 2025, Henderson wrote "The shooting will happen next Thursday. (Note: Despite Henderson's claim, the attack actually took place on a Wednesday rather than a Thursday.) This is a complete failure and not the original plan I had. Due my incompetent [sic], the law and family issues."

== Aftermath and response ==
Parents were initially sent to a local hospital to reunite with their children. They were later taken to a designated reunification center. Metropolitan Nashville Public Schools has given a phone number for parents to call about the shooting. Meanwhile, the footage of the shooting was removed from Kick, and the user who streamed it was banned from the service.

Governor Bill Lee released a statement condemning the incident. Other state officials and members of the Nashville Public School Board released their own statements regarding the incident. The White House also released a report saying that President Donald Trump was following the situation and offered his thoughts and prayers.

=== Arrest of mother ===
On January 21, 2026, almost one year following the shooting, Henderson's mother was made the center of a nationwide extradition for unlawful gun possession by a convicted felon. A warrant was issued after traces of Thomas' DNA were discovered on the firearm used in the shooting. Authorities stated that Henderson's parents had moved out of their home in Antioch shortly after the shooting, but were unaware as to where. She was eventually discovered in Las Vegas on January 28, 2026, and was arrested without incident.

== See also ==
- 2025 Evergreen High School shooting
- List of school shootings in the United States by death toll
- List of school shootings in the United States (2020s)
