= Louisiana Culinary Institute =

Coordinates: 30°24′37″N 91°3′58″W

Louisiana Culinary Institute, LLC
- Type: For-profit college junior culinary college
- Established: 2003
- Administrative staff: 14
- Undergraduates: 686
- Postgraduates: N/A
- Location: Baton Rouge, Louisiana, United States
- Campus: Urban
- Website: www.LCI.edu

The Louisiana Culinary Institute is a for-profit junior culinary college in Baton Rouge, Louisiana. It offers Associate degrees in Culinary Arts and Hospitality and Culinary Management. In 2013, The Cooking Channel hosted a series of "The Freshman Class" program, at the institute, which followed four freshman through their studies.
