= True Crime Community =

Online crime fandom

The True Crime Community (TCC) is an online fandom and subculture with an obsessive interest in true crime, particularly serial killers and high-profile mass murderers. The TCC comprises individuals who engage with true crime podcasts, articles, web forums, and social media. It has a large presence across social media platforms, including TikTok, Reddit, Twitter and Tumblr. The term encompasses consumers of mainstream true crime content, as well as a more obscure extremist fringe.

Several members of the TCC have gone on to commit their own crimes inspired by previous acts of violence, especially in the aftermath of the 2024 Abundant Life Christian School shooting. It has been linked to nihilistic violent extremism, participatory memetic violence, and hybristophilia.

== Background ==
=== "Columbiners" ===
The TCC developed in part from online communities surrounding the perpetrators of the 1999 Columbine High School massacre, including the "Columbiner" fandom. The fandom emerged on early online message boards in the late 1990s and early 2000s and expanded alongside the growth of social media. Columbiners influenced other online communities centered on perpetrators of mass shootings. The TCC emerged more broadly in the late 2010s as social media use and engagement among young people increased. There is also a connection to online gore communities, as videos of graphic violence are often circulated in the TCC. Adam Lanza, the perpetrator of the 2012 Sandy Hook Elementary School shooting, participated in online communities associated with the TCC on Tumblr. He shared images of mass shooting victims and footage of school shooters through his Tumblr blogs, "gayfortimk" and "queerforkimveer", whose names referenced school shooters Tim Kretschmer and Kimveer Gill.

== History ==
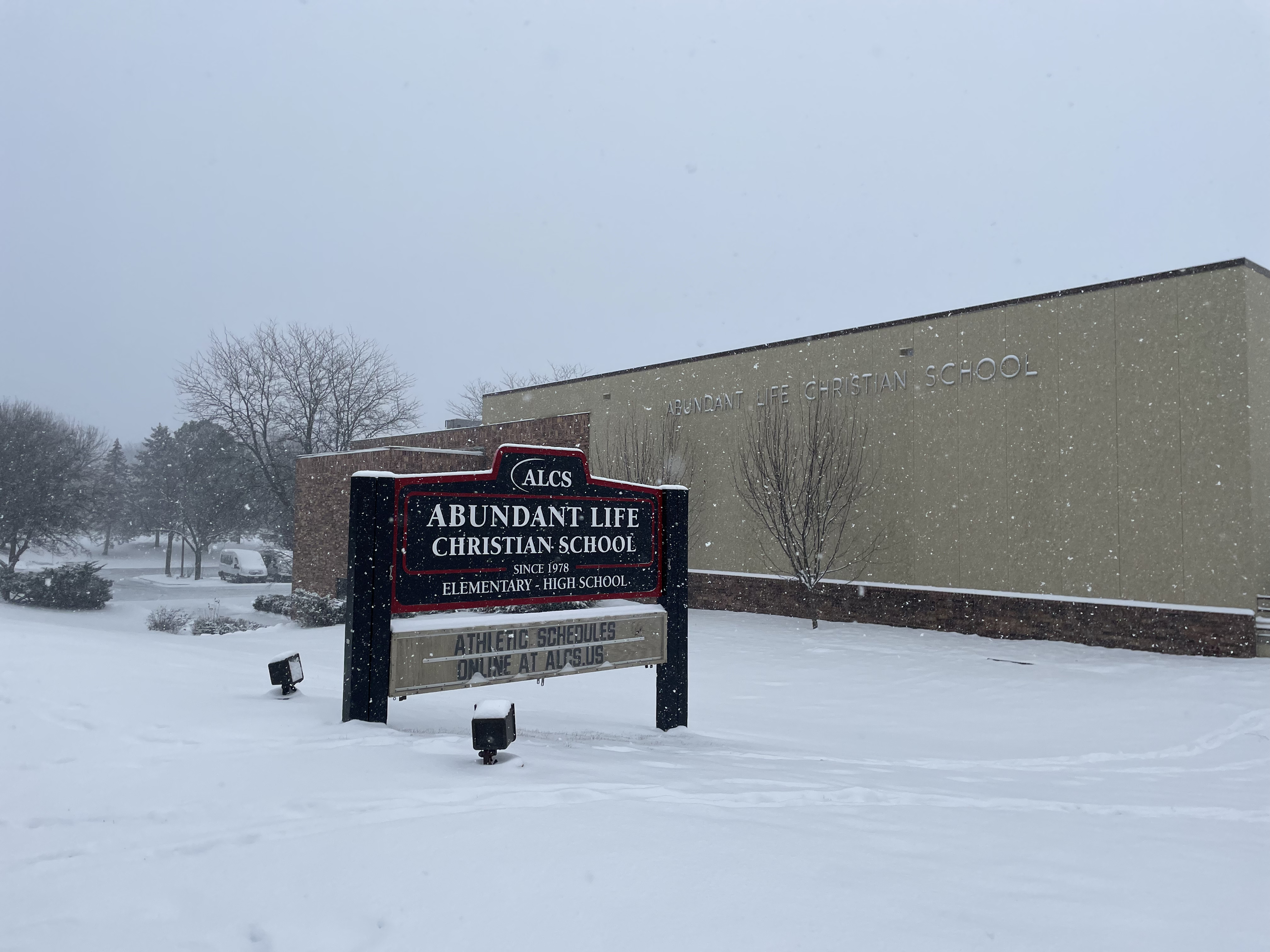
The Abundant Life Christian School was the site of a notorious; TCC-linked shooting.

=== Connection to real-world violence ===
Although mass-casualty attacks are more common in the United States, the TCC is an international phenomenon. TCC members have been linked to attacks and threats in countries including Austria, Mexico, Australia, Romania and Russia. Analysts have identified copycat pattern within the community, in which mass-casualty attacks can generate increased activity, particularly when perpetrators have participated in TCC spaces. The notoriety gained by attackers can encourage other members to imitate them or seek recognition within the community.

This pattern was particularly notable following the 2024 Abundant Life Christian School shooting in Wisconsin, after which the perpetrator, 15-year-old Natalie Rupnow, became notorious in TCC communities. Her prominence was further amplified when the perpetrator of the 2025 Antioch High School shooting, described as an online associate of Rupnow, referenced her before the attack, and the perpetrator of the 2025 Annunciation Catholic Church shooting wrote her name on his rifle. According to research by the Institute for Strategic Dialogue (ISD), at least four school shooters and five plots in 2024 were linked to TCC online communities. ISD further reported that the four attacks resulted in eight deaths, excluding the perpetrators, exceeding the number of fatalities attributed to ideologically motivated extremist violence in the United States during 2024.

In the aftermath of the April 2026 Teotihuacan shooting in Mexico, Milenio and El Universal, speculated about the perpetrator's ties to the TCC. In June 2026, the Institute for Strategic Dialogue found that the two perpetrators of a shooting in the previous month at the Islamic Center of San Diego, though primarily motivated by neo-Nazi accelerationism and white supremacy, had online engagement with and a broader influence from nihilistic extremist online subcultures such as the TCC.

=== Causation and ideology ===
The TCC has been described by researchers as an online subculture associated with nihilistic violent extremism and participatory memetic violence, rather than a coherent political ideology. TCC-linked attacks are generally not intended to achieve political objectives. Researchers have identified motivations including personal grievances, identity issues, mental health struggles, and a desire for recognition within the TCC community. Perpetrators of such attacks have left manifestos, social media posts, or other online material expressing admiration for previous mass shooters, alongside feelings of alienation, hopelessness, misanthropy, or dissatisfaction with their lives, society, or the future.

The Swedish Police Authority reported that many of the underage suspects of TCC-related crimes come from difficult home situations, have been subjected to bullying or have had difficulty at school.

== Content and games ==
=== Use of generative AI and "rampage dance" trend ===
Members of the TCC, on social media platforms such as TikTok and Instagram, create AI-generated videos in which notorious terrorists and mass murderers are depicted dancing against the backdrop of the sites where they carried out their attacks, with references to their victims usually expressed as the number of people killed. Such videos are apart of the "rampage dance" trend.

Carbine (named after the type of firearm), a game on Roblox created by Active Shooter Studios, allows users to recreate the Columbine High School massacre and play the role of the perpetrators Eric Harris and Dylan Klebold.

=== Recreations of real-world violence in video games ===
Members of the TCC have used games such as Minecraft and Roblox to recreate locations and events associated with real-world violence. Recreations of real-world mass casualty attacks on the gaming platform Roblox have been documented as a recurring phenomenon within the TCC. Groups affiliated with the TCC, sometimes styling themselves as "game studios," develop and circulate in-game maps that simulate events such as the 1999 Columbine High School massacre, the 2022 Uvalde school shooting, and the 2018 Parkland high school shooting, among others.

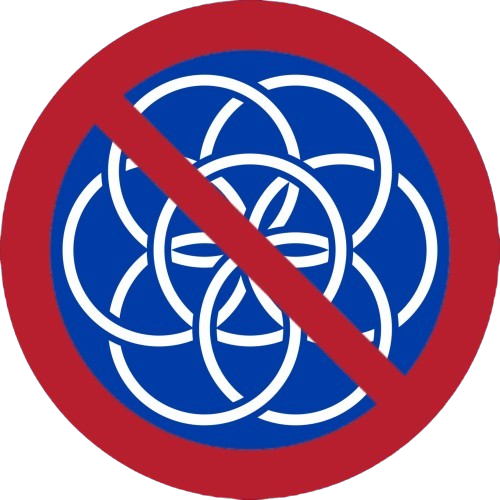
One of the symbols used by members of the TCC, as described by British researcher Joseph Ondrak.

=== Symbolism ===
According to the Anti-Defamation League, members of the TCC use symbols such as the military helmet emoji and usernames inspired by previous attackers to identify each other. According to British researcher Joseph Ondrak, another symbol used by members of the TCC features the International Flag of Planet Earth with a no symbol superimposed across it. It was notably found on the 2026 Fagersta school attack suspect's social media account.

== Censorship ==
Beginning in January 2026, keywords and phrases associated with the community were being blocked and related material was being removed on Tumblr; the content on Tumblr included fan art and fictional stories. In response, community members adopted alternative signifiers, including emojis, altered spellings, and coded language, to continue producing content despite increased moderation. The increased moderation of TCC-related content on Tumblr has resulted in TCC-related content becoming prevalent on TikTok.

== See also ==
- Columbine effect – Legacy of the 1999 Columbine massacre
- Terrorgram – Network of neo-fascist Telegram channels
