= The Com =

Transnational cybercriminal network

- Named after: Shorthand for "the community"
- Activities: Cybercrime, sextortion, swatting, physical assault

The Com, also known as The Community, is an online transnational crime network made up of multiple cybercriminal and terrorist networks. The network is credited with various crimes, including cryptocurrency theft, violence incitement and swatting. The Com is responsible for data breaches of multiple organizations. The Federal Bureau of Investigation (FBI) and Europol affirm that The Com utilizes tactics including SIM swapping, IP grabbing, swatting and social engineering. The network maintains extreme ideological views and is known to sexually groom and extort children.

The Com recruits new members, primarily children, using social media and gaming sites. The Com is the parent organization of 764, a neo-Nazi child exploitation network. Members of the network have been charged for serious crimes, including kidnappings and acts of torture. The FBI warned the public of The Com on July 23, 2025, and said that their crimes are motivated by financial gain, revenge, sexual gratification, attention, and ideology.

== Characteristics and crimes ==
The Com is a hidden, transnational social network for current and future cybercriminals. After the value of Bitcoin surged twelve-fold in 2017, membership of the network increased dramatically.

The Com acts like an online network of violent and extremist groups as for example 764, No Lives Matter, Maniacs Murder Cult and Satanic Front who chat with each other using various messaging apps.

The recruiting process usually starts with The Com members starting a relationship with the victim, sending them kind and romantic messages. Once the victim trusts the member, they gradually start to coerce the victim to share private information. After the victim shares the material, The Com starts to blackmail them into sending violent material, for example videos of the victim hurting strangers, their family, or themselves. The Com mostly uses Discord, Telegram, Roblox, Minecraft, Twitch and Steam to recruit victims. According to the RCMP, victims have been forced to cut their wrists, harm their pets, take photos of themselves placing notes on dead animals or on their wounds, and write on walls using their own blood. Victims are coerced into committing harmful acts through threats of swatting, doxxing, and bodily harm.

The Institute for Strategic Dialogue attributes nihilistic violent extremism to The Com.

=== Branches ===
The Com is split into multiple branches. Members of the branches usually have shared interests, ideologies or other reasons to work together in order to achieve their goals. The first branch, known as "Hacker Com" (formerly "Cyber Com") is responsible for committing cybercrimes like swatting, data theft and creating ransomware. "Sextortion Com" is responsible for recruiting new members to The Com by using sextortion and collecting personal information of contactees with the intention to dox them. Members of this branch mainly indoctrinate underage people to commit self-harm, send sexual images of themselves, spread gore videos, and child pornography in the name of The Com.

The third branch, known as "Offline Com" or "IRL Com", has been held responsible for crimes ranging from vandalism to arson, unprovoked attacks on strangers, stabbings, and other acts of terrorism worldwide. Members of Offline Com include satanic, national socialist and accelerationist groups, as well as true crime enthusiasts and followers of school shooters. 764 is the biggest and most influential group within Offline Com, responsible for a majority of the crimes.

A fourth branch, known as "Anti-Extortion" or "AE", created by a user under the pseudonym “Bear”, claims to oppose extortion. They primarily operate across digital platforms and messaging applications, most notably Discord and Telegram, as well as gaming environments like Roblox. While the group publicly states its mission is to target, expose, and eliminate internet extortionists and child exploitation networks, they actively engage in predatory cyber-bullying and severe cybercrime under the guise of online justice. Their activities include orchestrating doxxing campaigns to leak private information, launching coordinated swatting attacks to send armed police to victims' homes, and deploying financial extortion or blackmail against rival digital factions and vulnerable individuals.

The Com is connected to a group of skinheads active in Russia and Ukraine responsible for random attacks on people and acts of murder. Also ShinyHunters, an extortionist criminal group, is likely a part of The Com.

== Crimes ==
According to the National Crime Agency, the number of crimes committed by The Com increased by a factor of four between 2022 and 2024. The FBI reported in July 2025 that members of The Com use sophisticated methods to hide their identity online while committing money laundering and making transactions. They said that The Com intentionally hires underage Americans because they are punished more leniently by the criminal justice system.

Edward Coristine, a high-ranking employee of the DOGE, US government organization, was allegedly a former member of The Com.

=== Notable activities ===
Riley Williams, a female member of The Com, is a well-known participant of the January 6 US Capitol attack in 2021. She was responsible for stealing Nancy Pelosi's laptop with the intention to sell it to Russia's Foreign Intelligence Service. She bragged about the crime in an affiliated Discord server and admitted of stealing other items. Williams was later arrested and sentenced to three years in prison. She was released early as a result of Donald Trump's blanket pardon of attack participants.

In 2022, the Com conducted cyber attacks against several high-profile organizations, namely HubSpot, Activision, Okta Inc, Doordash, Cloudflare, and Twilio. In 2023, The Com announced their affiliation with hacker groups BlackCat and ALPHV. The Com then proceeded to attack Reddit, MailChimp, Caesars Entertainment, CoinBase, Clorox, Riot Games, and MGM. MGM said that the attack cost them approximately $100 million.

== History of investigations and arrests ==
The Com was investigated by Allison Nixon in 2011, chief research officer of the cybersecurity organization Unit 221B. According to her, members of The Com were mostly interested in financial crimes until the 2020s, when they became interested in other crimes related to violent acts, misogyny and sextortion of children. Nixon said that The Com's crimes are widespread in US, with every state reporting and investigating the network's crimes. She added that sometimes, the police treat these crimes as terrorism, resulting in more speedy investigations and arrests. Cybersecurity firm Unit 221B itself later investigated The Com and found that the number of members responsible for violent crimes was in the hundreds or few thousands.

In 2021 law enforcement agencies of the US, UK, Germany, Romania, and Brazil launched investigations on about a dozen individuals linked to The Com. In the US, several people were federally charged. In September 2023, the FBI issued warnings about the network as part of their investigation into 764. In July and October 2024, multiple suspects affiliated with The Com committed six assaults on random bystanders in Hässelby, Sweden. On January 30, 2025, police in the US arrested two people, aged 23 and 41, as part of a joint Interpol–Europol crackdown on The Com. The men were members of CVLT, a violent neo-Nazi affiliate of The Com that coerced 16 minors into sending porn of themselves and committing self-harm. In February 2025, a 21-year-old British man and Com member was arrested for blackmailing underage girls and was convicted of fraud and making indecent images of children.

In July 2025, the FBI issued warnings about the network again, specifically its two branches: Hacker Com and IRL Com. The FBI urged parents and guardians to be more vigilant. At the end of July 2025, a 20-year-old from Minnesota who was a member of The Com affiliate "SR1" was arrested after having allegedly stabbed a woman 20 times in a park. In August 2025, it was reported that children on Roblox were being lured into joining a cult called Spawnism, which is based around an in-game symbol. Victims were reported as carving the symbol into their skin in the belief that it would allow them to respawn after death, like a video game character. The Spawnism cult is believed to be operated by Com groups. Roblox spokesperson Juliet Chaitin-Lefcourt said Roblox are aware of The Com's activities and working to ban them.

In June and July of 2026, Europol flagged 4,340 websites linked to The Com for removal. Several countries took part in the operation.
