= Domestic terrorism in the United States =

Incidents of American terrorism

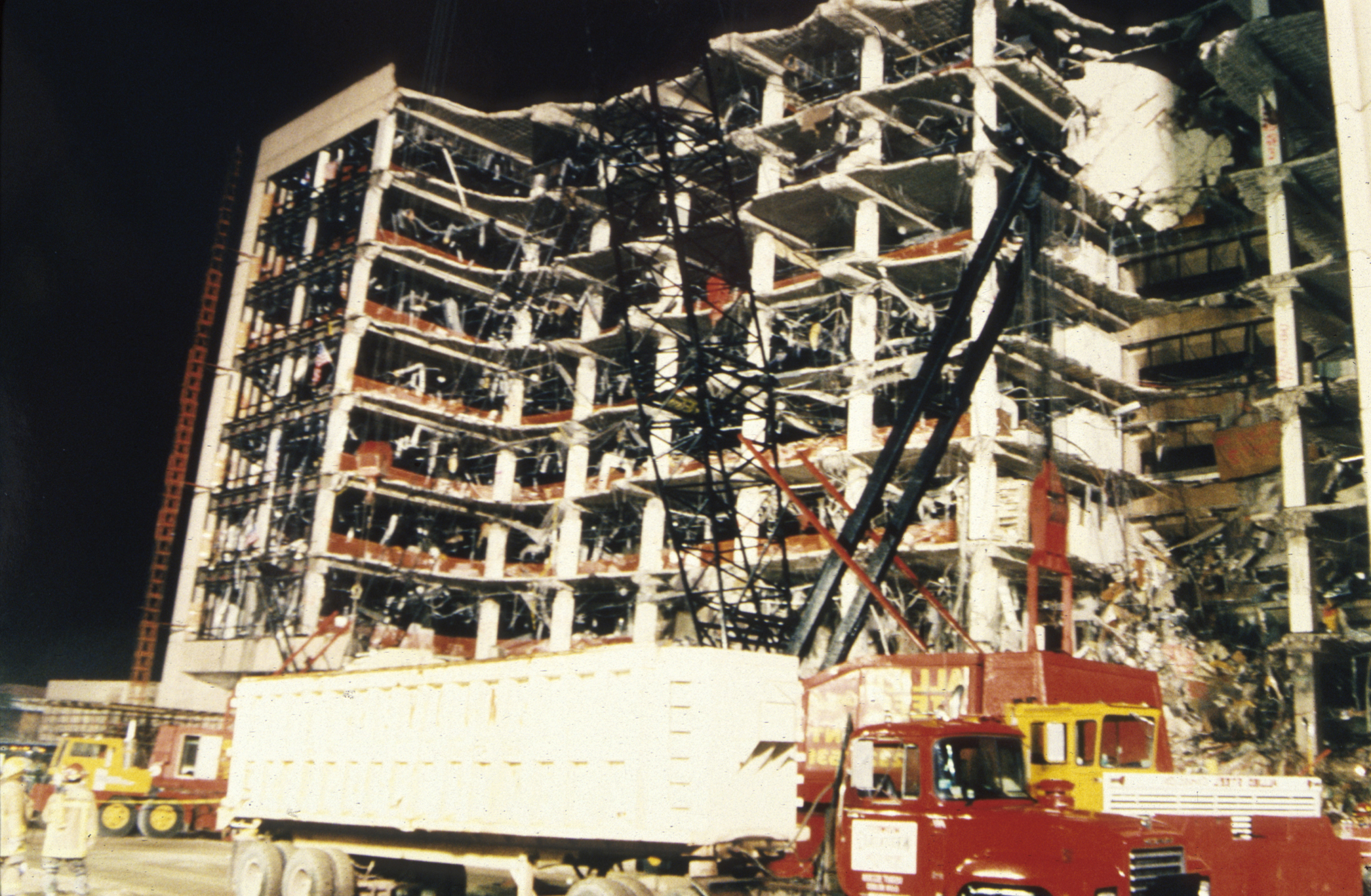
The aftermath of the Oklahoma City bombing, which killed 168 people. It was the deadliest domestic terrorist attack in U.S. history.

In the United States, domestic terrorism is defined as terrorist acts that were carried out within the United States by U.S. citizens or U.S. permanent residents. As of 2024, the United States government considers white supremacists to be the top domestic terrorism threat.

== Definition ==
The Federal Bureau of Investigation (FBI) defines domestic terrorism as violent, criminal acts which are committed by individuals or groups in order to further ideological goals stemming from domestic influences, such as those of a political, religious, social, racial, or environmental nature.

Under current United States law, outlined in the USA PATRIOT Act, acts of domestic terrorism are those which: "(A) involve acts dangerous to human life that are a violation of the criminal laws of the United States or of any State; (B) appear to be intended – (i) to intimidate or coerce a civilian population; (ii) to influence the policy of a government by intimidation or coercion; or (iii) to affect the conduct of a government by mass destruction, assassination, or kidnapping; and (C) occur primarily within the territorial jurisdiction of the United States."

While the PATRIOT Act defines "domestic terrorism" for the purposes of authorizing law enforcement investigations, no federal criminal offense exists which is referred to as "domestic terrorism". While international terrorism ("acts of terrorism transcending national boundaries") is a defined crime in federal law, acts of domestic terrorism are charged under specific laws, such as killing federal agents or "attempting to use explosives to destroy a building in interstate commerce".

Citizens suspected of terrorism are usually investigated and arrested by federal law enforcement, such as the FBI. For instance, from 2016 to 2018, the FBI arrested 355 suspects on charges related to domestic terrorism. Per the FBI, the vast majority were motivated by racist and anti-government ideology. Some state and local jurisdictions, including Washington, D.C. and New York do define terrorism as a crime, without regard as to whether the perpetrators are international in origin.

== Types ==
=== Anti-abortion violence ===
Anti-abortion extremists in the United States have committed violence against individuals and organizations that provide abortions or abortion counseling, acts that are considered terrorism. Incidents have included crimes against people, such as murder, assault, kidnapping, and stalking; crimes which affect both people and property, such as arson or bombings; and property crimes such as vandalism. Perpetrators of these incidents may defend their actions by stating that they are necessary to protect the lives of fetuses, and they are often motivated by their Christian beliefs, leading to anti-abortion violence's identification as Christian terrorism; it is also associated with antifeminism.

Notable incidents of anti-abortion violence include the murders of a number of doctors and clinic staff in the 1990s:

- In 1993, Michael F. Griffin shot Dr. David Gunn to death during a protest.
- In 1994, Paul Jennings Hill shot Dr. John Britton and clinic escort James Barrett to death, also wounding Barrett's wife June; John Salvi shot and killed two receptionists, Shannon Lowney and Lee Ann Nichols. Paul Hill would yell at the clinic "God hates murderers".
- Eric Robert Rudolph bombed the 1996 Olympic Games in Atlanta in protest of abortion, killing one person and wounding 111, and bombed several abortion clinics in 1997 and 1998, killing a security guard and critically injuring a nurse.
- In 1998, James Kopp shot a number of abortion providers, killing one, Dr. Barnett Slepian.
- In 2009, Scott Roeder shot and killed Dr. George Tiller. Tiller served as an usher at church; he had previously been a target in 1993, when he was shot by Shelley Shannon. The Army of God, an underground terrorist organization, has been responsible for a substantial amount of anti-abortion violence, including a number of the above murders.
- In 2015, Robert Lewis Dear, a 57-year-old Kentucky born, moved from South Carolina to North Carolina to Colorado where he opened fire on a Planned Parenthood facility, killing two civilians and a police officer. After a five-hour standoff Dear told the police "no more baby parts." Robert Lewis Dear has been found to be mentally incompetent to stand trial.

=== Eco-terrorism ===
According to the FBI in June 2008, eco-terrorists and extreme animal rights activists represented "one of the most serious domestic terrorism threats in the US" at the time. They had committed over 2,000 crimes and caused over $110 million in damages in the 28–29 years since 1979, against targets including lumber companies, animal testing facilities, and genetic research firms. No human casualties were reported.

=== Nihilistic violent extremism ===
Nihilistic violent extremism (NVE), or nihilistic extremism, is a term used by law enforcement agencies to refer to extremism and violence lacking an ideological motivation, instead motivated by a misanthropic worldview and generalized hatred for society. It is closely associated with groups such as 764 and No Lives Matter. Despite its characterization as being unmotivated by genuine ideology, groups or individuals falling under this umbrella may adopt the aesthetics of, or have sympathies for, other extremist ideologies like neo-Nazism, the variant of Satanism associated with the Order of Nine Angles, and accelerationism.

=== Racialized lynching terror ===
According to the Equal Justice Initiative, more than 4,400 African Americans were lynched from 1877 to 1940. Racialized lynchings were carried out as part of a widely supported racial domestic terrorist campaign to enforce racial subordination and segregation in the South and beyond between Reconstruction and World War II.

In July 2020, the FBI began investigating the alleged attempted lynching of Vauhxx Booker, a Bloomington Indiana civil rights activist and local official. Video of the incident showed five men pinning Booker down. Booker said the men had Confederate flags and threatened to lynch him. Two men were initially charged with assaulting Booker, while Booker was later charged with battery and trespassing in August 2021 over the same incident. The case was eventually resolved through restorative justice and all charges were dropped.

=== Right-wing extremist ===
Cumulatively over decades, most extremist killings in the U.S. have been caused by right-wing perpetrators. From 2022 through 2024, all 61 political killings were committed by right-wing extremists.

Homicides motivated by right-wing ideology have substantially outnumbered those perpetrated by left-wing perpetrators in the U.S. (Note: Far-right motivated homicides have also occurred much more frequently than jihadi violence inspired by Islamic extremism (not shown in chart).)

Right-wing terrorism or far-right terrorism is motivated by a variety of different right-wing and far-right ideologies, most prominently by neo-Nazism, neo-fascism, white nationalism, white separatism, ethnonationalism, religious nationalism, and anti-government patriot/sovereign citizen beliefs. A 2017 report by the U.S. Government Accountability Office found that of the 85 deadly extremist incidents since 9/11, far right-wing extremist groups were responsible for 73%, while radical Islamist extremists were responsible for 27%. The total number of deaths caused by each group was about the same, though 41% of the deaths attributable to radical Islamists occurred in a single event — the 2016 Orlando nightclub shooting in which 49 people were killed by a lone gunman. No deaths were attributed to left-wing groups.

A June 2020 study by the Center for Strategic and International Studies (CSIS) reported that over 25 years of domestic terrorism incidents, the majority of attacks and plots had come from far-right attackers. The trend had accelerated in recent years, with this sector responsible for about 66% of attacks and plots in 2019, and 90% of those in 2020. The next most potentially dangerous group was "religious extremists", the majority "Salafi jihadists inspired by the Islamic State and al-Qaida", while the number planned by the far left had reduced to a minute fraction since the mid-2000s.

The Domestic Terrorism Prevention Act has proposed legislation that would create offices within the Justice Department, the Department of Homeland Security, and the FBI to combat far-right violence. In September 2020, the bill (as H.R. 5602) passed the Democratic-majority House unanimously, but the Republican-majority Senate prevented a vote. Sen. Ron Johnson said the Justice Department had claimed the legislation might "impede" rather than enhance its ability to combat far-right violence. A Justice Department spokesperson alluded to "technical concerns" with the bill but did not elaborate.

The Department of Homeland Security reported in October 2020 that white supremacists posed the top domestic terrorism threat, which then-FBI director Christopher A. Wray confirmed in March 2021, noting the bureau had elevated the threat to the same level as ISIS. The DHS report did not mention antifa, despite persistent allegations about its threat from Donald Trump, William Barr, and other Trump administration officials and Republicans. A week after the assassination of Charlie Kirk in September 2025, the U.S. Department of Justice removed a 2024 study, titled "What NIJ Research Tells Us About Domestic Terrorism", which showed that white supremacist and far-right violence "continues to outpace all other types of terrorism and domestic violent extremism" in the United States, in contrast to statements made by the second Trump administration.

== Terrorist organizations ==
=== 764 and No Lives Matter ===
764 and No Lives Matter are two misanthropic accelerationist nihilistic violent extremist networks that are considered part of a terror network by the United States Department of Justice (DOJ), and considered a terrorist "tier one" investigative matter by the Federal Bureau of Investigation (FBI). 764 mainly operates online using sextortion against child victims while NLM is an offshoot with a greater focus on real-world violence. A number of murders and other violent incidents have been tied to both networks.

=== Alpha 66 and Omega 7 ===
Alpha 66 (still existent) and Omega 7 (now defunct) were two affiliated Cuban exile action groups which carried out many bombings and acts of sabotage. While many of these attacks have historically been directed at Cuba and the Castro government, many of them occurred domestically, especially during the period of Cuba-US diplomacy and negotiations in the 1970s which is known as "el Diálogo" (the dialogue) when powerful anti-Castro figures in Miami attempted to terrorize those members of their community who advocated a more moderate approach to Cuba. For instance, Luciano Nieves was killed because he advocated peaceful coexistence with Cuba. WQBA-AM news director Emilio Milian lost his legs in a car bomb after he publicly condemned Cuban exile violence. These cases of terrorism were extensively documented by Joan Didion in the book Miami. Human Rights Watch released a report in 1992 in which it claimed that the more extreme exiles have created a political environment in Miami where "moderation can be a dangerous position."

=== Animal Liberation Front ===
Animal Liberation Front (ALF) was labelled a serious domestic terrorist threat by the FBI in the early 2000s. ALF is a loosely organized animal rights extremist movement practicing direct action against companies and individuals to cause economic loss and destroy its victim. ALF campaigns have escalated and expanded to encompass harassment and crimes against employees and other companies with business relationships with the target company. In 2004, the deputy assistant director of the FBI testified before the Senate Judiciary Committee: "Individuals within the movement have discussed actively targeting food producers, biomedical researchers, and even law enforcement with physical harm. But even more disturbing is the recent employment of improvised explosive devices against consumer product testing companies, accompanied by threats of more, larger bombings and even potential assassinations of researchers, corporate officers and employees."

=== Army of God ===
Army of God (AOG) is a loose network of individuals and groups connected by ideological affinity and the determination to use force to end abortion in the United States. Acts of anti-abortion violence increased in the mid-1990s culminating in a series of bombings by Eric Robert Rudolph, whose targets included two abortion clinics, a gay and lesbian night club, and the 1996 Olympics in Atlanta. Letters sent to newspapers claim responsibility for the bombing of the abortion clinics in the name of the Army of God.

=== Aryan Nations ===
Aryan Nations (AN) is a white nationalist neo-Nazi organization founded in the 1970s by Richard Girnt Butler as an arm of the Christian Identity group known as the Church of Jesus Christ–Christian. As of December 2007, there were two main factions that claimed descent from Butler's group. The Aryan Nations has been called a "terrorist threat" by the FBI. The RAND Corporation has called it the "first truly nationwide terrorist network" in the United States.

=== Atomwaffen Division ===
Atomwaffen Division (AWD) or simply Atomwaffen is a neo-Nazi organization based in Florida that promotes former American Nazi Party and National Socialist Liberation Front (NSLF) member convict James Mason's Siege and "Universal Order" ideology as well as race war against minorities, Jews, and LGBT people. Atomwaffen also draws influence from Nazi esotericism and the occult. The group has about 80 full members and a "large" amount of initiates and 20 cells across 23 states in America. The organization also has a United Kingdom branch called the Sonnenkrieg Division (SKD), a Baltic branch called Feuerkrieg Division (FKD), a presence in Canada by a group called Northern Order and one located in Germany. The organization has been responsible for the deaths of eight people most notably the murder of Blaze Bernstein, a gay Jewish California student and the killings of Jeremy Himmelman and Andrew Oneschuk.

=== The Covenant, The Sword, and the Arm of the Lord ===
The Covenant, The Sword, and the Arm of the Lord (CSA) was a radical Christian Identity organization formed in 1971 in the small community of Elijah in southern Missouri, United States. One of its members, Richard Wayne Snell was responsible for the murder of a pawnshop owner and a Missouri state trooper. The CSA collapsed following an FBI and ATF siege in 1985.

=== Earth Liberation Front ===
Earth Liberation Front was labeled a serious domestic terrorist threat by the FBI in the early 2000s. Most notable for their arsons resulting in millions of dollars in damage, they have also vandalized and destroyed vehicles, construction and logging equipment, and buildings. For example, William Cottrell was indicted in 2004 for his role in a series of arsons and vandalisms to more than 120 SUVs in California, resulting in more than $2.5 million in damages. Michael James Scarpitti was convicted of a "series of arson and property destruction attacks in 2002 and 2003 against sport utility vehicles, fast food restaurants, construction vehicles, and construction sites" in Virginia. "Eight of the terrorist incidents that occurred in the United States in 2001 have been attributed to the Earth Liberation Front."

=== Jewish Defense League ===
Jewish Defense League (JDL) was founded in 1968 by Rabbi Meir Kahane in New York City. FBI statistics show that from 1980 to 1985, 15 terrorist attacks were attempted in the U.S. by JDL members. The FBI's Mary Doran described the JDL in 2004 Congressional testimony as "a proscribed terrorist group". The National Consortium for the Study of Terror and Responses to Terrorism states that during the JDL's first two decades of activity it was an "active terrorist organization." Kahane later founded the far right Israeli political party Kach.

=== Ku Klux Klan ===
The Ku Klux Klan (KKK) was determined to be a "terrorist organization" in 1870 by a federal grand jury, and the FBI has been investigating crimes by white supremacy extremists including Klan members since 1918. During reconstruction at the end of the Civil War the first KKK used domestic terrorism against the Northerners in the South ("called "Carpetbaggers") as well as against freed slaves. During the late 20th century, leading up to the Civil Rights Movement, various unrelated KKK groups used threats, violence, arson, and murder to further their anti-Black, anti-Catholic, anti-Communist, anti-immigrant, antisemitic, homophobic and white-supremacist agenda. Other groups with agendas similar to the Ku Klux Klan include neo-Nazis, white power skinheads, and other far-right movements.

=== May 19 Communist Organization ===
May 19 Communist Organization (variously referred to as the May 19 Communist Coalition, May 19 Communist, and various alternatives of M19CO), was a U.S.-based, self-described revolutionary organization formed by members of the Weather Underground Organization. The group was originally known as the New York chapter of the Prairie Fire Organizing Committee (PFOC), an organization devoted to legally promoting the causes of the Weather Underground. This was part of Prairie Fire Manifesto change in Weather Underground Organization strategy, which demanded both aboveground mass and clandestine organizations. The role of the clandestine organization would be to build the "consciousness of action" and prepare the way for the development of a people's militia. Concurrently, the role of the mass movement (i.e., above-ground Prairie Fire Collective) would include support for, and encouragement of, armed action. Such an alliance would, according to Weather, "help create the 'sea' for the guerrillas to swim in."

=== The Order ===
The Order, also known as the Brüder Schweigen or Silent Brotherhood, was a white nationalist revolutionary group active in the United States between 1983 and 1984. It is probably best known for the 1984 murder of radio talk show host Alan Berg. The group also carried out several bank and car robberies, three murders, and money counterfeiting until its leader, Robert Jay Mathews, was killed in a shootout with FBI agents on Whidbey Island, Washington, in December 1984.

=== Phineas Priesthood ===
Phineas Priesthood (Phineas Priests) is a Christian Identity movement that opposes interracial sex, the mixing of races, homosexuality, and abortion. It is also marked by antisemitism, anti-multiculturalism, and opposition to taxation. It is not considered an organization because it is not led by a governing body, there are no gatherings, and there is no membership process. One becomes a Phineas Priest by simply adopting the beliefs of the Priesthood and acting upon those beliefs. Members of the Priesthood are often called terrorists for, among other things, planning to blow up FBI buildings, abortion clinic bombings, and bank robberies.

=== Symbionese Liberation Army ===
Symbionese Liberation Army (SLA) was an American self-styled, far-left "urban guerrilla warfare group" that considered itself a revolutionary vanguard army. The group committed bank robberies, two murders, and other acts of violence between 1973 and 1975. Among their most notorious acts was the kidnapping of the newspaper heiress Patty Hearst.

=== United Freedom Front ===
United Freedom Front (UFF) was a small American Marxist organization active in the 1970s and 1980s. It was originally called the Sam Melville/Jonathan Jackson Unit, and its members became known as the Ohio 7 when they were brought to trial. Between 1975 and 1984 the UFF carried out at least 20 bombings and nine bank robberies in the northeastern United States, targeting corporate buildings, courthouses, and military facilities. Brent L. Smith describes them as "undoubtedly the most successful of the leftist terrorists of the 1970s and 1980s." The group's members were eventually apprehended and convicted of conspiracy, murder, attempted murder, and other charges. Jaan Laaman alone remains incarcerated today, following the death of Tom Manning in 2019.

=== Weather Underground ===
The Weather Underground Organization was a far left organization, active from 1969 to 1975, that originated as a faction of Students for a Democratic Society (SDS). Mostly composed of the national office leadership of SDS and their supporters, the group collapsed shortly after the U.S. withdrawal from Vietnam in 1975.

== Notable domestic terrorist attacks ==
=== San Francisco Coal Miners Massacre (1849) ===
The Hounds, a white vigilante group in San Francisco, attacked a Chilean mining community, raping women, burning houses, and lynching two men.

=== Pottawatomie Creek Massacre (1856) ===
Abolitionist John Brown with like-minded settlers killed five pro-slavery settlers north of Pottawatomie Creek in Franklin County, Kansas.

=== Mountain Meadows Massacre (1857) ===
The Mountain Meadows massacre was a series of attacks on the Baker–Fancher emigrant wagon train, at Mountain Meadows in southern Utah. The attacks began on September 7 and culminated on September 11, 1857, resulting in the mass slaughter of the emigrant party by members of the Utah Territorial Militia from the Iron County district, a Mormon group, together with some Paiute Native Americans. Intending to leave no witnesses and thus prevent reprisals, the perpetrators killed all the adults and older children – about 120 men, women, and children in total. Seventeen children, all younger than seven, were spared.

=== Harper's Ferry Massacre (1859) ===
Abolitionist John Brown leads a raid on Harper's Ferry arsenal to get weapons for arming slaves to resist slavery. Most of his men were killed, and he was tried for treason and hanged.

=== Lawrence Massacre (1863) ===
On August 21, 1863, the Confederate guerrilla group Quantrill's Raiders led by William Quantrill raided on the Unionist town of Lawrence, Kansas due to the town's long support of abolition. They ransacked the entire town and massacred about 190 civilians in the process.

=== St. Albans Raid (1864) ===
On October 19, 1864, Confederate soldiers without uniform operating from Canada raided the border town of St. Albans, Vermont, robbing $208,000 from three banks, holding hostages, killing a civilian, attempting to burn the entire town with Greek fire, then escaping back to Canada. The raiders were then arrested by British authorities under an extradition request from the U.S. government, but were later freed by a Canadian court on the grounds that they were considered combatants rather than criminals.

=== Lincoln assassination (1865) ===
Less than a week after Confederate general Robert E. Lee had surrendered to Union forces, marking the Union's victory in the American Civil War, a circle of Confederate sympathizers conspired to murder President Abraham Lincoln and members of his Cabinet in the hope of creating chaos and overthrowing the federal government. John Wilkes Booth successfully assassinated Lincoln.

=== The Colfax Massacre (1873) ===
The Colfax Massacre occurred in Colfax, Louisiana on Easter Sunday, April 13, 1873. Republicans had narrowly won the 1872 election to retain control of the state, but Democrats contested the results. Dozens of African-Americans were killed by white supremacist organizations such as the Knights of White Camellia and the Ku Klux Klan, who tried to reinforce antebellum policies of white supremacy.

=== Haymarket bombing (1886) ===
Two workers were killed by police in the course of a confrontation between striking workers and strikebreakers in the streets of Chicago. During a rally the next day, an unknown assailant threw dynamite at a line of police officers; the explosion and the mutual violence that followed killed eight police officers and at least four civilians. The attacker was most likely an anarchist, although the trial that convicted the members of a local anarchist cell has since been criticized as unfair.

=== Milwaukee Police Department bombing (1917) ===
The Milwaukee Police Department bombing was a November 24, 1917, bomb attack that killed ten people including nine members of local law enforcement. The perpetrators were never caught but are suspected to be an anarchist terrorist cell operating in the United States in the early 20th century. The target was an evangelical church in the Third Ward but killed only the police officers when the bomb was brought to the police station by a concerned member of the public.

=== Wall Street bombing (1920) ===
The Wall Street bombing was a terrorist incident on September 16, 1920, in the Financial District of New York City. A horse-drawn wagon filled with 100 pounds (45 kg) of dynamite was stationed across the street from the headquarters of the J.P. Morgan Bank. The explosion killed 38 and injured 400. Even though no one was found guilty, it is believed that the act was carried out by followers of Luigi Galleani.

=== Tulsa Race Massacre (1921) ===
On May 31 and June 1, 1921, a white mob started the Tulsa race massacre attacking residents and businesses of the African-American community known as Black Wall Street, in the Greenwood area in Tulsa, Oklahoma, in what is considered one of the worst incidents of racial violence in United States History. The attack, carried out on the ground and by air, destroyed more than 35 blocks of the district, did $30 million (2017 dollars) in damage, left 10,000 people homeless and up to 300 dead in a town considered the wealthiest black community in the nation.

=== 16th Street Baptist Church bombing (1963) ===
On Sunday, September 15, 1963, members of the United Klans of America set a bomb consisting of a timing device and fifteen sticks of dynamite to explode at a historically black church in Birmingham, Alabama, that was a local focus of the Civil Rights struggle. The explosion killed four girls between the ages of 11 and 14 and did much other local damage. Three perpetrators were eventually caught years later and sentenced to life imprisonment for their roles. There had been other bombings in Birmingham, then grimly known as "Bombingham" for such attacks.

=== Unabomber attacks (1978–1995) ===
From 1978 to 1995, Harvard University graduate and former mathematics professor Theodore "Ted" Kaczynski – known by the codename "UNABOM" until his identification and arrest by the FBI – carried out a campaign of sending letter bombs to academics and various individuals particularly associated with modern technology. In 1996, his manifesto was published in The New York Times and The Washington Post, under the threat of more attacks. The bomb campaign ended with his capture.

=== Attacks by the Jewish Defense League (1980–1985) ===
In a 2004 congressional testimony, John S. Pistole, executive assistant director for counterterrorism and counterintelligence for the FBI, described the JDL as "a known violent extremist Jewish Organization." FBI statistics show that, from 1980 through 1985, there were 18 terrorist attacks in the U.S. committed by Jews; 15 of those by members of the JDL. Mary Doran, an FBI agent, described the JDL in a 2004 Congressional testimony as "a proscribed terrorist group". Most recently, then-JDL chairman Irv Rubin was jailed while awaiting trial on charges of conspiracy in planning bomb attacks against the King Fahd Mosque in Culver City, California, and on the office of Arab-American congressman Darrell Issa. In its report, Terrorism 2000/2001, the FBI referred to the JDL as a "violent extremist Jewish organization" and stated that the FBI was responsible for thwarting at least one of its terrorist acts.

=== Oklahoma City bombing (1995) ===
The Oklahoma City bombing was a truck bomb attack by Timothy McVeigh and Terry Nichols which killed 168 people on April 19, 1995 – one of the deadliest domestic-based terrorist attack in the history of the United States. The target being a government building, it was an act of retribution for the FBI and ATF's involvement at Ruby Ridge and in the Waco siege. It inspired improvements to United States federal building security.

=== Centennial Olympic Park bombing (1996) ===
The Centennial Olympic Park bombing was a terrorist bombing on July 27, 1996, in Atlanta, Georgia, during the 1996 Summer Olympics, the first of four committed by Eric Robert Rudolph, former explosives expert for the United States Army. Two people died, and 111 were injured.

=== Wisconsin Sikh temple shooting (2012) ===
On August 5, 2012, Wade Michael Page fatally shot six people (including himself) and wounded four others in a mass shooting at a Sikh temple in Oak Creek, Wisconsin. Page was an American white supremacist and a United States Army veteran from Cudahy, Wisconsin, who was a member of the neo-Nazi skinhead Hammerskin Nation. All of the dead were members of the Sikh faith.

=== Boston Marathon bombing (2013) ===
On April 15, 2013, two homemade bombs detonated 12 seconds and 210 yards apart at 2:49 p.m., near the finish line of the 117th annual Boston Marathon, killing three people and injuring several hundred others, including a dozen people who lost limbs. Kyrgyz or Chechen-American brothers Dzhokhar Tsarnaev and Tamerlan Tsarnaev was apprehended and killed respectively, and claimed to have been motivated by radical Islamist beliefs.

=== Cartoon Drawing Contest shooting (2015) ===
On May 3, 2015, two gunmen, Elton Simpson and Nadir Soofi, wounded a security guard before police shot and killed them. The two men targeted an exhibit featuring cartoon images of Muhammad taking place in the Curtis Culwell Conference Center in Garland, Texas.

=== Charleston church shooting (2015) ===
On June 17, 2015, Dylann Roof, a 21-year-old white supremacist, went into the Emanuel African Methodist Episcopal Church in Charleston, South Carolina, and shot and killed nine people including South Carolina senator Clementa C. Pinckney. Roof was known to be a white supremacist who admired the Confederate States, Rhodesia and apartheid South Africa, and owned a website with a manifesto both called The Last Rhodesian in which he outlined his views toward blacks, among other peoples.

=== San Bernardino shooting (2015) ===
On December 2, 2015, 14 people were killed and 24 injured in a mass shooting at the Inland Regional Center in San Bernardino, California, United States. Syed Rizwan Farook and Tashfeen Malik targeted a San Bernardino County Department of Public Health training event and holiday party of about 80 employees in a rented banquet room. Farook was an American-born citizen of Pakistani descent, while his wife was a Pakistani-born legal resident of the U.S. He had attended the event as an employee before the shooting. Both had become radicalized through jihadist material on the internet, and stockpiled supplies in their home.

=== Pulse nightclub shooting (2016) ===
In the early hours of June 12, 2016, 49 people were killed and 53 were injured in a mass shooting at the Pulse nightclub in Orlando, Florida. The perpetrator, 29-year-old Omar Mateen, was a security guard and person of interest to the FBI in 2013 and 2014. At the time, this event was the deadliest mass shooting in U.S. history by a single gunman, later eclipsed by the 2017 Las Vegas shooting on October 1, 2017. Additionally, it was the deadliest confirmed terrorist attack on U.S. soil since the 9/11 attacks and the deadliest attack against LGBT people in U.S. history.

=== Congressional baseball shooting (2017) ===
While practice for the annual Congressional Baseball Game for Charity was going on, James Thomas Hodgkinson opened fire on Republican Congressmen and Congresswomen on the field such as U.S. House Majority Whip Steve Scalise, a U.S. Capitol Police Officer, a congressional aide and a lobbyist, resulting in 6 injuries (4 critical) and the perpetrator's death.

=== Charlottesville car attack (2017) ===
During the Charlottesville riots/Unite the Right rally on August 11–12, 2017 in Charlottesville, Virginia, by neo-Nazis, neo-fascists, white nationalists, alt-righters, Southern nationalists and Ku Klux Klansmen, Vanguard America (VA) member James Alex Fields drove his car into counter-protesters, killing 1 named Heather Heyer and injuring 28 others.

=== Pittsburgh synagogue shooting (2018) ===
On October 27, 2018, 11 people died and 6 more were injured at the Tree of Life - Or L'Simcha Congregation in Pittsburgh, Pennsylvania by Robert Bowers, a racial extremist. The attack was motivated by antisemitism and a belief in the white genocide conspiracy theory.

=== Escondido mosque fire and Poway synagogue shooting (2019) ===
On March 24, 2019, a mosque in Escondido, California, was set on fire; no one was injured and the fire was contained without major damage. The following month, on April 27, 2019, an elderly Jewish woman was killed and three others (including a Rabbi) were injured at the Chabad of Poway synagogue in Poway, California. The accused shooter, John T. Earnest, blamed Jews for "white genocide" and other ills in an antisemitic and racist open letter on 8chan confessing to the mosque arson and citing inspiration from the Christchurch mosque shooter Brenton Harrison Tarrant and Pittsburgh synagogue shooting perpetrator Robert Bowers.

=== El Paso Walmart shooting (2019) ===
On August 3, 2019, a domestic terrorist attack/mass shooting occurred at a Walmart store in El Paso, Texas, killing twenty-three people and injuring twenty-two others. The attack was carried out by Patrick Crusius, who wrote a manifesto and later posted it on 4chan in which he cited a supposed "Hispanic invasion of Texas" and "simply trying to defend my country from ethnic and cultural replacement brought on by an invasion" as motivations and also praising the perpetrator of the Christchurch mosque shootings.

=== Buffalo shooting (2022) ===
On May 14, 2022, a mass shooting occurred in Buffalo, New York, United States, at a Tops Friendly Markets supermarket in the East Side neighborhood. Ten people, all of whom were black, were murdered, and three people were injured. The perpetrator, 18-year-old Payton Gendron, livestreamed part of the attack on Twitch until the livestream was shut down by the service in under two minutes.

Gendron was inspired to carry out the attack after learning about numerous white supremacist mass murderers through 4chan during isolation caused by the COVID-19 pandemic. His main inspiration was the perpetrator of the Christchurch mosque shootings, who also livestreamed his attack online. After reading the shooter's manifesto, Gendron came to believe that it was his role in life to commit a similar attack to prevent an "uprising" against white people. He was taken into custody and charged with over 25 counts, including first-degree murder and terrorism. He pled not guilty to all of the charges on May 19.

On November 28, 2022, Gendron pleaded guilty to all state charges in the shooting, including murder, domestic terrorism, and hate crimes in an attempt to avoid the death penalty. On February 15, 2023, Gendron was sentenced to 11 concurrent life sentences without the possibility of parole. Jury selection in his federal trial began on October 13, 2026, and the federal prosecution has expressed their intention to seek the death penalty.

Gendron wrote a manifesto describing himself as an ethno-nationalist and a supporter of white supremacy who was motivated to commit acts of political violence. He voiced support for the Great Replacement conspiracy theory in the context of a white genocide. The attack has been described as an act of domestic terrorism, and it is also being investigated as a hate crime which was motivated by racism. Governor Kathy Hochul promised policy changes in the state as a result of the attack while condemning the shooter; shortly afterwards, the state of New York banned most semi-automatic sales to people under 21 and certain types of body armor. On March 19, 2024, a New York state judge ruled Reddit and YouTube must face lawsuits in connection with the mass shooting over accusations that they played a role in the radicalization of the shooter.

=== New Orleans truck attack (2025) ===
On January 1, 2025, Shamsud-Din Jabbar drove a pickup truck into a crowd on Bourbon Street in New Orleans, Louisiana, then exited the truck and engaged in a shootout with police before being fatally shot. Fifteen people were killed, including the perpetrator. An Islamic State (IS) flag was found in the truck. While Jabbar took violent inspiration from ISIS, investigators have not found evidence he had received any direct contact or direction from the terrorist group. Possible self-radicalization reflects a pattern seen in previous jihadist attacks.

== See also ==
- List of incidents of political violence in Washington, D.C.
- Anti-abortion violence in the United States
- Jihadist extremism in the United States
- Mass racial violence in the United States
- American militia movement
- Terrorism in the United States
- Right-wing terrorism
- Left-wing terrorism
