= CVLT (organization) =

Online child exploitation organization

- Other name: Cult
- Founder: Rohan Rane
- Leaders: Colin Walker, Kaleb Merritt
- Founded: 2020
- Dates active: 2020–2021
- Country: France
- Active regions: Worldwide
- Ideology: Anti-feminism; Antisemitism; Islamophobia; Misanthropy; Misogyny; Nihilistic violent extremism
- Part of: The Com

CVLT, also known as Cult, was an international nihilistic online organization that was responsible for acts of child exploitation. Several of the organization's leaders were arrested in the United States for producing child pornography and coercing minors to commit acts of self-harm. According to police, CVLT has exploited approximately 2 minors in California and 16 minors around the world in total. The US Department of Justice described it as "an online group that espoused neo-Nazism, nihilism, and pedophilia as its core principles". CVLT was affiliated with The Com, a broad network of international cybercriminals. CVLT became known after one of its leaders, Kaleb Merritt, was caught and convicted of raping a girl and taking inappropriate pictures of her.

CVLT was created in 2020 by an Indian school student named Rohan Rane. CVLT started out as a Discord community with a couple hundred members. Rohan then started attracting underage girls from around the world to join his community and chat with him and CVLT's members. Eventually, he managed to convince them to send him nude photos of themselves and used the photos to blackmail the girls into committing self-harm (including suicide) before being arrested in 2021; other members of CVLT were arrested in 2025. CVLT is considered to be a predecessor of 764, an influential child exploitation network. 764's founder, Bradley Cadenhead, was inspired by CVLT to create the network after talking with one of CVLT's members on a Minecraft server.

== History ==
=== Background ===
CVLT was created in 2020 by a then-23-year-old business school student named Rohan Rane, an Indian immigrant living in Antibes, France. Reportedly, he was bored from COVID-19 lockdown restrictions and decided to create his own community on Discord to chat with people, named CVLT. Rohan said the community was a "place where he came to proclaim his hatred of Jews and Muslims", with members of CVLT holding neo-Nazi and fascist ideologies. CVLT amassed over 150 members, some of whom were not able to be identified by the FBI during the investigation. An FBI agent became interested in CVLT in the spring of 2020 as he was investigating a 15-year-old American girl who unsuccessfully attempted to die of suicide by slashing her throat after communicating with Rohan. During the investigation, the agent learned that the girl sent Rohan nude photos of herself after he formed a "romantic relationship" with her and gained her trust. After obtaining the photos, Rohan blackmailed the girl into sending him additional photos, threatening to send the original photos to the girl's family members if she didn't comply. The agent began working with French law enforcement, prompting a judicial investigation on October 6, 2020, by OCRVP. Rohan was taken into custody the next year, on April 6, 2021, and is currently awaiting sentencing while being held in solitary confinement. Rane turned 28 years old in 2025 and is being charged with "acts of torture and barbarity", "corruption of minors in an organized gang" and "extortion in an organized gang".

During Rohan's arrest, the police searched his home and discovered more than a dozen videos of his victims on his phone and computer. The recordings showed young girls between the ages of 11 and 16, filming themselves committing acts of self-harm, including cutting themselves, strangling themselves with belts, and drinking bleach while crying. While in custody, Rohan described himself as a "psychopath devoid of any emotion". Rohan also said he was interested in fascism and the Aryan Brotherhood, and mentioned that he felt excited by seeing "blood and violence" from his victims. Le Figaro reported that Rohan authored a guide titled "How to Get a Girl", in which he described himself as a guru and bragged about attracting dozens of young girls. The guide explained his methods of attracting his victims, including threatening to ruin the lives of his "prey" and forcing them to commit suicide, eat feces, and mutilate themselves by shoving blunt objects into their genitalia. Rohan also said that all "western feminists" have rape fantasies. Rohan was permitted access to his phone during his incarceration, which he used to continue his activities. In an interview with investigators, Rohan said that all of the girls filmed were adults who performed the actions willingly and that all acts were staged, including their expressions of pain. In one interrogation, he said there was no connection between CVLT and 764, and that he had a hatred of humanity. He confessed to targeting girls of Jewish and Muslim origin, as well as "feminists who denounced Hitler or Mussolini".

=== Organization ===
In a Reddit post before his arrest, Rohan described CVLT as "dark and sadistic", adding that he made his "slaves" cut his name on their bodies and that everything he did was "legal". Rane added that the "ultimate goal" of CVLT was to "create an endless supply of masochistic people to satisfy my sadism and my cult is existing for that very reason". Two men, Colin Walker and Kaleb Merritt acted as leaders of CVLT, and were responsible for hosting and maintaining CVLT's online servers and controlling its membership. Both men were arrested and charged with one count of engaging in a child exploitation enterprise in 2025. Kaleb Merritt was one of the first CVLT's members and a prominent child groomer within the group. Merritt used the online nicknames "eterrorist", "o9a", and "evil". One of CVLT's affiliated groups, led by Bradley Cadenhead, broke off and became known as 764. Before creating 764, Cadenhead produced child exploitation videos of him mutilating himself and committing animal abuse under the online names "brad764", "felix" and "felix764" through the CVLT community. Some splinter groups of CVLT have neo-Nazi and accelerationist ideologies, mimicking the style of the Terrorgram network. Both CVLT and 764 are influenced by the Order of Nine Angles (O9A) and its ideologies. Le Monde said both organizations had many members who pledged allegiance to O9A.

Rohan stated that there was a hierarchy within CVLT, and that members of the group were promoted to higher "ranks" based on the severity of illegal content they uploaded. Rohan used Instagram and other social medias to promote CVLT, including Roblox. After a victim joined the community, he manipulated them into sending sexual photos of themselves before using the photos to blackmail them. CVLT targeted mostly vulnerable children and made them watch violent and pornographic videos to desensitize them to violence and sadism, including animals being tortured to death or women being raped on camera. Rohan forced his victims to cut his name or Nazi swastikas into their skin, masturbate using knives, drink bleach, or eat their own hair. If they did not comply, he threatened to reveal the photos to the girls' relatives, with other members of CVLT occasionally carrying out the threats. All acts were recorded on webcams and broadcast live on the CVLT Discord server. Other acts included victims punching themselves, calling themselves racial slurs, victims being swatted, or being forced to commit suicide on livestreams. According to a prosecutor, other unnamed suspects may have participated in CVLT's activities.

Throughout its history, the organization managed to sextort approximately 16 children around the world, including two children living in San Bernardino County, California. The home countries of victims included Canada, the United Kingdom, Germany, New Zealand, and Estonia. Martín Estrada, a former prosecutor in California, said that there may be hundreds of unidentified victims based on the amount of child sexual abuse videos CVLT produced. According to police, victims were known to have a history of sexual abuse-induced trauma or mental health issues. CVLT was a member of The Com, an international cybercriminal network made of various groups, with extremist groups of The Com being known to carry out similar crimes. CVLT was described by law enforcement as a neo-Nazi group, however an unnamed cyber security expert quoted by Rolling Stone said that the group only used neo-Nazism for shock value and to appear more provocative while not genuinely believing in Nazism. Le Monde described neo-Nazi aesthetics of CVLT and 764 as "confused and poorly understood", saying they existed only to portray "acceptance" for their members.

== Investigation and arrests ==
Mugshot of Kaleb Merritt

In 2021, CVLT and its splinter group 764 fell under investigation by law enforcement after Rohan was arrested in France and Kaleb Merritt, one of CVLT's leaders living in Texas, was arrested and convicted of kidnapping and raping a minor. Merritt is currently serving a 33 year sentence in Pocahontas State Correctional Center. Reportedly, Merritt communicated with an underage girl on a CVLT Discord server and convinced her to run away from her family to have sex with him in the woods. The police found Merritt and the girl in Henderson, N.C. and arrested him. The girl later said that Merritt made her cut his name into her leg and pressured her to send him inappropriate photos of herself to prove her "devotion" to their relationship. He was later charged with violating four more children. In 2022, all remaining high-profile members of CVLT joined 764 and resumed their criminal activity using CVLT's methods.

In January 2021, Riley Williams, participant of January 6 Capitol attack who stole the laptop of Nancy Pelosi, bragged about her crime on a CVLT-affiliated Discord server. She was later arrested and sentenced to three years in prison. In April 2021, 21-year old CVLT member Richard Ehiemere was arrested in East London by Metropolitan Police for possessing 29 indecent images of children on his phone. The National Crime Agency first investigated Ehiemere when he was 17-years old, when he first joined the CVLT Discord server. Ehiemere was charged and convicted on two counts of fraud and three counts of sharing indecent images of children on the CVLT server that he visited 383 times. Ehiemere was sentenced in May 2025 to 12 months in prison, an 18 month suspended sentence, and 10 years of restrictions. On December 13, 2023, the FBI arrested 18-year-old Kalana Limkin for possession of child pornography. Limkin's court records showed that he was a former member of CVLT and 764. Limkin also confessed to being the founder of splinter group Cultist while in custody. During 2023, the FBI issued warnings regarding 764 and its subgroups, including CVLT. On December 11, 2024, 20-year-old Baron Martin was arrested and charged with production of child pornography and cyberstalking on Discord. He was a member of CVLT and 764.

In February 2025, two members of CVLT in the US were arrested on one count of engaging in a child exploitation enterprise. The arrestees were Clint Borge (who had engaged in this behavior as early as 2019), a 43-year-old man living in Pāhoa, Hawaii and Collin Walker, a 23-year-old man in Bridgeton, New Jersey. The police also charged two leaders of CVLT who were already incarcerated, Rohan Rane and Kaleb Merritt on similar charges. The two men are currently awaiting sentencing, subject to 20 years in prison with a maximum sentence of life without parole. The arrest operation was initiated in November 2020, after a student of Iowa State University made a police report regarding a person she met online in 2018 that was trying to coerce and abuse her. Two months later, an investigator assigned to the case began investigating Borge's IP address, tracking the owner using banking data, executing a search warrant of his residence and interrogating him in August 2021. The agent contacted the Crimes Against Children Task Force to assist with the case, later identifying Borge to an HSI-led case in California, involving four CVLT members, one of whom was still unidentified. The agent informed HSI about Borge leading to his identification and subsequent connection to the group. The investigation took four years to complete.

== See also ==
- No Lives Matter
- 764 (organization)
