= NVE =

NVE may refer to:

- NVE Corp., a manufacturer of Magnetoresistive RAM (formed 1989)
- NVE ensemble, in statistical thermodynamics
- Native valve endocarditis, of the heart
- Nihilistic violent extremism, in criminology
- Norwegian Water Resources and Energy Directorate, a government agency (formed 1921; (Norwegian: Norges vassdrags- og energidirektorat)
