= Raymond Riles =

American convicted murderer formerly on death row

- Born: Raymond George Riles; June 1, 1950 (age 76); Harris County, Texas, U.S.
- Occupation: Trucker
- Known for: 45-year stint on death row
- Conviction: Capital murder
- Penalty: Death; commuted to life imprisonment

Raymond George Riles (born June 1, 1950) is an American convicted murderer who was on death row in Texas from 1976 until he was resentenced to life imprisonment in June 2021. At the time of his resentencing, Riles had been on death row longer than anyone else in the United States. He was convicted of the December 1974 capital murder of John Henry, a Houston used car salesman. Riles was ruled competent to stand trial in the 1970s, but while on death row he was repeatedly found to be too mentally ill to execute.

Riles's initial capital conviction was reversed on appeal because prosecutors improperly introduced evidence of a separate crime during that trial. In 1978, Riles was convicted again and resentenced to the death penalty. In 1985, he was badly burned when he set his prison cell on fire in a suicide attempt. A 1986 scheduled execution was stayed because of concerns over whether the death penalty was disproportionately applied to black perpetrators with white victims. In 2008, an assistant district attorney in Harris County said that Riles's mental illness prevented him from being executed, but she said his mental health was tested on a regular basis on death row and that he could become eligible for execution.

In February 2021, attorneys for Riles filed a habeas petition for a new punishment hearing before the Texas Court of Criminal Appeals because potential mitigating factors such as mental illness were not considered in the 1970s when Riles received his death sentence. On April 15, 2021, the Texas Court of Criminal Appeals granted the petition, indicating that Riles was entitled to the same considerations as someone who was being sentenced to the death penalty in recent years. On June 9, 2021, Riles was resentenced to life in prison. He was denied parole in January 2025.

== Background ==
Riles was born in 1950 in Harris County, Texas. He completed seven years of education and later earned a general equivalency diploma (GED). Riles's arrest record, which began when he was a juvenile, included arrests for attempted rape, burglary, and robbery. He worked as a truck driver. Family members said that Riles was always "a little funny"; they said he prayed in foreign languages and sometimes referred to himself by other names. A judge said that he had several members of Riles's family involuntarily committed.

In December 1974, Riles fatally shot John Thomas Henry, the 31-year-old owner of a used car dealership in Houston. Riles had accompanied Herbert Washington to John Henry Motors, where Washington had purchased a used vehicle. Armed with guns, Riles and Washington approached Henry about problems they had with the car; the men demanded a refund of the down payment. Henry said that he would not issue a refund but that he would repair the vehicle. In response, Riles pushed Henry and then shot him from behind. The bullet went into Henry's brain, but he was still alive when Riles stood over him and again demanded money.

After Henry gave Riles a roll of bills, Riles and Washington went to Herby's Foods and asked the store manager about job openings. When the manager refused to give them job applications, Riles and Washington robbed the manager and his wife at gunpoint, getting away with about $1800. Police officers later spotted the pair in Washington's car, and a police chase ensued at speeds of up to 100 miles per hour (160 km/h). When Washington crashed his car into a truck, Washington and Riles exchanged gunfire with police officers before fleeing on foot. Washington was shot in the hand and then apprehended quickly, but Riles, bleeding from a wound to the arm, entered a nearby home. The homeowner, who was a San Jacinto College police officer, placed a tourniquet on Riles's arm and subdued him until help arrived.

== Conviction and appeal ==
At trial, Riles's lawyers called expert witnesses who testified that Riles suffered from delusions, psychotic thoughts, and schizophrenia. The state presented experts who testified that Riles was faking mental illness. A psychiatrist testified that Riles acted like a dog when she tried to interview him; he bayed at the moon, barked, and tried to bite her. Washington testified that he once saw Riles attempt to tie his wife to a railroad track as a train neared, screaming at her, "Repent, Jezebel!"

Riles had multiple outbursts in the courtroom. At various points, he broke a doorjamb, screamed at the judge and prosecution team, and attempted to jump over the defense table to attack the judge. Riles ultimately had to be held in a nearby cell while the proceedings continued. The prosecutor later said that he thought Riles was attempting to act like he was insane, but he also said that the judge started to carry a handgun under his robe after the trial.

Riles was convicted of capital murder and sentenced to death. Washington was also sent to death row on a capital murder conviction, but it was later thrown out; he was then sentenced to 50 years for the attempted murder of a police officer. Washington was granted parole in 1983. Riles's first conviction and death sentence were overturned on appeal because prosecutors had presented evidence of an unrelated crime (the armed robbery 40 minutes after the shooting of Henry) at Riles's murder trial. In 1978, Riles was retried, resulting in another capital murder conviction and death sentence.

== Subsequent legal challenges ==
Riles received execution dates of June 18, 1980, and March 17, 1982, for which he received stays of execution. In early 1985, Riles was one of ten Texas death row prisoners who signed a petition asking to be executed in lieu of pursuing further appeals. On May 21, 1985, Riles surrounded himself with piles of papers, Bibles, and other books and started a fire in his cell with the intention of committing suicide. He was hospitalized with burns over 30% of his body. The day before his suicide attempt, death row inmates in the recreation yard saw Riles rolling in the dirt, eating grass, and trying to communicate with Mother Earth and Allah.

In 1986, Riles was nearly executed. He was scheduled to die by lethal injection on September 17 of that year. An appeal before the United States Court of Appeals for the Fifth Circuit, which had challenged the appropriateness of Riles' legal assistance at his original trial, was unsuccessful. In Riles v. McCotter, Judge Alvin Rubin wrote that Riles might not have received the death penalty if he had able legal counsel. However, he wrote that the U.S. Constitution did not require effective counsel for defendants; he said it only required counsel that was not legally ineffective. "Consequently, accused persons who are represented by 'not-legally-ineffective' lawyers may be condemned to die when the same accused, if represented by effective counsel, would receive at least the clemency of a life sentence," he wrote.

On September 16, the U.S. Supreme Court evaluated claims from Riles's attorney, Will Gray, that Riles was insane. Gray pointed to Riles's statements that God had killed Henry. The Supreme Court voted to allow the execution to proceed. In the hours before his scheduled execution, Riles told a Muslim prison chaplain that he was ready to be executed. Riles did not want any friends or family members to witness his execution, but he spent time that day with his brother and two daughters. Two hours before Riles's scheduled execution, after considering a separate claim from Riles's attorneys that black men with white victims are disproportionately sentenced to death, U.S. district judge Gabrielle McDonald issued a stay of execution. That stay was upheld by the U.S. Supreme Court. On January 10, 1988, the Associated Press reported that Riles had another execution date in four days and said that a stay of execution was not likely. Riles did receive a stay, however, as the state district court withdrew the warrant for his execution.

== Ongoing mental health concerns ==
Riles remained on death row, and in 2008, Roe Wilson, a Harris County assistant district attorney, said that while Riles was not eligible for execution at that time due to his psychiatric illness, he would become subject to execution if his mental health status were to improve. She dismissed concerns that death row prisoners have limited access to mental health services. "That really is not a factor in this case," said Wilson. "What the factor is, is that (Riles) was competent when he was tried and given a legal sentence. His confinement is still legal and he simply has a condition right now that makes him not eligible for execution. But that could change."

In a 2008 interview with a television news station, Riles said that God was responsible for Henry's murder and Riles's 1985 suicide attempt. He said that authorities were silencing him because he had knowledge of "the satanic secret societies of the TDC shadow government e-system."

== Resentencing ==
Riles's attorneys decided to petition the courts for a new sentence after a 2019 Texas Court of Criminal Appeals ruling that overturned the 1980 death sentence of Cesar Fierro because of inadequate jury instructions. In Fierro's case, the appeals court ruled that juries should be instructed to consider potential mitigating factors that could lead them to recommend a life sentence instead of the death penalty. When the district attorney decided not to pursue the death penalty again, Fierro was sentenced to life imprisonment and then released on parole in 2020.

In February 2021, Harris County District Attorney Kim Ogg said that she supported Riles's request for resentencing before the Texas Court of Criminal Appeals. She said that today certain factors, like a history of childhood trauma, must be considered before a defendant is sentenced, and she said that Riles is entitled to the same considerations as defendants who are being sentenced today. On April 14, 2021, the Texas Court of Criminal Appeals granted Riles's habeas petition for a new sentencing hearing.

Riles appeared on Zoom for his resentencing hearing on June 9, 2021. His attorneys requested that the hearing be conducted on Zoom because Riles was at high risk for contracting COVID-19; in addition to his mental illness, Riles has been treated for heart disease and prostate cancer. State district judge Ana Martinez presided over the hearing. Members of Henry's family appeared at the hearing but did not make statements.

Martinez resentenced Riles to life imprisonment with the possibility of parole. Since Texas did not issue sentences of life imprisonment without the possibility of parole ("life without parole") at the time of Riles's conviction, Martinez could not hand down that sentence. Riles immediately became eligible for parole consideration. He was denied parole in November 2021 and January 2025. The parole board cited the nature of his crime as the basis for their decisions.

== See also ==
- List of longest prison sentences served
