= Larping (slang) =

2020s synonym of poseur

In internet culture and slang, larping is the act of being a poseur. The word comes from the acronym for live action role-playing (LARP). It is meant to imply the person is physically "role-playing" as a fan. It has also been used more broadly to mean the act of being performative.

== Etymology ==
The term is derived from the abbreviation of live action role-play, which is a form of roleplay in which participants act out their selected character physically. The term larper then started to gain use in online forums in the late 2010s as a pejorative for individuals who pretend to have more far-right politics than they actually do. In 2026, the word spread to TikTok, where it became widely prominent and a more general metaphor for "pretending to be something you're not." Internet radio platform Audacy reported that larp became the second-most searched slang term in Texas of 2026. Neon Music writer Tara Price noted that the word has largely replaced poseur in usage, which they attribute to the word implying the posing is deliberate and for personal gain.

== Related terms ==
=== LarpTube ===
LarpTube is a community in which users roleplay as popular YouTubers and replicate their old style of content. One of the most popular projects to come out of the community is the Larp SMP, a parody of the Dream SMP in which participants act out the roles of the original server's members. The addition of a roleplayer for Technoblade, a member who died of cancer, led to fan discourse. Technoblade's family later requested the channel stop roleplaying him, leading Technolarp to apologize for not being "emotionally adept" and rebrand.

=== Larpercore/Edgesphere ===
Larpercore is a term used in online subcultures linked to nihilistic violent extremism, referring to an internet aesthetic that stages or simulates events ranging from cyberbullying to real-world violence. A glossary of violent subcultures published by the Ministério Público do Rio Grande do Sul (MPRS), the state prosecutors' office of Rio Grande do Sul, Brazil, describes it as drawing on live action role-playing (LARP), with participants acting out the behavior and rhetoric of shooters, terrorists or "martyrs" and producing images, videos, music and memes that mix humor, nihilism and symbolic violence. The same glossary says the aesthetic has been observed in the True Crime Community and in networks tied to the Com network, where it is said to be an entry point to radicalization by normalizing hateful language and the glorification of attackers.

According to Felix Neumann, a researcher at the Konrad-Adenauer-Stiftung, "Larpercore" is one of several subcultures within the "Edgesphere", a collection of shifting and overlapping extreme internet subcultures that emerged between 2018 and 2020. Other elements of the "Edgesphere" include incels, true crime communities, gore networks, and "Foodists". Neumann also identifies the Com network as part of this environment, noting that nihilistic violence can develop within these subcultures and spread between them.

== See also ==
- Fan loyalty
