= Maniac Murder Cult =

Neo-Nazi Satanist group

- Маньяки: культ убийства
- Logo of the Murder Maniac Cult
- Founder: Yegor Krasnov ("Egor Yakovlev”)
- Leaders: Yegor Krasnov (2017–2020); Michail Chkhikvishvili (July 2022–March 2024)
- Founded: 2017
- Dates active: 2017–present
- Country: Ukraine (country of origin)
- Active regions: Worldwide
- Ideology: Neo-Nazism; Nazi-Satanism; Militant accelerationism
- Political position: Far-right
- Status: Active
- Part of: National Socialist Order of Nine Angels (until 2023)

Maniac Murder Cult (MKU, MMC, or MKY, Russian: Маньяки: культ убийства) is an international decentralized neo-Nazi accelerationist and Satanist group established in Dnipro, Ukraine in 2017. MKU operates primarily in Russia, Ukraine, and Europe, while their affiliated groups operate across the world, including the United States.

Much of the information regarding MKU's origins comes from the organisation itself and Russian state media, causing inconsistencies between sources. Based on social media posts, MKU was founded in Dnipro, Ukraine, in 2017 by a pseudonymous figure known as "Egor Yakovlev", whom Russian authorities identified as Yegor Krasnov, a 21-year-old Ukrainian. He established the group after being expelled from an unnamed ultranationalist organisation in Russia. The MKU has published a series of handbooks titled The Hater's Handbook, the most notable of which is its third edition. The handbooks contain material on weaponry, planning attacks, evading law enforcement, manipulation, and other subjects. They are available in Russian and English. The publications have been linked to several acts of real-world violence, including the 2024 Eskişehir stabbing, the 2025 Antioch High School shooting, and the 2025 Odintsovo school attack.

The MKU's ideology combines neo-Nazism, Satanism, and militant accelerationism, with an emphasis on the use violence to accelerate the perceived collapse of Western society. The group promotes violence against racial and ethnic minorities, Jewish people, homeless individuals, people with mental illnesses, and other groups it identifies as undesirable. The group also embraces the form of Satanism espoused by the Order of Nine Angles.

The MKU is associated with an online network known as "The Com", which includes groups such as 764, No Lives Matter (NLM), and the National Socialist Order of Nine Angels (NSO9A). The MKU is designated as a terrorist group by multiple countries.

== Ideology ==
The logo used by the Order of Nine Angels, which the Maniac Murder Cult took ideological inspiration from.

The logo used by the Thule Society, which the Maniac Murder Cult took ideological inspiration from.

The MKU's primary ideological influences are Nazism and Satanism, which its texts characterize as the most "hateful" belief systems. The group's interpretation of Nazism incorporates militant accelerationism, while its Satanist influences draw on the practices and imagery of the ONA and the Tempel ov Blood. Members' engagement with these ideologies appears to focus largely on their violent elements and associated aesthetics rather than their philosophy. Although the MKU adopts elements of ONA's aesthetic, it appears to engage less with its underlying esoteric practices. Another ideological influence is the Thule Society, an organization established in Munich, Germany, in 1918 following World War I. Combining German nationalism with occult interests, the society took its name from the mythical Thule, which was believed to be the homeland of the Aryan race. Its ideology incorporated racism and antisemitism.

The MKU has an emphasis on the use of violence to accelerate the perceived collapse of Western society. The group promotes violence against racial and ethnic minorities, Jewish people, homeless individuals, people with mental illnesses, and other groups it identifies as undesirable. Its ideological material also references serial killers and mass murderers as figures of admiration or emulation. These include the perpetrator of the 2019 Christchurch mosque shootings, the Unabomber (Ted Kaczynski), the Zodiac Killer, Joseph Paul Franklin, and the Dnepropetrovsk maniacs.

The MKU's variant of militant accelerationism was described by the Combating Terrorism Center as being "fairly unique among its peers", as, rather than promoting a consistent ideology and relying on small cells to plan and carry out acts of mass violence, the MKU emphasizes the individual as the primary means of achieving its objectives.

== History ==
“I convinced everyone that it was necessary to kill,” said Krasnov in his biography. “Convinced everyone that in order to achieve the common goal of the ideology it is necessary to kill all people. They followed me. We started to act. I created a cult of murder.”

— Egor Krasnov in the Hater's Handbook Third Edition

=== Establishment and early publications (2017–2019) ===
Much of the information regarding MKU's origins comes from the organisation itself and Russian state media, making independent verification difficult due to inconsistencies between sources. According to the groups own claims, the MKU was established after a pseudonymous figure known as "Egor Yakovlev", whom Russian authorities identified as Yegor Krasnov, a 21-year-old Ukrainian, was kicked out of an unspecified ultranationalist group. Upon creation in 2017, the MKU started recruiting in Dnipro, Ukraine, and Russia. MKU published its first videos in 2018 on the 2channel anonymous imageboard.

By 2019, short videos showing attacks on random victims, some of which appeared to be homeless people, were being shared on the Russian social media service VK and Telegram. In total, 38 of these videos, showing at least 33 different attacks in Dnipro, Ukraine were released on Telegram and VK. There were also at least three other MKU-linked attacks that occurred in Saint Petersburg, Russia. The videos contained neo-Nazi symbolism related to skinhead culture, including swastikas, Nazi salutes, and common attire such as white bootlaces and red suspenders. MKU's videos have often used horrorcore music, a genre combining that combines electronic music, metal, and rap.

=== Arrest of leader, crackdown, and growth of real-world violence (2020–2022) ===
In 2020, MKU leader Krasnov was arrested in connection to a series of attacks in the Dnieper region of Ukraine, including an assault on two people. According to police, Krasnov and seven others MKU members were responsible for five different attacks throughout the region. In 2021, 18 people were arrested across six Russian cities, including Gelendzhik, Moscow, Saint Petersburg, Tambov, Voronezh, and Yaroslavl. Russia's Federal Security Service also claimed to have carried out searches against 106 alleged supporters of the MKU, including a 17-year-old boy, who was arrested for allegedly carrying 14 molotov cocktails towards a military installation in Rostov-on-Don, Russia. Despite the arrests, the group remained active in producing propaganda online and became increasingly active in real-world violence.

=== Continued activity, Eskişehir stabbing, and Antioch Highschool shooting (2022–present) ===
17-year-old Nino Luciano H. (alias "Tobbz"), an adopted German teenager, livestreamed himself attacking an 82-year-old man in March 2022, two weeks later he livestreamed the fatal stabbing of a 74-year-old woman, whom he believed to be Romani, on a 764-affiliated Discord server. He carried out the attack to "prove himself" as a member MKU. He was sentenced to 14 years in prison in August 2023. The perpetrator of the 2023 Bryansk school shooting, was suspected of having communicated with "curators" from MKU prior to the attack.

In March 2023, the NSO9A published footage of MKU attacks that occurred in 2018–2019 on its website. After the 2024 Dagestan attacks, the MKU released a video showing a small explosion near the entrance of the Fryazino Muslim Center in the Moscow region, Russia. The group claimed responsibility for the blast, stating that it occurred on June 23, 2024. A few months later in August 2024, a livestreamed mass stabbing occurred outside a mosque in Eskişehir, Turkey. A manifesto attributed to the attacker included references to Michail Chkhikvishvili (alias "Commander Butcher"), the self-proclaimed MKU leader. Before the attack, the attacker also distributed The Hater’s Handbook.

In early 2025, a 19-year-old from Winnipeg, Canada was arrested for spray-painting racist graffiti. The 19-year-old was charged with four terrorism-related changes after investigators discovered links to the MKU. Another MKU-linked incident occurred on January 22, 2025, a 17-year-old student killed one person and injured another before committing suicide at Antioch High School in Nashville, Tennessee. In an audio recording posted online, the attacker claimed he was acting on behalf of the MKU, and directly mentioned Chkhikvishvili. In December 2025, a mass stabbing occurred in Odintsovo, Russia. Fifteen-year-old Timofey Vladimirovich Kulyamov carried out the attack using guidance from an MKU manual that contained information on the use of knives. In early 2026, Evan Banda, a teenager from Fort Worth, Texas, United States, was arrested on January 8, 2026 for allegedly committing five arsons in Fort Worth, Texas. According to the Fort Worth Police Department, Banda is allegedly linked to the MKU.

==== Arrest of Chkhikvishvili and poisoned candy plot (2022–2025) ====
From July 2022 until March 2024, Chkhikvishvili served as the self-proclaimed leader of the MKU. In June 2022, Chkhikvishvili traveled to Brooklyn, United States, where he repeatedly urged others, primarily through Telegram, to carry out acts of violence on behalf of the MKU. In November 2023, Chkhikvishvili began developing a plan to carry out a mass-casualty attack in New York City during New Year's Eve celebrations. According to the United States Department of Justice, the proposed plot involved disguising an individual as Santa Claus and distributing poisoned candy to racial minorities and children attending Jewish schools in Brooklyn. Chkhikvishvili sent the The Mujahideen Poisons Handbook to an undercover agent who had infiltrated the MKU and identified ricin as the easiest poison to produce.

Chkhikvishvili was arrested in Moldova in 2024 and extradited to the United States in May 2025. Chkhikvishvili was sentenced to 15 years in prison for soliciting hate crimes and acts of mass violence. He pleaded guilty in November 2025.

== Alliances ==
The MKU is associated with the broad online network known as "The Com", which includes groups such as 764, NLM, and the NSO9A; being described as one of The Com's "most visible and dangerous elements".

The MKU has formed alliances with militant accelerationist groups in North America and Europe such as NSO9A, which emerged as the successor to the National Socialist Order, itself a successor organization to the Atomwaffen Division. In March 2023, the NSO9A identified MKU as a "Sinister Affiliate" in a post on its website concerning the "Trident of Association". The post defined "Sinister Affiliates" as “groups within the NSO9A that break off to form another group at the behest of the Trident.” Another group associated with the MKU is the Satanic Front, which has links to the Tempel ov Blood. The Satanic Front has stated that its objective is to establish an operational unit focused on carrying out real-world violence rather than focusing on esotericism. NLM serves as the English-language offshoot of MKU, with a focus on recruiting members from the English-speaking world. NLM has translated Russian manuals to English.

== Recruitment and "Murder Points" ==
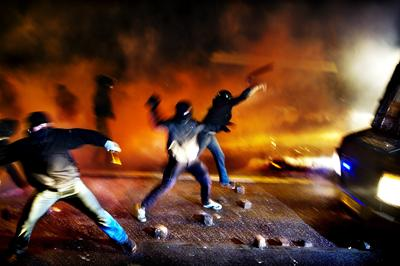
In the Hater's Handbook Third Edition the Maniac Murder Cult encourages aspiring members to carry out criminal actions before officially being admitted to the group.

After contacting the group, potential members must take a detailed "entrance exam" and record themselves carrying out criminal actions before officially being admitted to the group. The group divides these crimes into four categories:

- "Direct actions": assault, murder, arson, and terrorism
- "IT": computer viruses, websites, swatting, doxing, and hacking
- "Recruitment/campaigning": recruiting new members and creating propaganda
- "Microbiology": creation of chemical weapons and poisons

After joining the group, members are required to participate in a scoring system known as "Murder Points", which evaluates their criminal activities. Members are required to achieve a minimum score of 300 points to maintain active status, with disciplinary measures applied to those who fail to meet the threshold. Punishments include suspension, expulsion, and, for the most serious offences, execution. Activities are assigned different point values based on factors such as the degree of violence involved and the quality of the recorded footage. The group organizes these activities into six categories:

- "IT": 300 Murder Points
- "Microbiology": 300 Murder Points
- "Murder": 200 Murder Points
- "Terrorist Attack": 200 Murder Points
- "Beating": 100 Murder Points
- "Recruiting": 100 Murder Points
- "Campaigning": 50 Murder Points
- "Other": 50 Murder Points

Photographs documenting activities such as placing inscriptions, stickers, or leaflets in public places are also included in the system. It also corresponds to a system of “levels", that are achieved based on the crimes an individual has committed for the group.

== The Hater's Handbooks ==
Artwork from the Hater's Handbook Third Edition featuring imagery similar to artwork attributed to Patrick Gordon Macdonald (alias “Dark Foreigner”).

As of September 2024, the MKU has published three instructional and ideological handbooks titled The Hater's Handbook. The first edition, released in 2020, is 52 pages long, while the second edition, published in 2022, contains 54 pages. The third edition was released on October 30, 2023 and expanded to 122 pages. Originally written in Russian, machine-translated English versions became available in 2022. Manuals offer advice on weaponry, attacks, avoiding law enforcement, manipulation, and other tips.

=== Hater's Handbook Third Edition ===
The Hater's Handbook Third Edition is by far the longest version published. It describes alliances with other groups, including the Satanic Front, NSO9A, and NLM, and features essays contributed by members of the Satanic Front and NSO9A. The handbook targets individuals identifying as sociopaths, murderers, and school shooters, with the third edition explicitly encouraging school shooters to carry out attacks in association with MKU. It also introduces a biography of founder Egor Krasnov and claims that the group has allegedly committed more than 50 murders and 150 other actions between 2017 and 2023. The handbook encourages members to record and distribute their violent activities to inspire future attackers.

The Hater's Handbook Third Edition also refers to mass murderers such as Brenton Tarrant and Anders Behring Breivik as “saints”, a term also used in other accelerationist circles. Some of its content bears similarities to material associated with other figures in these circles, including Telegram user RapeWaffen. Its illustrations have also been compared to artwork attributed to Canadian neo-Nazi graphic designer Patrick Gordon Macdonald (alias “Dark Foreigner”), who was arrested by Canadian law enforcement in July 2023 in connection with Atomwaffen Division. However, it has not been established whether Macdonald produced the illustrations.

== Terrorist designations ==
Country	Since	References
Russia	January 16, 2023	
United Kingdom	July 2, 2025	
New Zealand	December 7, 2025	
Canada	December 8, 2025	

== See also ==
- Terrorgram, network of neo-Nazi Telegram channels
- National Socialism / White Power, Russian neo-Nazi extremist group
- Rusich Group, neo-Nazi paramilitary group in Russia
- Misanthropic Division, Ukrainian neo-Nazi paramilitary group
