= Riley Williams =

American Capitol rioter (born 1998)

Riley June Williams
- Born: 1998 (age 27–28); Harrisburg, Pennsylvania, US
- Citizenship: United States
- Education: Mechanicsburg Area Senior High School
- Known for: Participation in January 6 United States Capitol attack
- Criminal penalty: 36 months in prison
- Criminal status: Released (presidential pardon)
- Parents: Rickey Williams (father); Wendy Williams (mother)

Riley June Williams is an American woman who participated in the January 6 United States Capitol attack in 2021. Williams entered the Capitol and stole a government-issued laptop and a gavel belonging to Speaker of the House Nancy Pelosi. Pelosi's deputy chief of staff said the laptop was used for presentations. Williams is considered to be a fan of Nick Fuentes, a far-right political activist; she also expressed far-right white supremacist views on social media. Her crimes made national headlines.

Williams bragged about her crime on a Discord server and discussed her plan to sell the laptop to Russian foreign intelligence services. The server was reportedly affiliated with CVLT, a child exploitation organization. She was arrested by federal authorities on January 18, 2021, and charged with disorderly conduct and violent entry. On March 21, 2023, U.S. District Judge Amy Berman Jackson found Williams guilty and sentenced her to 36 months in prison. Her release was scheduled for March 14, 2025, but she was released on January 20, 2025, after being pardoned by Donald Trump. The stolen laptop has not been recovered, and her lawyer continues to defend her and say she did not steal anything.

== Personal life ==
=== Birth and family ===
Judge Jackson said Williams was "born the same year" as Nick Fuentes (1998). She reportedly lived in Harrisburg, Pennsylvania, in an apartment she shared with her mother. In 2017, Williams graduated from Mechanicsburg Area Senior High. From 2017 to 2019, she committed six traffic violations in Cumberland and Dauphin. Her mother has called Williams an "empathetic and loving person" who worked for Keystone Human Services, a health care agency. Williams had a relationship with a man living in New Jersey. Reportedly, their relationship was brief and non-abusive. Court records showed that her father lived in Camp Hill, worked as a security guard, was charged with possession of child porn in 2024 and released on bail. He was found guilty by a jury and is currently incarcerated.

=== Political views ===
Nine weeks before participating in the January 6 attack, Williams posted videos of herself on social media performing Nazi salutes. One video showed her saying she wanted to "kill all black people in America" while wearing a face mask with extremist emblems. Her friend told the press she was "obsessed" with far-right political pundit Nick Fuentes, viewing him as a "god". Williams's mother, Wendy, said that Williams became interested in the America First movement in 2020 and was known to associate herself with far-right figures. This reportedly led Wendy to avoid political discussions with her. Wendy also said that Williams was "addicted to the internet", was a fan of the troll group Groyper Army, and attended political rallies. She was a known member of "The Camps", a neo-Nazi chat room created by former Marine Christopher Pohlhaus, a founder of the neo-Nazi group Blood Tribe. That became known after an anonymous tipster shared pictures of Williams talking in the chatroom under a known username to Vice Magazine, which confirmed that they were "authentic and undoctored". Pohlhaus said he did not remember seeing Williams there and warned members of the chatroom not to participate in the attack. According to the prosecutor in her trial, Williams believed Donald Trump's debunked claim that the 2020 United States presidential election was stolen and was "obsessed" with it. He also said that her internet activity showed she was a follower of militant accelerationism.

The videos of Williams doing Nazi salutes were first found on far-right Telegram channels by an unnamed researcher studying anti-fascism in 2020. He showed them to investigative journalism group Bellingcat, which analyzed her internet presence. The group said she used multiple accounts on Twitter and Parler under the usernames "whitepillgroyper" and "whitepillgroypr", likely references to white identitarian ideology. Her Twitter account was later deleted, but researchers had by then taken screenshots of her comments. One showed her support for Fuentes and others for Trump and Infowars founder Alex Jones. Her support for Fuentes was the strongest. In one comment she defended him from allegations that he urinated in his pants during a physical education lesson in high school. In another, she accused one America First follower of "promoting race mixing". Williams attended a rally held by Fuentes on December 12, 2020, and took photos of herself with him. She was active on Discord under the username "Riley"; the photos she sent other users there were described as pornographic. She also reportedly posted self-harming messages to someone on Discord. One video of Williams doing Nazi salutes used DJ Hyper's song "Spoiler", leading to the removal of every copy of the video for copyright infringement.

== Role in Capitol attack ==
On January 6, 2021, Williams attended the Stop the Steal rally in Washington, D.C., where Trump falsely accused the government of rigging the election. She wore a green "I'm with Groyper" T-shirt at the event and was there with her father and friends. After that, she began walking to the United States Capitol with thousands of other protesters. Williams wore a brown jacket and black tights and carried a zebra-colored handbag. Reportedly, she intentionally looked for armored protesters, specifically large men equipped with tactical vests and shields so she could direct them to break police lines. The prosecutor called Williams "among the worst of the January 6th rioters". At that time, a documentary about the attack was being filmed by British ITV News for YouTube that shows a crowd of protesters streaming into the capitol. At 20:40, Williams is seen yelling "upstairs, upstairs, upstairs" to the protesters inside the building. The documentary calls her "disciplined, focused, with a sense of urgency, directing people up a staircase". Videos of the incident show her shouting "push, push, push" at law enforcement officers guarding the Capitol rotunda. One video shows her throwing a water bottle at an officer, calling him "traitor". According to the United States Department of Justice, she entered the Capitol at approximately 2:15 p.m. using the Senate Wing Door and was in the building for about 70 minutes. She took multiple photos and videos of herself in the Capitol that were used against her in court. She and other protesters walked in the Capitol Crypt and the rotunda before breaking into Speaker of the House Nancy Pelosi's office.

Once she and the crowd entered Pelosi's office, Williams was seen putting an unknown object the size of a laptop into her zebra-colored handbag. An unidentified man wearing brown clothing standing close to her was also seen taking an HP Laptop out of the room. Multiple videos of Williams in Pelosi's office were taken. One, titled "they got the laptop", shows a man grabbing the laptop with black cloth. Another, titled "this is her office", briefly shows Williams walking inside the office. Another shows Williams telling the man "Dude, put on gloves" as he takes the laptop. After the attack ended, Williams bragged about her crime in a series of messages on a Discord server reportedly affiliated with child exploitation organization CVLT. One message read: "I stole shit from Nancy Polesi [sic]". Another said, "I took Polesis [sic] hard drives". Three others said: "I took Nancy Polesis [sic] hard drives. I don't care. Kill me"; "Like theure [sic] gonna arrest me"; and "They'll never take me alive". Williams also wrote about how she escaped the Capitol and avoided arrest. One message said: "they followed me around grabbing me while I was escaping in the crowd. I got away". When asked about Williams, her father said he drove her to Washington and that after the attack ended he drove her back to their home. He added that he had driven Williams to the Capitol with two of her friends to observe the incident and lost sight of her in the afternoon. He said he had no intention of causing any harm and was simply following the flow of the crowd.

According to the FBI, a witness saw Williams steal a "laptop computer or hard drive from Speaker Pelosi's office" with the intention of selling it to her friend in Russia who would hand it over to the Foreign Intelligence Service (SVR). The witness was later revealed to be her ex-boyfriend. He added that, for unknown reasons, she could not sell the laptop, and that she might have destroyed it. Pelosi's spokesperson Drew Hammill said the laptop was supposed to be in a conference room and that it was used "only for presentations". Williams's mother said she left their home a day after the attack, packing a bag and saying they would not see each other for two weeks. Williams deleted her Twitter, Telegram, and Parler accounts and changed her phone number. ITV News interviewed her mother before Williams's arrest through a partially open door. She confirmed that Williams had participated in the Capitol attack and said she was "very unhappy" and "sad" that video footage showed her going inside. When asked about her role in organizing the attack, she said Williams was "definitely not a leader".

== Legal issues ==
=== House arrest ===
On January 18, 2021, Williams turned herself in to authorities. Williams was arrested in central Pennsylvania and charged with disorderly conduct, violent entry, and entering a restricted building or grounds. Her court hearing was scheduled for January 19. The FBI said she was not immediately charged with theft of the laptop because that was still under investigation. On January 21, Williams was released from jail after Judge Martin Carlson allowed her to be placed on house arrest in her mother's apartment. He ordered her to wear an ankle monitor and not to go to Washington. He said he released her because she had no criminal record and finished the hearing by saying: "Your freedom, conditioned as it is by the orders that I have entered, is the result of the prevailing of the Constitution". Carlson also ordered Williams not to use the Internet and recommended she find a job that did not require it. He banned her from using smartphones, ordering her to buy a flip phone and submit to drug testing. He warned her that if she violated his orders, she would face new charges.

On that day, prosecutors charged Williams with two new felonies, aiding the theft of government property and influencing or impeding an official proceeding. Williams's lawyer Lori Ulrich said she changed her phone number because her ex-boyfriend was abusing her and that the charges against her were "overstated". On January 27, 2021, her secondary lawyer, A. J. Cramer, said her ex-boyfriend had made up the accusation about the stolen laptop. Cramer said the boyfriend lied because he was angry at Williams for "various things" and wanted revenge. In a statement to BuzzFeed News, he said Williams denied all charges against her and that police were unable to find the laptop in her apartment or car, supporting his claim. On October 7, Williams was charged with theft of the laptop and with resisting police. On August 18, 2022, Williams asked the court for her house arrest to be temporarily lifted so she could attend Renaissance Faire. The judge agreed, allowing her to attend the festival.

=== Incarceration and release ===
On November 21, 2022, the court found Williams guilty on six counts, two felonies and four misdemeanors. It was not able to convict her on two other charges (obstruction of an official proceeding and abetting the theft of the laptop) due to a hung jury. Judge Amy Berman Jackson, who was presiding over the case, said that Williams did not respect the law and ordered her to be arrested and put in jail to await sentencing. Williams was upset about the decision and said, "Fuck". Her house arrest lasted four months. In June 2022, prosecutors alleged that Williams's new fiancé had been previously arrested and incarcerated for 19 months after stealing his roommate's car and attempting to buy a gun with the intention to commit a mass shooting at a synagogue. They also said that she failed to report all of her meetings in August 2021 to her probation officer, violating her conditions. Williams's lawyers acknowledged this and called her actions "regrettable". They denied that that her fiancé had intended to commit a mass shooting, calling it an "inflammatory and unsupported allegation" unsupported by evidence.

On March 23, 2023, Williams's trial began. The prosecutors requested that she be incarcerated for seven years, accusing her of organizing a "human battering ram" against the Capitol police. Williams apologized to Jackson, calling herself a "stupid girl who was yelling at police". Jackson said Williams had acted "like a coxswain on a crew team" and that she was not "just a little waif blowing in the wind". The prosecutors said she had deleted the contents of her computer six times to hide evidence and had no remorse for her actions. Williams's lawyers said that she should be given a more lenient sentence due to her youth and gender, recommending one year and one day in prison. Jackson said she was unconvinced by their arguments, calling Williams's crimes "utterly reprehensible". She sentenced Williams to 36 months in prison and 36 months' probation, saying that if Williams showed support for Fuentes again, it would be a violation of her release conditions and she would be arrested. She was also fined a $2,000 restitution fee. Williams served her sentence at a federal prison in Hazelton, West Virginia. The whereabouts of the laptop and gavel remain unknown.

In March 2024, Williams's lawyers asked Jackson to shorten her sentence due to her alleged good behavior in prison. Jackson denied the request, saying that she was violent during the Capitol attack and because of that did not meet the requirements for sentence reduction. Ulrich said she would appeal Jackson's decision, saying that because Williams was never charged with violent crimes she was being held "accountable for things the Government did not prove". On January 20, 2025, President Trump announced a blanket pardon for all those involved in the January 6 attack. The order pardoned 1,500 defendants and commuted the sentences of 14 others. Among those pardoned was Williams, who was released from prison. Christopher Pohlhaus celebrated her pardon on social media, posting a photo of her wearing a mask and writing "Saint Riley… Congrats on your freedom. Hail victory". Ulrich said she was happy that Williams and another client were pardoned. She said Williams did not steal the laptop and that the trial made Williams become notable because anyone can learn who she is by searching the internet.

=== Defamation lawsuit ===
In 2023, Williams's ex-boyfriend sued her for defamation for her and her lawyer's comments accusing him of abuse. The lawsuit said that they had a significant amount of conflicts but there was no abuse. Her ex-boyfriend also sued Williams's friend Cyrus "Cy" Sanders, who wrote a comment on Facebook under a local news story accusing the ex-boyfriend of abusing Williams. The lawsuit also said Williams filed a spurious restraining order against her ex-boyfriend and had told police when she was arrested that she had left home because she felt "stalked and harassed" by ex-boyfriend. On October 16, 2023, Judge Douglas Hurd, who was presiding over the lawsuit, ordered Williams and Sanders each to pay the ex-boyfriend $50,000 in compensation. He also put a restraining orders on them that banned her from "publishing per se defamatory and defamatory statements" about her ex-boyfriend.

Ulrich said Williams had no lawyer to represent her in the defamation case and called Hurd's decision "very troubling". Reportedly, Sanders's Facebook post led the Daily Mail and The Epoch Times to repeat his claims. The ex-boyfriend's lawyer said his client now had the "burden of having these comments out there for the rest of his life" and that though his client felt "vindicated" that Hurd agreed with him, it upset him that Sanders's comments could still be seen online. Williams sent Hurd a letter from prison saying she was "confused" by her ex-boyfriend's lawsuit because she had not used the Internet since 2021 and called the lawsuit part of a harassment campaign by her ex-boyfriend, calling him a "criminal stalker".

== See also ==
- List of cases of the January 6 United States Capitol attack (T-Z)
- Criminal proceedings in the January 6 United States Capitol attack
- List of people granted executive clemency in the second Trump presidency
