= W.J. Estelle Unit =

Prison operated by the U.S. state of Texas

W. J. "Jim" Estelle Unit
- Location in Texas
- Location: 264 FM 3478 Huntsville, Texas 77320-3320; 30°53′22″N 95°29′08″W
- Status: Operational
- Security class: G1-G5, Administrative Segregation, Safekeeping, Substance Abuse, Geriatric, Transient Medical Facility: All levels requiring medical treatment
- Capacity: Unit: 3,148 SAFP (Substance Abuse Felony Punishment): 212 Regional Medical Facility: 120
- Opened: June 1984
- Managed by: TDCJ Correctional Institutions Division
- Warden: Kevin Smith
- Website: www.tdcj.state.tx.us/unit_directory../e2.html

W. J. "Jim" Estelle Unit (E2, originally the Ellis II Unit) also known as the Estelle Supermax Penitentiary, is a prison located on Farm to Market Road 3478 in unincorporated Walker County, Texas, United States, 10 miles (16 km) north of central Huntsville. The prison, with about 5,459 acres (2,209 ha) of space, is operated by the Texas Department of Criminal Justice. The unit, which opened in June 1984, was named after Ward James "Jim" Estelle, a former prison director of Texas. The Estelle Unit has a geriatric facility, a program for physically handicapped inmates, a program for substance abuse, a high security unit, and a regional medical facility. The Estelle High Security Unit is a supermax facility.

== History ==
The unit opened in 1984. The Estelle High Security Unit was designed in response to an increase in prison violence in the Texas prison system.

Around 1991 TDCJ planned to build a separate facility for elderly inmates. In 1995 the unit received its current name. In 1999, a prisoner named Clifford Dwayne Jones escaped by slipping one of his hands out of a pair of handcuffs and then scaling several walls. The inmate left behind his clothes and shoes, possibly to foil tracking dogs. The inmate was captured about 48 hours after his escape. Jones's escape was the first escape from the high security unit.

On May 12, 2010 Thord "Catfish" Dockray, a blind prisoner with a history of mental illness, threw urine on correctional officers. Officers ordered him to exit his cell, but he refused. The officers utilized chemical agents to try to subdue Dockray, but he continued his assault. After Dockray was subdued, medics attended to Dockray, who refused medical care. On May 13 the prisoner was found face down in his cell. The prisoner was taken to Huntsville Memorial Hospital, where he died.

As of 2010 a study by the Bureau of Justice Statistics stated that the percentage of prisoners who were sexually abused within the preceding year was 15.7% at Estelle. The BJS surveyed inmates in hundreds of state and federal prisons and county jails. Nationwide, the rate of inmates reporting sexual victimization within a prior 12-month period was 4.5 percent. The Estelle rate was the highest in the U.S.

Two correctional officers secretly allowed three inmates to fight each other on April 29, 2015 and attempted to cover up the act. They later confessed and were given prison sentences.

== Operations ==
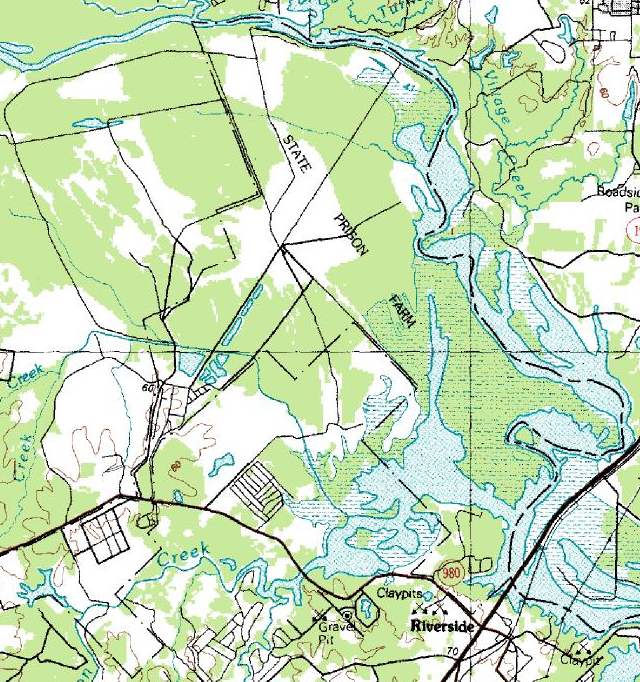
A topographic map of the land that would later contain the Estelle Unit, July 1, 1983 - U.S. Geological Survey

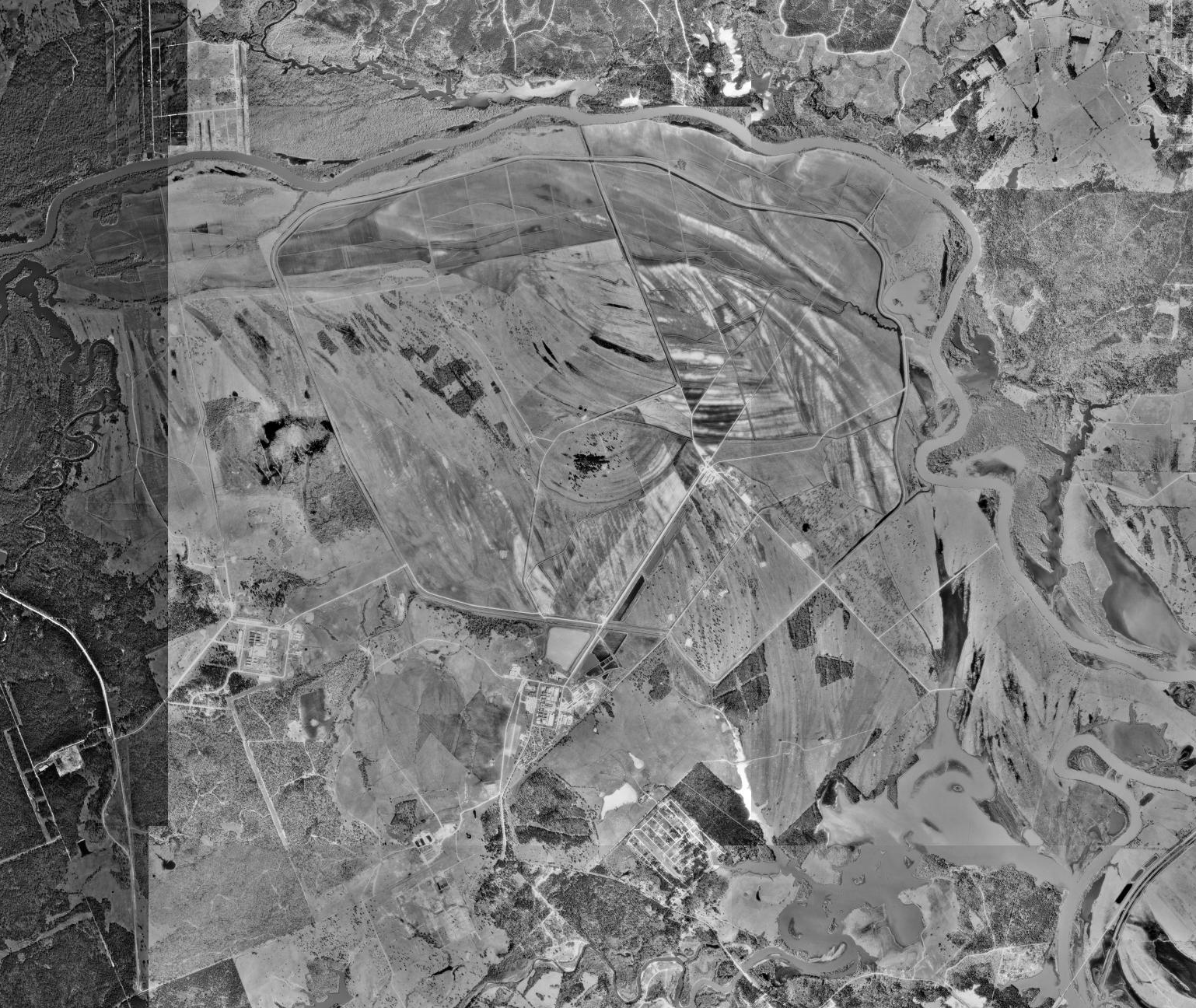
Aerial photograph of the Estelle and Ellis units, March 8, 1989, U.S. Geological Survey

The Estelle Unit is a part of a large compound, sharing space with the Ellis Unit, which is 3 miles (4.8 km) away from Estelle. The area housing the Ellis and Estelle units is wooded.

The Estelle High Security Unit is a self-contained facility north of the main Estelle prison facility. The high security unit was the first of the Texas Department of Criminal Justice's "super seg" units, which have many administrative segregation cells. The security unit houses many of the most violent male prisoners in the State of Texas. The security unit also houses prisoners who purposefully cause problems in order to escape from the general population for fear of victimization.

== Notable inmates ==
Current:

Inmate name	Register number	Status	Details
David Ray Conley III	04138107 / 02370867	Serving a life sentence without parole.	Perpetrator of the 2015 Harris County shooting in which he murdered his ex-girlfriend, Valerie Jackson, and 7 other members of her family.
Bradley Chance Cadenhead	02449471	Serving an 80 year sentence.	Founder of transnational Telegram and Discord-based sextortion network 764, sentenced for distributing child pornography.
Bernie Tiede	05931666 / 00864378	Scheduled for release in 2098. Eligible for parole in 2029.	Murdered Marjorie "Marge" Nugent in 1999.
Miguel Alvarez-Flores	16731684 / 02337494	Scheduled for release in 2057. Eligible for parole in 2037.	One of 2 perpetrators of the 2017 Murder of Genesis Cornejo-Alvarado, and the kidnapping of other girls, the case is known for the unusual involvement of Satanism.
James Kevin Pope		4,060 years in prison; Scheduled for release in 6068.	Sexual assault of three teenaged girls over two years.

Former:

- Cesar Fierro
- Steven Jay Russell
- Yaser Said
