= Blood Tribe (neo-Nazi group) =

American neo-Nazi group

- Founding leader: Christopher Pohlhaus
- Dates active: 2020–present
- Ideology: Neo-Nazism
- Political position: Far-right
- Flag

Blood Tribe (also called Blutstamm) is an American neo-Nazi group founded in 2020 by Christopher Pohlhaus, a former Marine turned tattoo artist. By 2023, members of the group began participating in anti-LGBTQ+ protests and established chapters in the United States and Canada. Founded around the same time as neo-Nazi groups The Base and Nationalist Social Club-131, Blood Tribe has described itself as an "end of the pipeline type group" in terms of its extreme radicalization.

== Background ==
After serving four years in the United States Marine Corps, Pohlhaus (also known as "Hammer") lived in San Antonio, Texas in 2020, working as a tattoo artist. He developed an online following by promoting white supremacy propaganda, producing podcasts and selling gear. He espoused a need to take "a last stand, a righteous war" against those who "call for the destruction of their birthright and posterity." By 2021, Pohlhaus had networked with other white supremacy groups and recruited followers into a membership organization, naming it Blood Tribe.

In May 2022, Pohlhaus bought 10.6 acres (4.3 ha) of land in Springfield, Maine to build an encampment where members could live and train. In October 2023, Pohlhaus sold the property to a Massachusetts man, citing local pressure. In response to the controversy, Maine enacted a law in April 2024, criminalizing paramilitary training intended to create civil disorder.

The religious views of the group appear to be a combination of "Wotanism" and Esoteric Hitlerism. Pohlhaus has a tattoo on the right side of his face which reads "Wotan" in Elder Futhark runes.

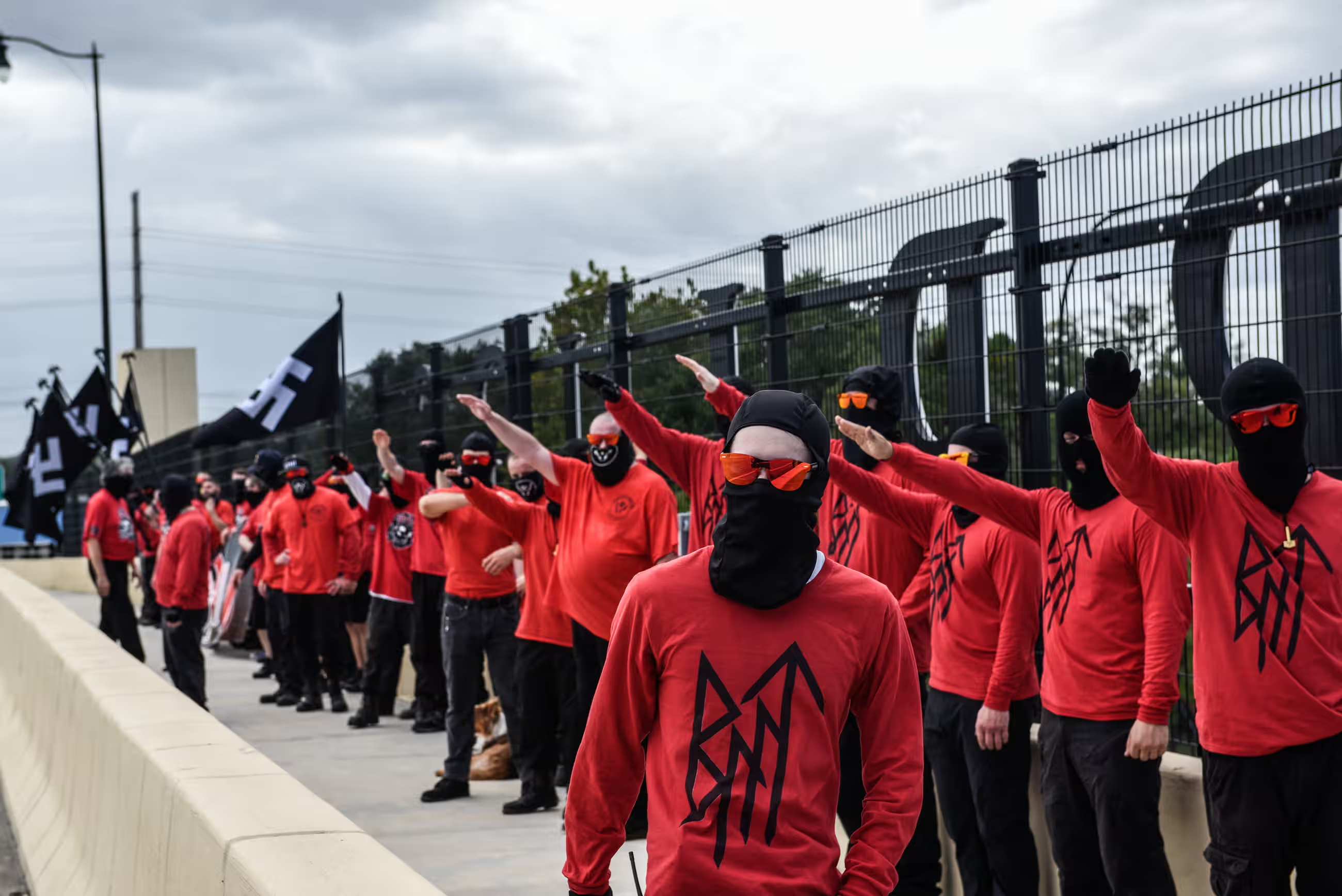
Blood Tribe demonstrating in Florida, 2025

== Activities ==
In March 2023, dozens of Blood Tribe members disrupted a Drag Queen Story Hour near Akron, Ohio, carrying weapons and chanting "Sieg Heil" while giving Nazi salutes. In May 2023, a few dozen Blood Tribe members demonstrated outside a drag event in Columbus, Ohio. Dressed in red, with most wearing black face masks and sunglasses, they carried a black flag with a swastika and a banner reading "there will be blood." They chanted slogans such as "no transgenders on our streets" and the phrase "All hail the new dawn of the Aryan sun." Blood Tribe was joined by members of Nationalist Social Club-131 at both demonstrations.

On July 29, 2023, Blood Tribe members demonstrated at a Pride in the Park event in Watertown, Wisconsin. On January 1, 2024, also in southeast Wisconsin, four Blood Tribe members projected a swastika onto the side of a dorm building and recited racist chants at the University of Wisconsin-Whitewater.

By August 2023, some Maine officials were considering prohibiting militia training camps, which raised free speech issues. State senator Joe Baldacci drafted a bill to criminalize offering training in firearms, explosives or other tactics with the intent of causing a "civil disorder."

On September 2, 2023, members of the antisemitic hate group Goyim Defense League joined Blood Tribe members for a public demonstration in Altamonte Springs, Florida. A few dozen demonstrators participated in what they called the "March of the Redshirts," waving swastika flags, performing Nazi salutes and shouting "Heil Hitler."

On November 18, 2023, Blood Tribe held a rally in Madison, Wisconsin, marching up Madison's pedestrian thoroughfare, State Street, through the University of Wisconsin-Madison to the State's Capitol Square. They remained outside the statehouse for about 30 minutes, delivering two speeches. The group chanted "They hate white men, Israel is not our friend," and "there will be blood," in addition to racial slurs targeted at bystanders, before marching off toward nearby Madison park, stopping in front of the local synagogue, Gates of Heaven, to pose with their swastika flags.

Blood Tribe held a rally in Nashville at the Tennessee State Capitol on February 17, 2024, after which participants marched down Broadway and past the City Hall, chanting "Deportation saves the nation," before departing in box trucks.

On June 8, 2024, Blood Tribe led protests at the South Dakota State Capitol in Pierre and in Deadwood, South Dakota. During the protest, the group unveiled a large Nazi flag on the state capitol steps and marched around the Governor's mansion. The group did not have an official permit for the event, and immediately left the capitol steps once told to disperse by South Dakota Highway Patrol officers. Group leader Christopher Pohlhaus disputed the claim that they were escorted off the property, reportedly writing on X: "You didn’t escort (expletive) you big silly (emoji) (emoji) we occupied your steps for the entire time we intended to be there, then slowly swaggered off to chant an entire lap around your house." In Deadwood, the group marched in the downtown area, reportedly wearing similar clothing to those who protested at the state capitol. During the Deadwood protest, two participants reportedly carried "a flag with apparent Nazi symbolism". Pohlhaus further noted on X that the protest was reportedly against South Dakota's recently adopted House Bill 1076, which provided a definition for antisemitism, and that it had been scheduled "on 57th [sic] anniversary of Israel’s attack on the USS Liberty".

On August 10, 2024, approximately twelve individuals wearing masks and red shirts marched with rifles and swastika flags in Springfield, Ohio during the course of numerous downtown community events. The alleged leader of the group who marched on August 10th, Drake R. Berentz, who identified himself as "Nathaniel Higgers" (Note: Nathaniel Higgers is an expansion of the racist gag name "Nate Higgers", a spoonerism of "hate niggers".), attended the August 27, 2024 meeting of the Springfield, Ohio City Commissioners. In his statement during the public comment period, he first challenged Mayor Rob Rue's claim that Rue had prior intelligence on the march. Next he gave a warning, "I've come to bring a word of warning. Stop what you're doing before it's too late. Crime and savagery will only increase with every Haitian you bring in, and with it public frustration and anger...". Mayor Rue interpreted the warning as a threat, canceled Berentz's remaining speaking time and asked him to leave the building. Berentz was then escorted from the building by police. In February 2025, the city sued the group for leading an intimidation campaign, including death threats, hate mail, and doxing, against residents and city officials who defended Haitian migrants.

On August 24, 2024, Blood Tribe led protests in Harrisburg, Pennsylvania, marching with red shirts and black Nazi flags. The city claimed the group did not have a permit, but did not need one to walk down the street. The city of Harrisburg condemned the protest and said it had no prior knowledge of the march and that while the group did not break any laws, they were not welcome. Mayor Wanda Williams and Police Commissioner Tom Carter said the incident was "being investigated."

On June 28, 2025, Blood Tribe disrupted the Rainbow Pride Celebration in Johnson City, Tennessee, waving a Confederate battle flag with a Swastika in the middle of the gathering while shouting at attendees. After about 45 minutes, the group marched down Main Street toward King Commons before a van picked them up.

On August 2, 2025, roughly 20 members of the Blood Tribe demonstrated outside the New Hampshire state house while holding a banner reading "Trump loves Epstein" and waving black flags with white swastikas. After the demonstration, members of the group got into a physical altercation with a bystander.

== Associated chapters ==
A Telegram post shows chapters in Illinois, Indiana, Kentucky, Maryland, Michigan, Ohio, Pennsylvania, Virginia and West Virginia.
