= Cesar Fierro =

Death row inmate in Texas

Cesar Roberto Fierro (born October 18, 1956) is a Mexican national who spent nearly 40 years on death row in Huntsville, Texas, United States, for the 1979 death of a cab driver in El Paso. His death sentence was vacated in December 2019 due to inadequate jury instructions during his trial, and he was released on parole in May 2020.

== Early life ==
Fierro grew up poor and served as the primary caretaker for his younger brother, Raul, who had a developmental disability.

== Death of Nicholas Castanon ==
In February 1979, Texas law enforcement found the body of taxi driver Nicholas Castanon. Mexican police found his cab in Ciudad Juárez. The El Paso Police Department arrested two men suspected of the crime who were later released. In late July, Geraldo Olague told Mexican police in Juárez that he and Fierro had planned to rob Castanon. He also told police that during the robbery, Fierro had shot and killed the taxi driver. The circumstances under which Olague came into contact with the police are unknown. The police in Juarez notified the El Paso police, who traveled to Juarez to arrest Fierro.

Fierro was 23 years old at the time of the shooting. He was convicted of capital murder on February 15, 1980, and sentenced to death. The criminal case against him has been controversial because Mexican police in Ciudad Juárez arrested his parents and threatened to torture them unless he confessed. Speaking about the El Paso police, Fierro said: "He told me if I signed, then they'd let them go, and if not, they were going to torture them." At Fierro's trial, Juárez and El Paso police denied any wrongdoing. No physical evidence has linked Fierro to the shooting. The conviction was based on his confession and the testimony of a "psychologically impaired" 16 year old.

== Subsequent legal proceedings ==
Judge Sharon Keller wrote the majority opinion for the Texas Court of Criminal Appeals, calling the circumstances of the coerced confession a "harmless error". In 2003, the International Court of Justice issued a preliminary injunction against the United States, ordering that Fierro not be executed while the Avena case was pending.

Fierro was imprisoned in the W.J. Estelle Unit. His sentence was vacated on December 19, 2019. Prosecutors indicated they would not seek another death sentence. Fierro was resentenced to life in prison, and released on parole on May 14, 2020. He returned to live with family in Mexico.
