= 764 (organization) =

Online sextortion network

- The logo of 764, showing an inverted pentagram and Baphomet
- Founder: Bradley Cadenhead
- Founded: 2021
- Dates active: 2021–present
- Split from: CVLT
- Country: Worldwide
- Active regions: Stephenville, Texas, United States (CVLT founded in France)
- Ideology: Misanthropy; nihilistic violent extremism
- Status: Active

764 is a decentralized, internationally operating online sextortion network. It emerged in 2021 from the CVLT network.

764 has been described as a Satanic and neo-Nazi cult by some in the media. Investigations suggest that its members' misanthropic worldview and sadistic tendencies are more significant drivers, with group dynamics playing a key role in further radicalization. Members of 764 frequently adopt the corresponding symbolism but are primarily described as being motivated by sadism.

In 2023, Bradley Cadenhead, the network's founder, was sentenced to 80 years in prison after being convicted of crimes related to the sextortion network. 764 has been described as a terror network by the United States Department of Justice (DOJ). 764 is designated as a terrorist group by Canada and New Zealand, which considers it as part of the Order of Nine Angles.

== History ==
764 was founded in 2021 by Bradley Chance Cadenhead. At the age of 15, school dropout Cadenhead (alias "Felix") learned techniques of exploiting minors and sextortion on a Discord server named CVLT and subsequently founded 764. In the game Minecraft, Cadenhead met an unknown person who assisted him in establishing 764. The 764 network is primarily active on Discord and Telegram, and to some extent on the gaming platforms Roblox and Minecraft. It is also publicly active on online forums. Its members are involved in systematic sexual, physical, and psychological abuse of minors through sextortion and other practices and in distributing child pornography and depictions of violence. Victims are selected from the 9- to 17-year-old age group, with a preference for children from marginalized backgrounds or with mental health issues.

Cadenhead was bullied during his school years. A classmate called him an "easy target". In his early teens, Cadenhead suffered multiple psychological breakdowns and was isolated. He told probation officers that he stopped caring about anything and, after dropping out of school at 15, withdrew to his room. He founded the 764 online network and named it after the first three digits of the ZIP Code of his hometown, Stephenville, Texas. Cadenhead had been noticeably disruptive as a student. At age ten, he was fascinated by graphic online content depicting murder and torture. His assistant principal alerted authorities about Cadenhead, leading to an investigation into terrorist threats. Despite disciplinary measures, Cadenhead continued to use school computers to draw images of school shootings.

Cadenhead extorted minors through sextortion or coerced them by threatening actions such as swatting attacks. He forced his victims, among other things, to produce child pornography and engage in animal cruelty and self-harm. Cadenhead's Discord accounts were typically banned within about a day, but he repeatedly created new ones. A Discord spokesperson told The Washington Post that the company's moderation system primarily relied on user reports. When Discord learned of their illegal activities, it banned Cadenhead's accounts. Out of concern about retaliatory actions by 764 members, the spokesperson requested anonymity. After a house search on August 25, 2021, Cadenhead was arrested, and on May 16, 2023, he was convicted of possessing child pornographic files. He was sentenced to 80 years in prison and is currently imprisoned in the Estelle Unit in Huntsville, Texas.

Cadenhead's behavioral therapist said during the trial that Cadenhead needed psychological treatment rather than imprisonment. After reviewing video evidence from Cadenhead's computer and listing the seven deadly sins, the presiding judge, Jason Cashon, addressed Cadenhead directly, saying, "There is something horribly wrong with you [...] Horribly."

764 is designated as a terrorist organization by Canada and New Zealand, which considers it part of the Order of Nine Angles.

=== Arrests of leaders ===
On April 29, 2025, the U.S. Department of Justice reported the arrest of two key members of a 764 subgroup. The 20-year-old Prasan Nepal (alias "Trippy") was arrested on April 22, 2025, in North Carolina, and the 21-year-old Leonidas Varagiannis (alias "War") was apprehended on April 28 in Greece. An international arrest warrant was issued against Varagiannis, and his extradition to the U.S. has been requested, which he is attempting to resist, arguing that Greek authorities should have jurisdiction due to his residence in Greece.

According to the Justice Department, the two suspects were accused not only of leading a 764 subgroup on an encrypted messenger but also of being centrally involved in the production and distribution of child pornography. According to FBI director Kash Patel, they recruited group members and created a guide for producing such material. If convicted in the U.S., Varagiannis and Nepal face life imprisonment, according to the U.S. Department of Defense.

According to the Global Network on Extremism & Technology (GNET), the 764 network was officially considered dissolved upon the arrest of Cadenhead and other key figures. But the network has fragmented into subgroups such as 676, CVLT, Court, Kaskar, Harm Nation, Leak Society, and H3ll. GNET notes a continuity of personnel and assumes that the 764 network persists in these splinter groups.

=== The Community ===
When aggregated, the people surrounding these groups are commonly called "the com", short for "the community". Researchers and law enforcement estimated in 2024 that "the com" includes hundreds of people who engage in sextortion, child sexual exploitation, extortion and harassment using various cybercriminal tactics such as swatting or doxing, as well as thousands engaged in other cybercriminal activities.

=== Notable cases ===
One of the first notable cases was in May 2024, when a 14-year-old boy stabbed an elderly woman in her eighties in Hässelby, Stockholm, Sweden. He was convicted by the Swedish court of attempted murder and sentenced to juvenile detention. According to an investigation, he was linked to and active on communities associated with 764.

== Ideological influences ==
The 764 network adopted the tactics of CVLT, a previous sextortion group, expanding sextortion to include additional forms of abuse, such as coercion into animal cruelty.

It has been connected to Nazism and right-wing extremism and violence. Its ideology promotes amorality and teachings aimed at "transcending" moral and societal norms. Joshua Caleb Sutter and his Tempel ov Blood, a group affiliated with the neo-Nazi satanist group the Order of Nine Angles, has heavily influenced 764's ideology and symbolism.

In April 2024, No Lives Matter distanced itself from the 764 network, saying that it advocates an ideology that 764 should follow. The previous alliance was disrupted due to 764's connections to Satanism and pedophilia. Since breaking from 764, NLM has sharpened its ideological focus and now presents itself as a misanthropic network that continues to endorse murder.

== Sextortion ==
The network is most present on Discord and Telegram. It also operates on various gaming platforms, where perpetrator tactics include contacting minors via the in-game chat, masquerading as minors, and offering in-game currency to establish trust. Network members have also initiated contact with minors on social media platforms such as Instagram, TikTok, and Snapchat. Once contact is established, members may shift the communication to forums like Discord or Telegram before escalating abuse and facilitating extortion.

Its members try to obtain compromising data from their victims, often in the form of nude images. They use various methods, such as hacking, sextortion, and blackmail, to acquire this data, which is then used for extortion. Some victims are coerced into self-harm, including cases where children were forced to carve their tormentor's online nickname into their skin, which is called "cutsigning" or "fansigning" (a form of branding to show their subjugation by the group). Other children were manipulated into flushing their heads in toilets, torturing and killing their pets, attacking their siblings, killing themselves, or carrying out mass shootings. Several cases of attempted or completed suicides among victims are documented, some deliberately induced by the perpetrators.

The German Federal Criminal Police Office has warned about these perpetrators' methods. A Canadian victim of 764 described feeling loved by the perpetrators and said, "I was a lost soul and found serenity and comfort in the familiarity of the abuse."

The perpetrators' motives are cited as sadism and misanthropy, though extorted child pornography has also been sold on the darknet. The FBI identified minors aged eight to seventeen as the target group. Additionally, members of the LGBTQ+ community, ethnic minorities, and people with mental health issues, particularly depression and suicidality, are focal points for the perpetrators.

== Police warnings and activities ==
The U.S. Federal Bureau of Investigation (FBI) classified the 764 network as a "tier one" threat, the highest danger category, assessing it as a threat to national and economic security. In September 2023, the FBI published their first bulletin warning the public of the network. Law enforcement authorities and affected parties have repeatedly stated that platform operators are responsible for taking more decisive action against dangers to underage users. While Roblox had already restricted certain content and features for users under 17 since 2023, the company implemented additional safety measures in November, including automated chat monitoring and restrictions on the use of the chat function for underage users. In July 2025, age verification via facial scanning was introduced.

In July 2024, RCMP Newfoundland and Labrador (Canada) published a news release warning parents of various groups, after an anonymous tip of a child being targeted online was linked to the network. Another news release reminding the public of the groups was published by RCMP a month later.

In August 2024, U.S. Senator Mark Warner (D-VA) pressed Discord regarding "[their] failure to safeguard minors and stop the proliferation of violent predatory groups" in response to the FBI bulletin regarding 764. In May 2025, FBI director Kash Patel called the group "deeply disturbing". According to media reports from May 2025, approximately 250 investigations related to the 764 network were being conducted in the US spanning all 55 FBI field offices. In the US, terrorism laws are sometimes applied to members of the 764 network. These laws are also used against perpetrators operating from abroad who commit crimes with impacts in the USA. In such cases, extradition requests are made.

In 2025, the Australian Federal Police (AFP) launched a task force to disrupt and dismantle groups like 764. In June 2026, the AFP attended a meeting of Five Eyes in London, at which sadistic online exploitation was a high priority. The AFP also engages through Europol. An Australian investigative report aired in October 2026 revealed that children had been targeted by international groups on Roblox and encouraged to move to other platforms such by groups including 764.

== Incidents ==
According to Der Spiegel in March 2024, 764-related arrests had been made for child pornography, kidnapping and murder in at least eight countries, including two men in Germany. The FBI estimated that thousands of children have been victims of 764 and similar groups. The Australian Federal Police said in November 2024 that they were intensifying efforts to disrupt networks linked to 764.

=== 2021 ===
- A 22-year-old member of CVLT, Kaleb Christopher Merritt of Spring, Texas, kidnapped and raped a 12-year-old girl in Virginia, United States. He was convicted and sentenced to 350 years in prison. Cadenhead's splinter group also leveraged animal torture, incest, rape, self-harm, and bestiality from their victims.
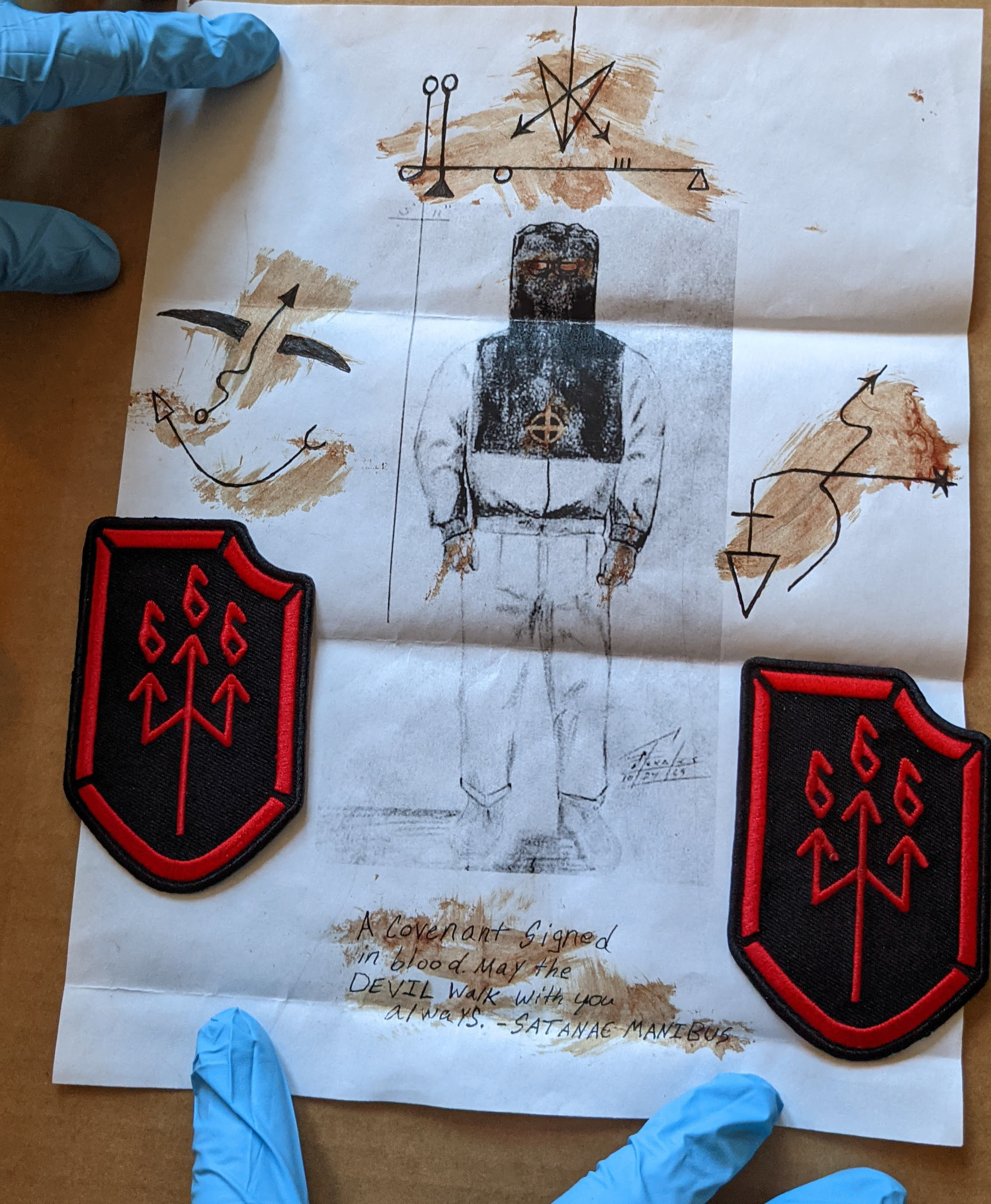
- The "covenant signed in blood" found in 764 member Angel Almeida's New York home
  22-year-old Angel Almeida of Queens, New York, United States, was arrested for his involvement in the network and possession of a firearm while being a felon. Found inside Almeida's house was a bloodied piece of paper with a sketch of the Zodiac Killer alongside runic symbols and other memorabilia of the Order of Nine Angles. Almeida's arrest tipped off law enforcement on the 764 network.
- An American man who was stranded in Kyrgyzstan died by self-immolation for an audience on Discord. He had been encouraged to broadcast his suicide by a 15-year-old Eastern European girl he met online who herself had links to 764.

=== 2023 ===
- 17-year-old Nino Luciano H., known as "Tobbz", livestreamed himself attacking an 82-year-old man in March 2022, and two weeks later he livestreamed his fatal stabbing of a 74-year-old woman, whom he believed to be Roma, on a 764-affiliated Discord server. This was allegedly so he could "prove himself" as a member of the "Maniac Murder Cult" (MKU). He was sentenced to 14 years in prison in August 2023.
- 17-year-old founder Bradley Chance Cadenhead pled guilty to nine counts of possession of child pornography. An Erath County judge sentenced Cadenhead to an 80-year state prison sentence.
- The founder of the CVLT group that inspired Cadenhead was charged with torture and sextortion by the Paris Departmental Criminal Court. He pled guilty to the charges, and the case was referred to the Paris Court of Assizes for a jury trial.
- After Cadenhead's arrest in August 2021, the group was led by a 21-year-old from Timișoara, Romania, named Francesco (nicknamed "Riley"). He was sentenced to three years in prison in August 2023 for the production of child pornography, with the Romanian DIICOT citing the fact that he "subscribed to antisocial values from the Maniac Murder Cult".

=== 2024 ===
- The Brazilian Federal Police arrested two teenage leaders of a suspected splinter group in Ananindeua, Pará, and Tabatinga, Amazonas, Brazil. The operation led by the federal police, codenamed "Discórdia", carried out seven search warrants in five Brazilian states.
- In January 2024, 47-year-old member Richard Anthony Reyna Densmore of Kaleva, Michigan, United States, was indicted on federal child pornography charges. Densmore, who was known as "Rabid" and ran a splinter group named "Sew3r", was later sentenced to 30 years in prison after pleading guilty. Following Densmore's sentencing, Matthew G. Olsen of the Justice Department's National Security Division said that the group sought to do "unspeakable harm to children to advance their goals of destroying civilized society, fomenting civil unrest, and ultimately collapsing government institutions."
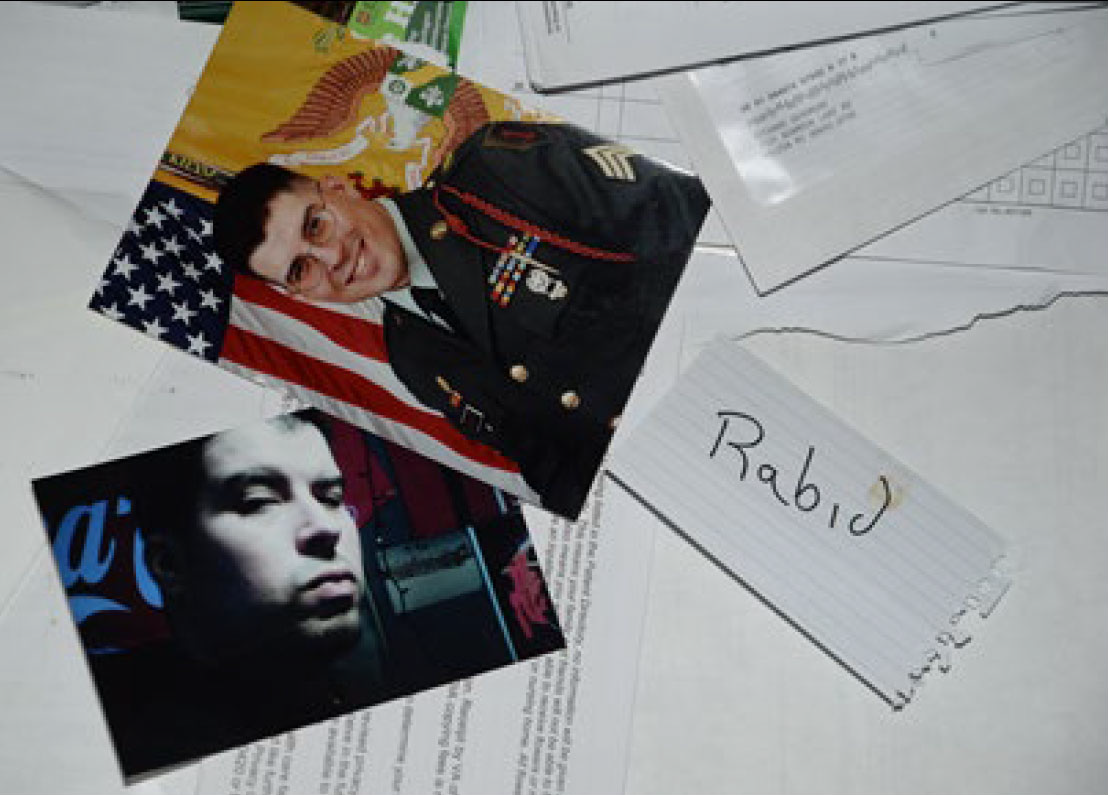
  Items recovered during a search warrant at Richard "Rabid" Densmore's home
- Cameron Finnigan, a 19-year-old from Horsham, UK, known as "Acid", was arrested, and in January 2025 pled guilty to encouraging suicide, possessing a terrorism manual, and possessing indecent images of a child. Finnigan was subsequently sentenced to six years in jail. At the time of sentencing, the BBC reported that at least four British teenagers had been arrested in connection with the activities of the group.

=== 2025 ===
- The Antioch school shooter, Solomon Henderson, made references to 764 and similar groups in social media posts before the attack.
- A member of the wider 764 network, Jairo Jaime Tinajero, pled guilty to various counts, among them racketeering conspiracy, possession of CSAM, and conspiracy to murder. Tinajero was a member of the splinter group 8884 and had groomed several minors to obtain CSAM from them; he also conspired with others to kill one of the minors.
- 764 member Jack Rocker of Tampa, Florida, was sentenced to seven years in prison for possession of child pornography in the form of 8,300 videos and images. He was also ordered to pay restitution to his victims.
- A 14-year-old with ties to 764 and NLM was convicted in Swedish court for stabbing a 55-year-old woman in Borås. As he was a minor, he faced no punishment, but was ordered to pay 160,000 kronor in damages to the woman.
- The University of Las Palmas de Gran Canaria received a bomb threat with a manifesto claiming to be part of the group 764.
- Ronndog Elliot Keefe from Hastings, New Zealand, was sentenced to five years and four months in prison. Authorities claim that alongside soliciting minors and distributing child pornography, Keefe wanted to be seen as an "edge lord" by 764 and planned to commit a mass killing at a mosque or shopping mall. Keefe pled guilty to 13 charges, including knowingly distributing child exploitation material, possessing objectionable publications, exposing a young person to indecent material, threatening to kill, and failing to comply with a computer search.

=== 2026 ===
- The Royal Canadian Mounted Police (RCMP) issued a peace bond on a youth in New Brunswick, said to have been involved with 764.
- A lawsuit was brought against Discord by family members of an individual, who they say was coerced by 764 to commit suicide in Pierce County, Washington.
- On July 1, during a senate hearing in the Congress of the Philippines, Senator Risa Hontiveros said that 764 may have influenced the two underage suspects of the 2026 Tacloban school shooting, which killed 3 people and injured 20. She further stated that the FBI characterized the group as one that encourages victims to create graphic pornography and harm themselves and pets.
- On July 9, Alexis Chavez, the leader of 8884 (a splinter group of 764) was convicted of crimes related to the sexual exploitation of children. He was sentenced to 40 years in prison. His activity with 764 began in 2022 and included animal torture, attempting to coerce children into self-harm, and distribution and possession of child sexual materials.
- On August 19, 764 member Kyle William Spitze, 27, of Friendsville, Tennessee, received a 77-year sentence for production of child sexual abuse material, abetting the distribution of animal crushing videos, and possessing with intent to view. Spitze had been arrested in 2024 after images and videos of two female children he sexually abused and forced to self-harm were found on his cellphone, one of whom was forced to carve the word "crim" into her body, in reference to his online alias "Criminal". Prosecutors said two of Spitze's child victims died by suicide and that Spitze had claimed to have groomed over 2,600 children over the internet. Spitze also forced one of his victims to cut herself "as deep as she could" and to kill a chicken and film it, and had threatened her by saying he would kill her and saying he would leak compromising videos of her. In 2023, Spitze provoked his mother's boyfriend into shooting him in the ear, after which the boyfriend fatally shot himself. Spitze was arrested days after he found his mother unconscious in a pool of blood and, instead of calling emergency services, filmed it and posted it online. He has been called the "most prolific member" of 764.

== See also ==
- Atomwaffen Division – International neo-Nazi network
- Blue Whale Challenge – Social network cyberbullying phenomenon
- Hurtcore – Extreme form of child pornography
- Livestreamed crime – Crime that is livestreamed on the internet
- Momo Challenge hoax – Internet hoax
