= Nihilistic violent extremism =

Law enforcement term

Nihilistic violent extremism (NVE) is a term used by law enforcement agencies to refer to extremism and violence lacking an ideological motivation and instead being motivated by a misanthropic or nihilistic worldview and generalized hatred for society. It is closely associated with groups and subcultures such as 764, No Lives Matter, and the True Crime Community. Despite nihilistic violent extremism's characterization as being unmotivated by genuine ideology, groups or individuals falling under this umbrella may adopt the aesthetics or tactics of, or have sympathies for, other extremist ideologies like neo-Nazism, the variant of Satanism associated with the Order of Nine Angles, and militant accelerationism. It is also closely associated with sexual misconduct, such as solicitation, production, or possession of child pornography, and sextortion, as well as general violence.

== History ==
Nihilistic violent extremism was originally coined by the Federal Bureau of Investigation in the United States, who often used the term in search warrant and indictment filings to describe individuals, often but not always associated with groups such as 764 and No Lives Matter. These individuals were being charged, searched, or found guilty of crimes or attempts at one which were alleged or confirmed to have been motivated by attempts at taking down major societal institutions, attempting to cause political and societal chaos, or otherwise committing violent acts somewhere without a cohesive ideological worldview involving belief systems such as religion and ethnic conflict. Its first use appeared in March 2025.

Following the assassination of Charlie Kirk in 2025, the term has since increasingly been used publicly in dialogue by law enforcement circles regarding criminal investigations of extremist crimes in the United States. The most notable law enforcement official to invoke the term was FBI director Kash Patel during an oversight committee in the Senate in 2025. During the committee, he claimed that NVEs were a rising terrorist threat and that the FBI had "over 1,700 investigations" dedicated to nihilistic terrorism, which he claimed was a "300% increase" compared to 2024. Patel has also claimed that NVEs make up "a large chunk" of domestic terrorism cases in the United States.

According to Felix Neumann, a researcher at the Konrad-Adenauer-Stiftung, "Larpercore" is one of several subcultures within the "Edgesphere", a collection of shifting and overlapping extreme internet subcultures that emerged between 2018 and 2020. Other elements of the "Edgesphere" include incels, true crime communities, gore networks, and foodists. Neumann also identifies the Com network as part of this environment, noting that nihilistic violence can develop within these subcultures and spread between them.

== Reception ==
The term has been criticized by experts on the subject for being frequently misused and for its definition. The Heritage Foundation, a conservative think tank, suggested the FBI class transgender activism as nihilistic violent extremism, resulting in criticism from the LGBTQ rights organization GLAAD. According to the LGBTQ magazine Them, in 2025, "two anonymous national security experts claimed that the FBI intended to categorize trans people as 'Nihilistic Violent Extremists'".

Intelligence analyst Bennett Clifford was critical of the term, writing that it was based on a fallacy, combined multiple disparate currents with different considerations, and that it should be retired. He wrote that it was "analytically suspect, based on a faulty definition, a contradiction in terms, a category error, and several fallacies about the nature of the modern threat actor networks to which "NVE" was intended to pertain". Scholar Spencer Sunshine wrote that the term was often misused, but that it captured some of the "mood" of the "current" extremist ecosystem.

== See also ==
- Zhang Xianzhong § Modern legacy
