= No Lives Matter =

Misanthropic group

- Logo of NLM, which features a 1970s police sketch of Joseph James DeAngelo, then known as the "East Area Rapist"
- Ideology: Militant accelerationism; Antihumanism; Misanthropy; Nihilistic violent extremism
- Part of: Maniac Murder Cult

No Lives Matter (NLM) is a misanthropic organization that advocates for violence, terrorism, and the destruction of humanity. Its core principles are radical nihilism and antihumanism. The organization gained notoriety for its actions in the form of attacks. They have committed various attacks, such as stabbing, smashing car windows, and arson.

NLM also released violent manifestos explaining their philosophy, as well as advice on assault and murder.

NLM has been described as the English-language offshoot of Maniac Murder Cult (MKU), with a focus on recruiting members from the English-speaking world. In July 2024, NLM referred to a collaboration with the Mordwaffen Division, a European neo-Nazi group. Until May 2024, NLM had an alliance with 764, but this had ended due to 764's involvement with child sexual abuse material. NLM indicated that their only allies are Satanic Front and the MKU.

In its propaganda, the group referred to itself as "children of fire" whose mission was to kill "mundane" people. The group used instant messaging platforms such as Telegram and Discord. On Telegram, NLM distributed crime manuals and provided information on bombs, disguises, selecting victims, recruiting new members, and evading justice.

According to the Institute for Strategic Dialogue, NLM and the "True Crime Community" has been linked to at least nine school shooting plots.

== History ==
On August 21, 2024, the New Jersey Office of Homeland Security and Preparedness released a threat assessment. According to the report, NLM was "[...] looking for more soldiers to join our ranks, true misanthropic individuals", and they "only accept people that do irl [in real life] action". One precondition for acceptance into NLM is the practice of self-harm in the form of "[...] deep bloody cuts that represent us [NLM]".

In 2025, the founder of No Lives Matter, named as "Justin B", operating under the alias Cxrpse, was arrested in the Netherlands.

== See also ==
- 764 (organization)
- CVLT (organization)
- Order of Nine Angles
- Hurtcore
- True Crime Community
