= Sextortion =

Non-physical forms of coercion to extort sexual favors from the victim

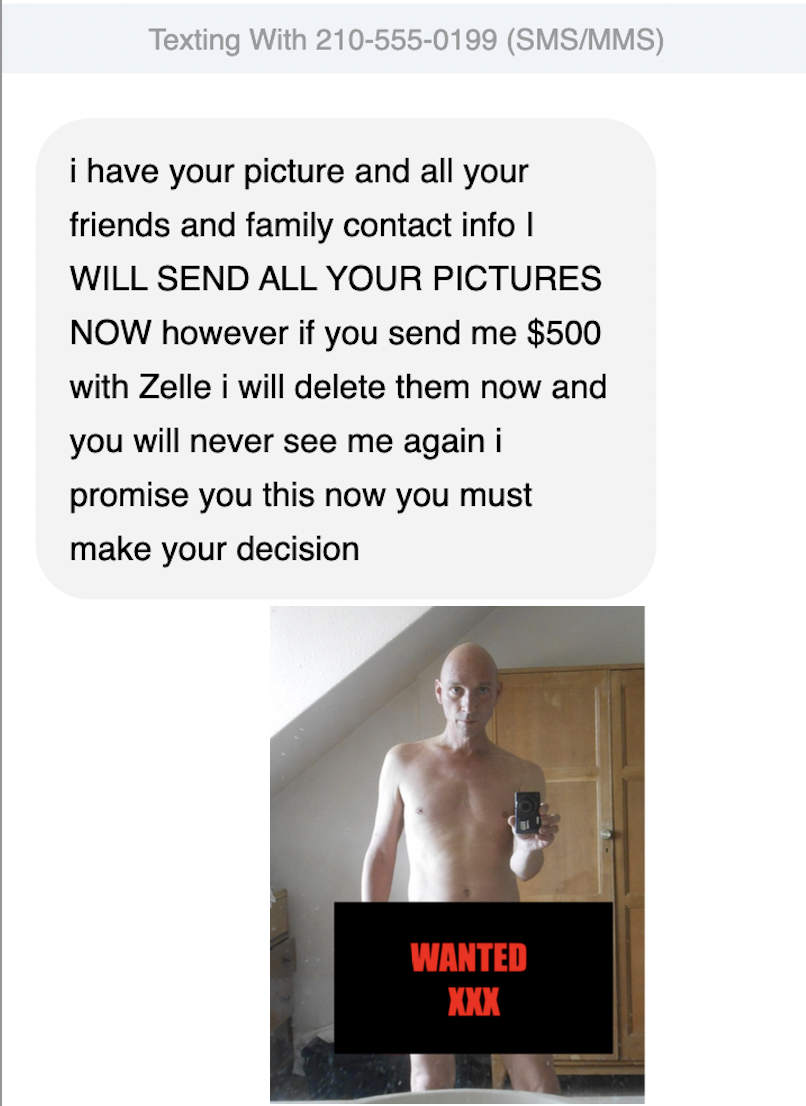
A mockup example of a sextortion text message. After obtaining naked photographs or videos of the victim, the scammer then threatens the publication of these pictures or to send them to close friends and family members. A demand of money is then made, though usually the scam is either a bluff (e.g. the scammer never intended to publish them) or the pictures/videos are published regardless even if the money is sent.

Sextortion (a portmanteau of sex and extortion) employs non-physical forms of coercion to extort sexual favors from the victim. Sextortion refers to the broad category of sexual exploitation in which abuse of power is the means of coercion, as well as to the category of sexual exploitation in which threatened release of sexual images or information is the means of coercion.

As used to describe an abuse of power, sextortion is a form of corruption in which people entrusted with power – such as government officials, judges, educators, law enforcement personnel, and employers – seek to extort sexual favors in exchange for something within their authority to grant or withhold. Examples of such abuses of power include: government officials who request sexual favors to obtain licenses or permits, teachers who trade good grades for sex with students, and employers who make providing sexual favors a condition of obtaining a job or getting promoted.. A Transparency International report on sextortion noted some challenges in prosecuting sextortion under existing anti-corruption and gender-based violence legal frameworks.

Sextortion also refers to a form of blackmail in which sexual information or images are used to extort money or sexual favors from the victim; the National Center for Missing and Exploited Children (NCMEC) uses the term financial sextortion for cases in which the offender demands money from a child. Social media and text messages are often the source of the sexual material and the threatened means of sharing it with others. An example of this type of sextortion is where people are extorted with a nude image of themselves they shared on the Internet through sexting. They are later coerced into giving money, or performing sexual acts with the person doing the extorting or are coerced into posing or performing sexually on camera, thus producing hardcore pornography. This method of blackmail is also frequently used to out LGBT people who keep their true sexual orientation private.

A video highlighting the dangers of sextortion has been released by the National Crime Agency in the UK to educate people, especially given the fact that blackmail of a sexual nature may cause humiliation to a sufficient extent to cause the victim to take their own life, in addition to other efforts to educate the public on the risks of sextortion.

== Webcam blackmail ==
Sextortion using webcam content often involves a cybercriminal posing as someone else – such as an attractive person – initiating communication of a sexual nature with the victim (about 95% of victims are male). Often, the cybercriminal simply shows the victim a pre-recorded video of a performer from a cybersex webcam site which they are sufficiently familiar with, then messages the victim at points in the video where the performer appears to be typing on the keyboard, to give the illusion that the performer in the video is messaging them. The victim is then persuaded to undress in front of a webcam, and may also be persuaded to engage in sexual behaviour, such as masturbation. The video is recorded by the cybercriminal, who then reveals their true intent and demands money or other services (such as more explicit images of the victim, in cases of online predation), and threatening to publicly release the video to video services like YouTube and send it to family members and friends of the victim if they do not comply. Sometimes threats to make false allegations of paedophilia against the victim are made as well. This is known as webcam blackmail. An increase in webcam blackmails have been reported, and it affects both young and old, male and female alike.

== History ==
The term appeared in 1942 in "American thesaurus of slang with supplement and complete reference book of colloquial speech" on Page no. 340. An early use of the term appears in print in 1950 in California.

Since early 2009, The Institute for Responsible Online and Cell-Phone Communication (iroc2.org) began warning the public about the trend of "Sextortion" via live events and websites including www.sextortion.org. This is a trend that grew based on the birth and growth of the trend known as "sexting" whereby compromising images and videos were being shared by individuals without a real understanding of the short and long term consequences of sharing "private" content on digital tools designed for sharing.

In 2009, the International Association of Women Judges (IAWJ), in partnership with the Association of Women Judges in Bosnia and Herzegovina, the Philippine Women Judges Association, and the Tanzania Women Judges Association, and with funding from the Government of the Netherlands, launched a three-year program on "Stopping the Abuse of Power through Sexual Exploitation: Naming, Shaming, and Ending Sextortion." Presentations on sextortion were made to judges attending the 2010 and 2012 Biennial World Conferences of the IAWJ and to NGOs attending the 2011 and 2012 meetings of the UN Commission on the Status of Women.

There are also scientific studies describing the prevalence of sextortion in Europe, etc. in the Czech Republic (2017).

In China, there are cases of sextortion as part of predatory lending to students.

In 2022, the Canadian Centre for Child Protection noted a tripling of cases compared to previous years and a change away from female victims being sextorted for images towards young male victims being sextorted for money.

Between 2021 and 2023, the U.S. saw a 7,200% rise in sextortion attempts according to data by the National Center for Missing and Exploited Children (NCMEC). According to NCMEC, it received nearly 100 financial sextortion reports a day in 2024. In 2025 the daily average rose to 137, an increase of 37% on the previous year.

== See also ==
- Advance-fee scam – Type of confidence trick fraud
  - Pig butchering scam – Type of investment fraud
  - Romance scam – Confidence trick using romantic intentions
- Cybercrime – Type of crime based in computer networks
  - Internet fraud – Fraud or deception using the Internet
  - Phishing – Form of social engineering
  - Social engineering (security) – Psychological manipulation in information security
- Cryptocurrency and crime
  - High-yield investment program – Type of Ponzi scheme
  - Pump and dump – Form of securities fraud
