= Transparency report =

Annual company report on user data

A transparency report is a statement issued semiannually or annually by a company or government, which discloses a variety of statistics related to requests for user data, records, or content.

Transparency reports generally disclose how frequently and under what authority governments have requested or demanded data or records over a certain period of time. This form of corporate transparency allows the public to discern how much user information governments have requested through search warrants, court orders, emergency requests, subpoenas, etc. Additionally, companies report data related to requests for user information regarding national security matters, including national security letters and FISA Requests. In 2010, Google was the first company to release a transparency report, with Twitter following in 2012. Additional companies began releasing transparency reports in light of the Edward Snowden leaks in 2013, and the number of companies issuing them has increased rapidly ever since. Additionally, the United States Intelligence Community began releasing their Annual Statistical Transparency Report in 2013, in an attempt to raise public opinion following the leaks. Today, transparency reports are issued by a variety of technology and communications companies, including Google, Microsoft, Verizon, AT&T, Twitter, Apple, Dropbox, Facebook, Yahoo, Uber, Amazon, T-Mobile, Discord, Reddit, and CloudFlare. Transparency reporting has also expanded to cover content moderation practices, including platforms' responses to child sexual exploitation and abuse, with industry bodies such as the Technology Coalition and intergovernmental organizations including the OECD tracking and benchmarking these disclosures across platforms. As of July 2021, 88 companies have provided transparency reports. Due to the optional nature of transparency reporting, some companies' transparency reports include information related to the government's involvement in copyright takedowns, while others do not. Critics claim that these discrepancies in various companies' reports result in confusion rather than clarification regarding government requesting and censorship practices, and many agree that systematic transparency reporting practices should be implemented across every company that receives requests for user information or takedown notices. Additionally, companies are required by the government to report the number of national security requests they received in bands of 500 (0–499) or 1000 (0–999). Several companies and advocacy groups have lobbied the U.S. government to change this policy and allow the exact number of national security requests to be released, and Twitter is raising this issue in the ongoing legal battle, Twitter v. Garland.

== Purpose ==
Transparency reports are primarily provided to shed light on surveillance practices of government law enforcement in order to enable stakeholders to understand the operations of the company, to help identify areas where companies and organizations can improve policies and practices, and to serve as a tool for advocacy and public change. Access Now claims that transparency reports are "one of the strongest ways for technology companies to disclose threats to user privacy and free expression," and are tools vital to safeguard against abuses of power.

Companies such as Google, Microsoft, Yahoo, Facebook, and Twitter release transparency reports, all of which list the type and number of government data requests each company receives. The U.S. government will not, however, permit companies to report exact numbers for national security requests or the number of requests that came under the Foreign Intelligence Surveillance (FISA) Section 702, Patriot Act Section 215, or national security letters. Instead, they have to aggregate the numbers or provide a range. And that's even if the government permits a company to publish that data. Google may publish national security letter information, but not FISA information. Facebook may publish FISA information, but it must lump such data in with NSL information. As a result, consumers cannot see the true figure for total government data requests. Critics of this policy, such as the Electronic Frontier Foundation, argue that there is no clear national security justification for blocking entities from releasing this information.

=== Legal Request Increases Over Time ===
==== Google ====
Google's latest (10th) transparency report indicates that the government demands for data are increasing in recent years. This report shows demands from government in the first six months of 2014, and the firm said that it includes demands made under the US Foreign Intelligence Surveillance Act (FISA) and through National Security Letters (NSLs). "FISA and NSL demands have increased by 15 percent during the six months, according to the firm, and by 150 percent over the 10 reports and the five year reporting period. That's globally. In the US the figures for the same period are 19 percent and 250 percent." Google legal director Richard Salgado accepted that the government has to fight crime and deal with threats, but the opposition of data demands need to be considered as well. "This increase in government demands comes against a backdrop of ongoing revelations about government surveillance programs. Despite these revelations, we have seen some countries expand their surveillance authorities in an attempt to reach service providers outside their borders," he said. "Governments have a legitimate and important role in fighting crime and investigating national security threats. To maintain public confidence in both government and technology, we need legislative reform that ensures surveillance powers are transparent, reasonably scoped by law, and subject to independent oversight." The report shows that the US makes the most demands for Google users' data, and Google said that it made 12,539 requests that affected some 22,000 accounts. It added that it provided data in 84 percent of cases.

In the UK it said there were 1,535 requests covering 1,991 users or accounts, and Google provided data for 72 percent of the requests.

=== Yahoo ===
The latest Yahoo transparency report was released on 25 September 2014. The report states that 30,511 users were affected by 18,594 government data requests, whereas 57,324 accounts were affected by 29,470 government requests. However, both of these figures do not include those secret requests sent by the FISA court. During the last six months from July 1, 2013, to December 31, 2013, it received between 0 and 1998 FISA requests for user data, affecting up to 54,997 users (including national security letters). Comparing to the first sixth months from January 1, 2013 to June 30, 2013, 32,997 accounts was affected. As we can see from the figures, although the total number of data request drop, the number of data request approved from the FISA court have increased significantly. Overall, 41 percent of accounts affected by government data requests came from requests made by the U.S. government.

== Criticisms ==
There is much debate surrounding the efficacy of transparency reporting. Some critics argue that the optional nature of mere quantities of requests may mislead consumers, since most entities have little control over the number of requests they receive, the breadth of the requests they receive, or even the number of requests they ultimately comply with.

=== Discrepancies in quality of reports ===
Transparency reports play a vital role in promoting greater accountability and openness, but they are not immune to data discrepancies. These discrepancies can arise from a variety of sources, including human error, technical glitches, misinterpretation of data, and inconsistencies in reporting. When data discrepancies occur, they can significantly erode the effectiveness of transparency reports, as stakeholders may question the accuracy and reliability of the information presented.

==== Known discrepancies ====
- Comcast 2020 Criminal Demands Total
- Facebook 2018 Net Users Affected

== Conflicts between government and company ==
In June 2013, Google asked the Department of Justice for permission to disclose details about the number of FISA requests it receives. As a result, Microsoft, Yahoo, and Facebook followed suit immediately. However, the Department of Justice refused those requests, and they only provide the companies with a heavily redacted version of their arguments. Here's what Google legal director Richard Salgado had to say about FISA requests: "We want to go even further. We believe it's your right to know what kinds of requests and how many each government is making of us and other companies. However, the U.S. Department of Justice contends that U.S. law does not allow us to share information about some national security requests that we might receive. Specifically, the U.S. government argues that we cannot share information about the requests we receive (if any) under the Foreign Intelligence Surveillance Act. But you deserve to know."

"Our ability to speak has been restricted by laws that prohibit and even criminalize a service provider like us from disclosing the exact number of national security letters ('NSLs') and Foreign Intelligence Surveillance Act ('FISA') court orders received - even if that number is zero." - Avian Network's VP of Legal Ben Lee has blogged.

On 7 October 2014, Twitter announce that there will be a lawsuit against the United States government for violating its First Amendment right to freedom of speech. The Transparency Report which would reveal how many national security letters (NSLs) and Foreign Intelligence Surveillance Act (FISA) orders Twitter receives. They provided a draft of the transparency report to the Department of Justice and discussed it for months. Twitter was still unable to get the permission for allowing them to publish even a redacted version of the report from the government. The response form FBI for its stance is that the information Twitter wants to publish "is classified and cannot be publicly released", they also said according to the framework provided on 27 January 2014, Twitter is only permitted to qualify its description of the total number of accounts affected by all national security legal process it has received but it cannot quantify that description with specific detail that goes well beyond what is allowed under the 27th Jan 2014 framework and that discloses properly classified information.

=== About the government ===
The United States government announced on 30 August 2013 that a transparency report which is in its own form will be released. Director of National Intelligence James Clapper announced the change on his office's Tumblr blog. He said that the decision will come naturally after President Barack Obama ordered the declassification of as much intelligence information as possible. Total numbers for national security letters, Foreign Intelligence Surveillance Act (FISA) business records requests, FISA one register/trap and trace requests will be stated in the transparency report. Beside that, the report will also include the number of targets being investigated in each of these requests. The number will reflect the 12 months prior to the date published. The inspiration of the report comes from the recent surveillance program leaks from former NSA-contractor Edward Snowden, according to an anonymous source speaking with the Washington Post. Google, Twitter, and Facebook all release their own forms of transparency report, however they are not allowed to release this sort of information in their report.

== See also ==
- Censorship
- Internet censorship
- Global Network Initiative
- Foreign Intelligence Surveillance Act (FISA)
- Electronic Communications Privacy Act
- National security letter (NSL)
- Surveillance
