= Stephanie Sanzo =

Australian social media influencer (born 1987)

Stephanie Sanzo (born 2 April 1987), also known as Steph Fit Mum online, is an Australian weightlifter, fitness trainer, social media figure, influencer, model, and entrepreneur, known for her viral training videos online.

== Early life ==
Sanzo was born in the regional border town of Albury–Wodonga, Australia. She is a practicing Christian. After starting a role with the Australian retailer Cotton On, Sanzo moved to Geelong, Victoria. She resigned from that position after her first pregnancy.

In 2012, Sanzo began to focus on her own physical health and fitness. She says that she hated the gym, so she began running instead. After noticing some positive changes from her running regime, and recovering from a pelvic floor collapse, Sanzo began to frequent the gym, starting with light cardio before starting to lift weights.

As she built confidence, Sanzo began to share photos of her changing physique on Instagram. She also participated in her first bikini model competition. In a 2017 interview, she reflected:

“I started noticing people were liking the fitness-themed posts and my followers started growing, I even Googled how to make my followers grow and that’s when I stopped sharing personal things on my Instagram and started focusing on just fitness inspired posts.”

As her reach grew, Sanzo recruited a personal trainer, Ingrid Barclay, to assist with her gym regime and health program.

== Career ==
By 2017, Sanzo was generating an income from her social media presence, including via Instagram, Facebook, Kik, and Snapchat, with over 600,000 followers on Instagram alone. She also became a qualified personal trainer, studying her Certificate III and IV at VFA Training, Geelong.

From 2018, she worked alongside the Australian fitness trainer Kayla Itsines on the personal training app, SWEAT. Currently, she runs her own training program, LIFTit with Stephanie Sanzo, and is developing a meal planning app, Meal Engine.

In 2019, Sanzo was featured on the cover of the inaugural STRONG Fitness Magazine Australia.

Sanzo is known for specialising in heavy weight training, especially through her program BUILD, as well as power-lifting.

As of 2026, her digital presence is focused on the video-sharing platforms YouTube and TikTok, and social media platforms Facebook and Instagram. She has 1 million subscribers on YouTube, more than 2 million followers on TikTok, 2 million on Facebook, and 3.5 million on Instagram. A number of Sanzo's training clips have gone viral on YouTube, including footage of a 330lb Sumo deadlift in early 2023, which received 47 million YouTube views.

== Personal life ==
Sanzo has two children and has spoken about the challenges of her first birth, which left her with an extra twenty-five kilograms of body weight. She reflected on how training and healthy eating enabled her to "get back to her pre-baby self".

In 2017, she was in a relationship with Jamie Bisset, the co-owner of the gym she trains at. In 2024, she recalled how she met Bisset:

"I remember like one night putting the kids to bed, and I was so defeated and lonely, and I just started crying on my bathroom floor. And I just remember praying and being like, 'God, you know, I'm just gonna live for you and be the best mom that I can be.' And I'm just like, 'Just heal my heart and just trust that you will bring someone along for me'. And I think, in that moment, I really let go of my fear of being alone. [...] When I literally let go, I reckon with a week Jamie [Bisset] came into my aura."

After she began to gain popularity online, Sanzo has spoken about the online abuse she received, often targeted at her family, which prompted her to remove all personal content from her Instagram account:

"There are people out there with weird thoughts, creepy people, so I chose to promote my fitness. My kids don’t need to be on there anyway. People always comment on the photos asking me to put my kids up. It’s just unnecessary."

Sanzo is a devout Christian and points to her religious faith as the most important part of her life, saying "my faith means a lot to me". She has noted coming from "a very Christian, a very faith-filled background".

In a 2013 interview with Geelong-based personal training outfit Body Conquest, she noted that she loves training to Christian worship music, which helps her to feel "positive and uplifted" at the gym. When asked what had most helped her on her fitness modelling, she said "foremost my [Christian] Faith because without God in my life... The sun wouldn't shine as bright."

Asked in 2024 whether she was still a Christian, Sanzo responded:

"Yeah. [...] when I was a kid, I used to go to church like four days a week. Like, it would be like band practice on Tuesday, Wednesday night discipleship, youth group on Friday night and then church on Sunday. It was like nonstop. [...] So I have a very strong Christian background, and I think that's really where all my values stem from as well. I've never been like a partygoer, I never like used to swear... I've still never been drunk..."
