= Technology Coalition =

Nonprofit industry alliance combating online child sexual exploitation

- Formation: 2006
- Type: 501(c)(6) nonprofit
- Headquarters: Washington, D.C., United States
- Members: 60 technology companies (2026)
- President and CEO: Sean Litton (departing 2026)
- Website: Official website

The Technology Coalition (also known as the Tech Coalition) is an American nonprofit industry alliance of technology companies dedicated to combating online child sexual exploitation and abuse (OCSEA). Founded in 2006 and headquartered in Washington, D.C., the organization was substantially reconstituted in 2020 under a strategic plan called Project Protect, which transformed it from a small peer network into a more active body with dedicated professional staff, a multi-million-dollar research fund, and formal partnerships with international child protection organizations. As of 2026, it has 60 member companies, including major technology firms such as Google, Meta, Microsoft, Apple, Amazon, and Snap.

== Background ==
The Technology Coalition was established in 2006 as a 501(c)(6) nonprofit, a business league classification under U.S. tax law, incorporated in Virginia, by a group of technology companies seeking a shared forum for collaboration on child safety. INHOPE, the global network of internet hotlines combating online child sexual abuse material (CSAM), has described its formation as driven by a collective desire among companies to share expertise and address challenges that many of them faced in common. In its first decade, the organization operated as a low-activity peer network with minimal staff, financed through member service fees.

In June 2020, the coalition went through a significant restructuring under a plan called "Project Protect". Project Protect organized the coalition's initial strategic pivot around five pillars: technology innovation, collective action, independent research, information and knowledge sharing, and transparency and accountability. The coalition established formal partnerships with the Global Partnership to End Violence Against Children (End Violence) and the WeProtect Global Alliance as lead partners for research and collective action respectively. Member contributions rose from approximately $257,000 in 2019 to $4.76 million in 2020, reflecting the capital commitments made to fund the new agenda.

=== Funding ===
The Technology Coalition is funded entirely by member companies and does not accept government funding. Annual revenue from member contributions, as reported in IRS Form 990 filings, grew from approximately $257,000 in 2019 to $6.2 million in 2021 following the launch of Project Protect, before declining to $3.8 million in 2022, $2.3 million in 2023, and recovering to $4.2 million in 2024.

== Programs ==
=== Lantern ===
In November 2023, the coalition launched Lantern, a cross-platform signal-sharing program that allows participating technology companies to share information and threat indicators about accounts and content that violate their child safety policies with one another. This program operates using the open source ThreatExchange platform supported by Meta. Participating companies may use shared information to investigate activity on their own platforms before taking enforcement action. Initial participants included Discord, Google, Mega, Meta, Quora, Roblox, Snap, and Twitch.

At launch, Business for Social Responsibility (BSR) published a human rights impact assessment of the program, making 19 recommendations to mitigate risks to privacy, freedom of expression, and non-discrimination arising from cross-platform data sharing. The coalition published a public response to those recommendations.

During a January 2024 Senate Judiciary Committee hearing on online child sexual exploitation, CEOs of Discord and X both referenced the Technology Coalition in their testimony, with Discord's CEO noting the company was sharing detection technology through the coalition and X's CEO stating the platform was applying to join Lantern.

In August 2024, the coalition launched a financial sector pilot with Block, Inc. and Western Union as the first participants to determine whether sharing signals with payment platforms could help disrupt the financial flows associated with OCSEA. By April 2026, the coalition reported that Lantern had surpassed two million cumulative signals since its launch, with approximately one million shared in 2025 alone, and that participating companies had taken over 350,000 enforcement actions against accounts, URLs, and content identified through the program.

=== Pathways ===
Launched in 2024, Pathways provides smaller technology companies with access to expert guidance, resources, and peer engagement to help them establish foundational child safety capabilities, targeting companies that may lack the internal capacity of larger platforms.

=== Safe Online Research Fund ===
The Tech Coalition Safe Online Research Fund is administered jointly with the Safe Online grantmaking initiative of the Global Partnership to End Violence Against Children, one of the largest non-governmental funds dedicated to ending online child sexual exploitation and abuse. The fund supports independent academic and nonprofit research on OCSEA, with priority given to research generating actionable insights for the technology industry.

== See also ==
- Trust and safety
- Global Internet Forum to Counter Terrorism
- Internet Watch Foundation
- National Center for Missing and Exploited Children
- Thorn
