= Joanna Geary =

English journalist

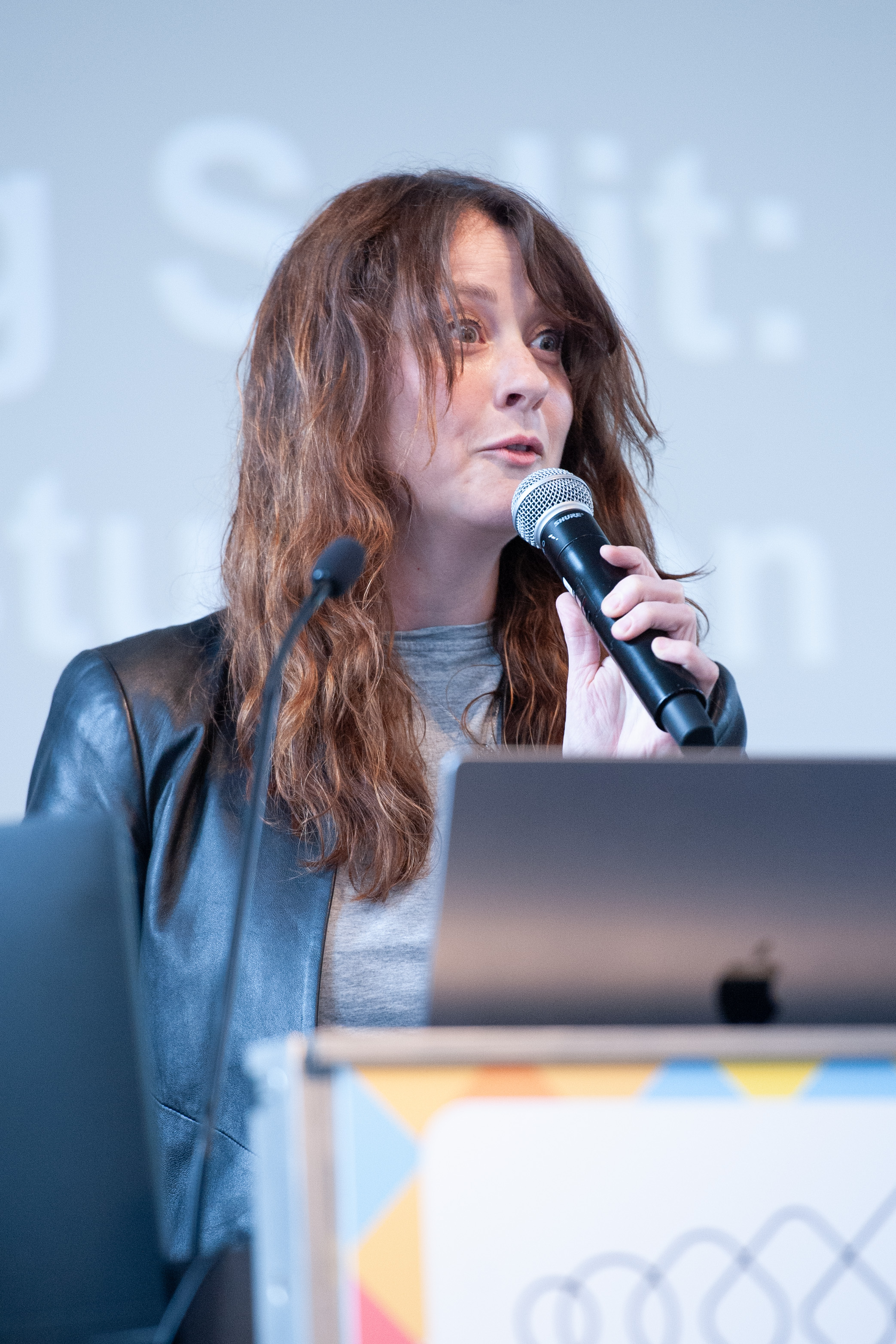
Geary in 2026

Joanna Geary is an English journalist. She is head of content and audience at Bloomberg since 2022.

Geary started as a business journalist at the Birmingham Post, after working in admin for a post-production house and volunteering as a journalist. At the Post she also worked as a creative industries correspondent and handled the online community. One community member was particularly critical and offensive, and she invited him to their offices, where he was polite in person. She left in 2009, then worked at The Times as communities editor and web development editor, including working on its move to digital subscriptions. She left in October 2011 and joined The Guardian the following month, working on digital skills in editorial first as digital development editor, and then as social and community editor.

She joined Twitter in London in September 2013 as news partnerships manager. Her Twitter handles have been @bhamjoanna, @timesjoanna, @guardianjoanna, and @joannauk. At Twitter, Geary was head of Twitter Moments in Europe at its launch in 2015. She worked on content curation and worked with the trust and safety team to reduce misinformation. In 2016, her former employer, the Birmingham Post, named her as one of the ten most influential people from the West Midlands in social media. By 2019, she moved to New York as director of curation, managing a global team. She was interviewed by Tara Lockhart for the chapter "Misinformation, Disinformation, and the Twitter-Sphere" in the 2021 book Literacy and Pedagogy in an Age of Misinformation And Disinformation. Her team was made redundant from Twitter when Elon Musk bought the company in 2022.

In May 2026 she gave a keynote at Media Party New York on the tension between providing content through agentic AI and for human communities.

Geary went to university in Birmingham. She founded Hacks/Hackers London. She is married.
