= Kik (app) =

Freeware instant messaging mobile app

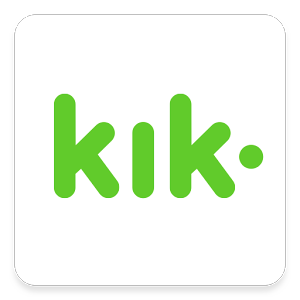
- Original author: Kik Interactive Inc.
- Developer: MediaLab AI, Inc.
- Release: October 19, 2010; 16 years ago
Stable release
- Android: 17.3.1.31975 / 20 January 2025; 22 months ago
- iOS, iPadOS, visionOS: 17.4.0 / 13 January 2025; 22 months ago
- Operating system: iOS 15, iPadOS 15, & visionOS 1 or later; Android 5.0 or later
- Available in: English
- Type: Instant messaging client
- License: Freeware
- Website: www.kik.com

Kik is a freeware instant messaging mobile app from the American company MediaLab AI, Inc., available on iOS, iPadOS, visionOS, and Android operating systems.

The application uses a smartphone's internet connection to transmit and receive messages, photos, videos, sketches, mobile web pages, and other content after users register a username.

Kik is known for its features preserving users' anonymity, such as allowing users to register without the need to provide a telephone number or valid email address. However, the application does not employ end-to-end encryption, and the company also logs user IP addresses, which could be used to determine the user's ISP and approximate location. This information, as well as "reported" conversations, are regularly surrendered upon request by law enforcement organizations, sometimes without the need for a court order.

Kik was originally intended to be a music-sharing app before transitioning to messaging, briefly offering users the ability to send a limited number of SMS text messages directly from the application.

During the first 15 days after Kik's re-release as a messaging app, over one million accounts were created. In May 2016, Kik Messenger announced that they had approximately 300 million registered users, and was used by approximately 40% of the teenagers in the United States.

Kik Messenger was acquired by Medialab Technology in October 2019.

== History ==
Kik Interactive was founded in 2009 by a group of students from the University of Waterloo in Canada who wished to create new technologies for use on mobile smartphones. Kik Messenger is the first app developed by Kik Interactive, and was released on October 19, 2010. Within 15 days of its release, Kik Messenger reached one million user registrations, with Twitter being credited as a catalyst for the new application's popularity.

On November 24, 2010, Research In Motion (RIM) removed Kik Messenger from BlackBerry App World and limited the functionality of the software for its users. RIM also sued Kik Interactive for patent infringement and misuse of trademarks. In October 2013, the companies settled the lawsuit, with the terms undisclosed.

In November 2014, Kik announced a $38.3 million Series C funding round and its first acquisition, buying GIF Messenger "Relay". The funding was from Valiant Capital Partners, Millennium Technology Value Partners, and SV Angel. By this time, Kik had raised a total of $70.5 million.

On August 16, 2015, Kik received a $50 million investment from Chinese Internet giant Tencent, the parent company of the popular Chinese messaging service WeChat. The investment earned the company a billion dollar valuation. Company CEO Ted Livingston stated Kik's aspirations to become "the WeChat of the West" and said that attracting younger users was an important part of the company's strategy.

In March 2016, the arrest of registered sex offender Thomas Paul Keeler II uncovered more than 200 Kik groups dedicated to the distribution and sale of child pornography on the site. In September 2016, CBS News published a story on the murder of 13-year-old Nicole Lovell, highlighting how easy it was to track and abuse children on Kik and calling it a "predator's paradise". Kik released a public statement through CBS on June 3, 2017 stating, "We take online safety very seriously, and we're constantly assessing and improving our trust and safety measures. Nicole Lovell suffered a terrible tragedy and our sincere condolences continue to go out to her family. Since the time of the incident, Kik has taken a variety of proactive measures to help increase safety on our platform." In an online investigation in August 2017, Forbes staffers signed up for the service posing as 14-year-old girls and encountered 20 profiles of people charged or sentenced for sexual crimes. In November 2017, Kik Messenger was removed from the Windows Store. As of 23 January 2018, neither the developers nor Microsoft have provided a statement or an explanation on the removal of the app.

Also in 2017, Kik decided against more VC funding, instead raising nearly $100 million in a high-profile initial coin offering (ICO) on the Ethereum blockchain. In this crowd sale, they sold "Kin" digital tokens to the contributors.

In July 2018, the Kin Foundation released the Kinit beta app on the Google Play store, restricted to US residents only. It offers different ways of earning and spending the Kin coin natively; for example, a user can do simple surveys to earn Kin and spend it on digital goods like gift cards.

In September 2019, Kik's CEO and founder Ted Livingston, announced in a blog post that Kik Messenger would be shut down on 19 October 2019, with over 100 employees laid off. However this decision was later reversed and in October 2019, Medialab acquired Kik Messenger.

== Features ==
A main attraction of Kik that differentiates it from other messaging apps is its anonymity. To register for the Kik service, a user must enter a first and last name, e-mail address, and birth date (which must show that the user is at least 13 years old), and select a username. The Kik registration process does not request or require the entry of a phone number (although the user has the option to enter one), unlike some other messaging services that require a user to provide a functioning mobile phone number.

The New York Times has reported that, according to law enforcement, Kik's anonymity features go beyond those of most widely used apps. As of February 2016, Kik's guide for law enforcement said that the company cannot locate user accounts based on first and last name, e-mail address and/or birth date; the exact username is required to locate a particular account. The guide further said that the company does not have access to content or "historical user data" such as photographs, videos, and the text of conversations, and that photographs and videos are automatically deleted shortly after they are sent. A limited amount of data from a particular account (identified by exact username), including first and last name, birthdate, e-mail address, link to a current profile picture, device-related information, and user location information such as the most recently used IP address, can be preserved for a period of 90 days pending receipt of a valid order from law enforcement. Kik's anonymity has also been cited as a protective safety measure for good faith users, in that "users have screennames; the app doesn't share phone numbers or email addresses."

Kik introduced several new user features in 2015, including a full-screen in-chat browser that allows users to find and share content from the web; a feature allowing users to send previously recorded videos in Kik Messenger; and "Kik Codes", which assigns each user a unique code similar to a QR code, making it easier to connect and chat with other users. Kik joined the Virtual Global Taskforce, a global anti-child-abuse organization, in March 2015. Kik began using Microsoft's PhotoDNA in March 2015 to premoderate images added by users. That same month, Kik released native video capture allowing users to record up to 15 seconds in the chat window. In October 2015, Kik partnered with the Ad Council as part of an anti-bullying campaign. The campaign was featured on the app and Kik released stickers in collaboration with the campaign. Kik released a feature to send GIFs as emojis in November 2015. Kik added SafePhoto to its safety features in October 2016 which "detects, reports, and deletes known child exploitation images" sent through the platform. Kik partnered with ConnectSafely in 2016 to produce a "parents handbook" and joined The Technology Coalition, an anti-sexual exploitation group including Facebook, Google, Twitter and LinkedIn.

=== Bots ===
Kik added promoted chats in 2014, which used bots to converse with users about promoted brands through keywords activating responses. The feature allows companies to communicate with more potential clients than would be possible manually. Promoted messages reach target audiences by gender, country and device. In April 2016, Kik added a bot store to its app, which allows users to order food or products through an automated chat. Third-party companies release bots which will access the company's offerings. The bot shop added a web bubble (also known as "wubbles") feature to allow rich media content to be shared in conversation threads, as well as suggested responses and a feature allowing bots to be active in group threads. An update, released in September 2016, added concierge bots which can give users tips, tutorials, or recommendations within a specific brand.

== Security ==
On November 4, 2014, Kik scored 1 out of 7 points on the Electronic Frontier Foundation's secure messaging scorecard. Kik received a point for encryption during transit but lost points because communications are not encrypted with a key to which the provider does not have access, users cannot verify contacts' identities, past messages are not secure if the encryption keys are stolen, the code is not open to independent review, the security design is not properly documented, and there had not been a recent independent security audit.

== Awards and recognition ==
On October 1, 2014, Sony Music and Kik Interactive were given a Smarties award by the Mobile Marketing Association (MMA) for their global music marketing campaign with One Direction. In October 2016, company CEO Ted Livingston was recognized as Toronto's most brilliant tech innovator by Toronto Life for his work with Kik. Livingston was also recognized for being one of the "Most Creative People in Business" on Fast Company's 2017 list.

== Controversies ==
=== Use by minors with explicit content ===
Like many other social media services, Kik has garnered negative attention due to instances of minors exchanging explicit messages and photos with adults, causing law enforcement and the media to frequently express concerns about the app. Automated spam bots have also been used to distribute explicit images and text over Kik Messenger. A state law enforcement official interviewed by The New York Times in February 2016 identified Kik as "the problem app of the moment". Police said they found Kik's response frustrating and one detective said obtaining information from Kik was a "bureaucratic nightmare". Constable Jason Cullum of the Northamptonshire Police paedophile online investigation team stated delays in obtaining information from the company increased the risk to children. Cullum stated, "It's incredibly frustrating. We're banging our heads against a brick wall. There's a child that's going to be abused for probably another 12 months before we know who that is." Since its acquisition by Medialab, Kik has revamped its policies and launched a variety of tools and resources including a guide for law enforcement and parents.

Prior to 2015, Kik Interactive addressed this issue by informing parents and police about their options to combat child exploitation. In March 2015, the company adopted a more aggressive strategy by utilizing Microsoft's PhotoDNA cloud service to automatically detect, delete, and report the distribution of child exploitation images on its app. Some experts have noted that because PhotoDNA operates by comparing images against an existing database of exploitative images, it does not effectively prevent "realtime" online child abuse and may not detect material not yet added to its comparison database. Kik Interactive also began collaborating internationally with law enforcement by joining the Virtual Global Taskforce, a partnership between businesses, child protection agencies, and international police services that combats online child exploitation and abuse. The company also sponsors an annual conference on crimes against children.

Kik has been criticized for providing inadequate parental control over minors' use of the app. The ability to share messages without alerting parents has been noted as "one of the reasons why teens like Kik". Parents cannot automatically view their child's Kik communications remotely from another device, but instead must have the password to their child's user account and view the communications on the same device used by their child. As of February 2016, Kik's parents' guide stresses that teens between 13 and 18 should have a parent's permission to use Kik, but there is no technical way to enforce the requirement or to guarantee that a minor will not enter a false birthdate. Kik Interactive has said that it uses "typical" industry standards for age verification, that "perfect age verification" is "not plausible", and that the company deletes accounts of users under 13 when it finds them, or when a parent requests the deletion.

=== npm left-pad incident ===
In March 2016, Kik Interactive was involved in a high-profile dispute over use of the name kik with independent code developer Azer Koçulu, the author of numerous open-source software modules published on npm, a package manager widely used by JavaScript projects to install dependencies. Koçulu had published an extension to Node.js on npm under the name kik. Kik Interactive contacted him objecting to his use of the name, for which the company claimed intellectual property rights, and asked him to change the name. When Koçulu refused, Kik Interactive contacted npm management, who agreed to transfer ownership of the module to Kik without Koçulu's consent. Koçulu then unpublished all of his modules from npm, including a popular eleven-line code module called left-pad upon which many JavaScript projects depended. Although Koçulu subsequently published left-pad on GitHub, its sudden removal from npm caused many projects (including Kik itself) to stop working, due to their dependency on the Node and Babel packages. In view of widespread software disruption, npm restored Koçulu's left-pad and made Cameron Westland of Autodesk its maintainer. The incident sparked controversies over the assertion of intellectual property rights and the use of dependencies in software development.

== Cryptocurrency ==
Kin is an ERC-20 cryptocurrency token issued on the public Ethereum blockchain. Kin was first announced in early 2017 which marked a pivot in Kik's strategy, a response to difficulties faced from competing with larger social networks such as Facebook. Kin was launched in September 2017 with an initial coin offering (ICO) raising $98 million from 10,000 participants. The purpose of the token is to facilitate value transfers in digital services such as gaming applications and social media, and was initially launched on Kik Messenger to leverage the application's 15 million monthly active users.

As of 2019, the enforcement division of the U.S. Securities and Exchange Commission considers the cryptocurrency offering to have been an unregulated security issue and is expected to begin legal action against the company. Kik has challenged the SEC's ability to regulate cryptocurrencies.

On September 7, 2017, only days before the Kin ICO, Kik announced that Canadian citizens would be barred from participating, citing weak guidance from the Ontario Securities Commission for the decision.

By 2019 the value of Kin had fallen by 99%.

== See also ==
- Comparison of cross-platform instant messaging clients
