= Tech Against Terrorism =

International counter-terrorism collaboration

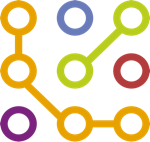
Logo of Tech Against Terrorism

Tech Against Terrorism is a United Nations-backed international initiative founded in April 2017 to combat terrorist activity within the online technology sphere. It builds tools to help other companies combat online terrorist activities.

Founding members include the United Nations Counter-Terrorism Committee Executive Directorate and ICT4peace.

== See also ==
- Global Internet Forum to Counter Terrorism
