= Global Alliance for Information and Communication Technologies and Development =

The Global Alliance for Information and Communication Technologies and Development (also known as Global Alliance for ICT and Development or GAID) is a subgroup or continuation of the United Nations Information and Communication Technologies Task Force. GAID was launched by the United Nations Secretary General Kofi Annan in 2006, at the end of his tenure.

== Mission ==
According to the United Nations press release, the organization's mission is to facilitate and promote integration by providing a platform for an open, inclusive, multi-stakeholder cross-sectoral policy dialogue on the role of information and communication technology in development. The Alliance organizes events which address core issues related to the role of information and communication technology in economic development, especially of impoverished or disadvantaged segments of society.

== Structure ==
The Alliance makes extensive use of web-based collaborative technologies, thus minimizing the need for physical meetings. Members include both governments and members of the private and commercial sectors. Its inaugural meeting was held on June 19, 2006 in Kuala Lumpur, Malaysia.

It is led by an 11-person steering committee, with Intel Corporation's Craig Barrett as its initial chairperson, followed by Talal Abu-Ghazaleh, a prominent businessman in the Arab world. A 60-person Strategy Council is composed of 30 governments, plus 30 representatives from the private sector, civil society and international organizations.

== Communities of Expertise ==
Communities of Expertise (CoEs) are networks convened by GAID to bring together motivated and capable actors to address specific, well-defined ICTD problems in a results-oriented manner and to identify and disseminate good practices. CoEs include education, entrepreneurship, governance, and health, and cross cutting themes include gender, rural development and connectivity.

In October 2006, under the CoE of Governance, the ICT4Peace Foundation was invited to a partnership with the UN Department of Economic and Social Affairs (DESA) and GAID as the focal point for overseeing and promoting the spirit of Paragraph 36 of the WSIS Tunis Declaration. Paragraph 36 flags the potential for the use of ICTs to promote peace and to prevent conflict which, inter alia, negatively affects achieving development goals. On 13 January 2010 the ICT4Peace Foundation created the ICT4Peace Foundation wiki on Haiti Earthquake.
