= Ted Livingston (Kik) =

Canadian tech executive

- Born: 1987 (age 38–39); Toronto, Ontario, Canada
- Education: University of Waterloo
- Occupations: Founder and CEO of Kik Messenger
- Spouse: Christine Thayer

Ted Livingston (born 1987) is founder of Kik Messenger that provides mobile messaging service.

== Early life ==
Livingston was born in Toronto. As a child, Livingston had a passion for building Lego structures and automated machines in his basement. He continues following this interest on the school robotics team.

From 1997 to 2005, Livingston attended the Crescent School, in Toronto.

== 2005–Present: UWaterloo and Kik ==
Livingston took a mechatronics bachelor's degree at the University of Waterloo from 2005 to 2009 in order to "pursue his dream of building robots." He participated in the Waterloo co-op program there, with placements at Honda and the City of Toronto government. Livingston eventually landed a co-op position as a system engineering project coordinator at Research in Motion.

In December 2007, eight months into his co-op, Livingston was promoted by Research in Motion to "Technical Product Management Coordinator". In 2008, he turned down a full-time job to return to school at the advice of his manager.

Back at Waterloo, Livingston decided to take part in the Velocity program, a startup-focused community where he founded Kik Messenger instead of completing his degree.

Kik now competes with Facebook and WeChat. At its peak in 2015 it boasted over 275 million registered users, and it was used by approximately 40 percent of American teens. In 2015 Chinese Internet giant Tencent invested $50 million into Kik.

In 2014, Forbes placed him on their "Top 30 under 30" in their technology list.

In November 2015, Torontolife ranked Livingston at #20 on their "Toronto's 50 Most Influential,".
