= Missing Children's Assistance Reauthorization Act of 2013 =

Missing Children’s Assistance Reauthorization Act of 2013
- Long title: To amend the Missing Children’s Assistance Act, and for other purposes.
- Announced in: the 113th United States Congress
- Sponsored by: Rep. Brett Guthrie (R, KY-2)
- Number of co-sponsors: 2

Codification
- Acts affected: Missing Children’s Assistance Act, Family Educational Rights and Privacy Act of 1974
- U.S.C. sections affected: 42 U.S.C. § 5771, 42 U.S.C. § 5773, 20 U.S.C. § 1232g, 42 U.S.C. § 5775(a), 42 U.S.C. § 5777(a),
- Agencies affected: United States Interagency Council on Homelessness
- Authorizations of appropriations: $35,800,000.00 for each of fiscal years 2014, 2015, 2016, 2017 and 2018

Legislative history
- Introduced in the House as H.R. 3092 by Rep. Brett Guthrie (R, KY-2) on September 12, 2013; Committee consideration by United States House Committee on Education and the Workforce; Passed the House on September 17, 2013 (Roll Call Vote 460: 407-2)

The Missing Children's Assistance Reauthorization Act of 2013 (H.R. 3092) is a bill that was introduced into the United States House of Representatives during the 113th United States Congress. The Missing Children's Assistance Reauthorization Act of 2013 reauthorizes the Missing Children's Assistance Act and authorizes $40 million a year to fund the National Center for Missing and Exploited Children.

== Provisions of the bill ==
This summary is based largely on the summary provided by the United States House Committee on Education and the Workforce, a public domain source.

As passed by the House, the E. Clay Shaw Jr. Missing Children's Assistance Reauthorization Act would:

- Support the National Center for Missing and Exploited Children’s current activities around providing technical assistance to law enforcement in coordinating with states and school districts to find and recover missing children; coordinate with state welfare agencies to find children missing from foster care; and identify and recover victims of (or those at risk for) child sex trafficking.
- Include educational stakeholders and homeless service providers in the list of recipients of the Department of Justice’s Office of Juvenile Justice and Delinquency Prevention (OJJDP) education and prevention activities.
- Require the national incidence studies on missing and exploited children be provided every three years (rather than periodically, as is currently written).
- Strengthen OJJDP's oversight and accountability and codify current practice by limiting the use of federal funds for employee compensation.
- Authorize funding for the Act at $40 million for each of the five fiscal years (FY 2014-FY2018), with up to $32 million of funds being used to carry out the National Center for Missing and Exploited Children’s responsibilities.

== Procedural history ==
=== House ===
The Missing Children's Assistance Reauthorization Act of 2013 was introduced into the House on September 12, 2013, by Rep. Brett Guthrie (R, KY-2). It was referred to the United States House Committee on Education and the Workforce. The House Majority Leader Eric Cantor placed the bill on the House Schedule on September 13, 2013, for consideration under a suspension of the rules on September 17. On September 17, 2013, the House voted in Roll Call Vote 460 to pass the bill 407–2.

=== Senate ===
Passed by the Senate September 25, 2013.

=== President ===
Passed by the President September 30, 2013.

== Debate and discussion ==
When the bill was up for debate in the House, no one spoke against it.

== See also ==
- List of bills in the 113th United States Congress
- National Center for Missing and Exploited Children
