= Hany Farid =

American university professor

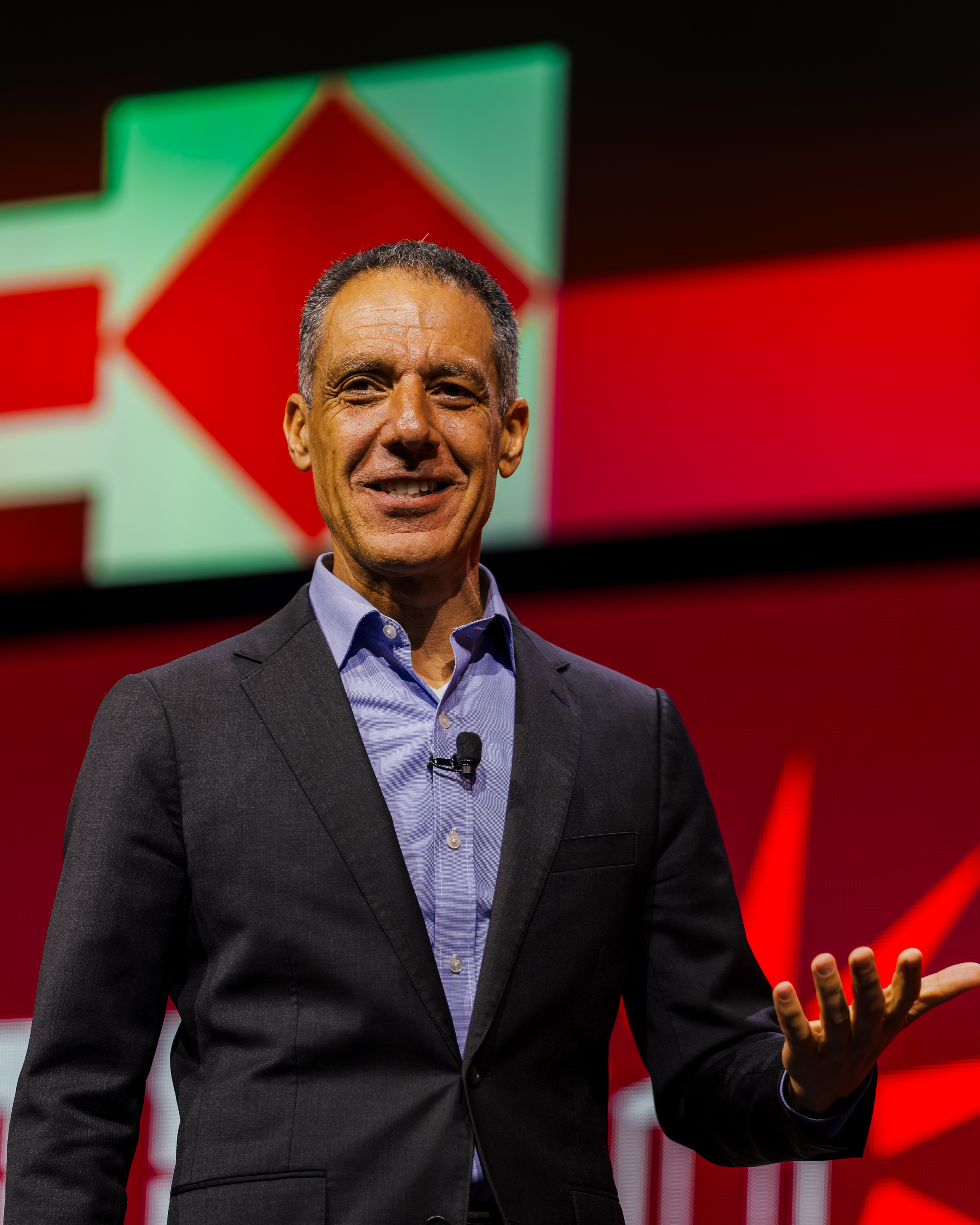
- Farid in 2026
- Born: February 10, 1966 (age 60); Mülheim, Germany
- Education: University of Rochester; SUNY Albany; University of Pennsylvania; MIT
- Awards: Alfred P. Sloan Fellowship; Guggenheim Fellowship
- Scientific career
- Fields: Computer vision Digital forensics
- Workplaces: Dartmouth College; UC Berkeley
- Thesis: Range Estimation by Optical Differentiation (1997)
- Doctoral advisor: Eero Simoncelli
- Website: farid.berkeley.edu

Hany Farid (born February 10, 1966) is an Egyptian-American university professor, also known as the "father of digital forensics", who specializes in the analysis of digital images and the detection of digitally manipulated media such as deepfakes. Farid served as Dean and Head of School for the UC Berkeley School of Information. In addition to teaching, writing, and conducting research, Farid acts as a consultant for non-profits, government agencies, and news organizations. He is the author of the book Photo Forensics (2016). He is one of the designers of the PhotoDNA algorithm.

== Education ==
Farid received his undergraduate degree in computer science and applied mathematics from the University of Rochester in 1989. He earned a M.S. in computer science from SUNY/Albany in 1992. His Ph.D. in computer science from the University of Pennsylvania was awarded in 1997. In 1999, Farid completed a two-year post-doctoral program in Brain and Cognitive Sciences at the Massachusetts Institute of Technology.

== Career ==
Farid specializes in image analysis and human perception. He has been called the "father" of digital image forensics by NOVA scienceNOW. He is the recipient of a 2006 Guggenheim Fellowship and a 2002 Sloan Fellowship for his work in the field. Farid was named a lifetime fellow of the National Academy of Inventors in 2016.

=== University positions ===
In January 2021, Hany Farid was appointed Associate Dean and Head of School for the School of Information. He remains professor at the University of California, Berkeley with a joint appointment in the Department of Electrical Engineering & Computer Science and the School of Information. He is also a member of the Berkeley Artificial Intelligence Lab, the Center for Innovation in Vision and Optics, and the Vision Science program.

Prior to joining Berkeley, Farid was the Albert Bradley 1915 Third Century Professor of Computer Science at Dartmouth College and former chair of Dartmouth's Neukom Institute for Computational Science. Farid was well known at Dartmouth for teaching the college's introductory course on programming and computer science. Joseph Helble, dean of the Thayer School of Engineering at Dartmouth, described Farid as a pioneer in the field of digital forensics. Farid joined Dartmouth's faculty in 1999. He remained at Dartmouth until 2019.

=== Consulting and media appearances ===
Farid has consulted for intelligence agencies, news organizations, courts, and scientific journals seeking to authenticate the validity of images. Research shows that humans aren't very good at discriminating between fakes and real photographs. Faked images may be produced for a variety of purposes: deepfakes are often used to fake the identify of a person in pornographic materials. Politically motivated faked images may be used to present disinformation and hate speech, and to undermine the credibility of media, government and elections. Authenticating figures in scientific publications is critically important because graphics programs, such as Photoshop, are frequently used to crop and to label figures. Such manipulations can be used to alter, disguise, and falsify the data.

In a series of papers in 2009, 2010 and 2015, after digitally analyzing a photograph of Lee Harvey Oswald holding a rifle and newspaper, Farid concluded that "the photo almost certainly was not altered". When the 2013 World Press Photo of the Year was alleged as being a "fake" composite work, Farid spoke out against the allegation and criticized the underlying method of error level analysis. In 2020, Farid and Matyáš Boháček trained a computer model to detect fake videos of Ukraine's president Volodymyr Zelenskyy.

As of 2018, Farid was a consultant for the Associated Press, Reuters, The New York Times, and the Defense Advanced Research Project Agency.

=== PhotoDNA ===
PhotoDNA is a system that uses robust hashing technology Farid worked on with Microsoft, which is "now widely used by Internet companies to stop the spread of content showing sexual exploitation or pornography involving children." In late 2015, Farid completed improvements to PhotoDNA that made it capable of analyzing video and audio files besides still images. In 2016, Farid proposed that the technology could be used to stem the spread of terror-related imagery, but there was little interest shown initially by social media companies. In December 2016, Facebook, Twitter, Google and Microsoft announced plans to use PhotoDNA to tackle extremist content such as terrorist recruitment videos or violent terrorist imagery.

=== Counter Extremism Project ===
In June 2016, Farid, as a senior advisor to the Counter Extremism Project (CEP), unveiled a software tool for use by Internet and social media companies to "quickly find and eliminate extremist content used to spread and incite violence and attacks." It functions similarly to PhotoDNA.

To operationalize this new technology to combat extremism, Farid and CEP proposed the creation of a National Office for Reporting Extremism (NORex), which would house a comprehensive database of extremist content and function similar to the National Center for Missing & Exploited Children.

=== Truepic ===
In the fall of 2018, Truepic acquired Farid's start-up, Fourandsix Technologies. Farid started Fourandsix Technologies with Kevin Connor, a former vice president at Adobe Systems. The first product released by Fourandsix was called Fourmatch. Fourmatch was designed to detect alterations of digital images. The primary use of Fourmatch was to check the authenticity of images introduced as evidence in court.

As of February 2019, Farid was an advisor to Truepic. The underlying idea behind the Truepic approach is to automatically verify a photo when it is taken, with camera-based apps that assess the image using proprietary algorithms. Later versions of the image can be compared against the original to detect alteration. If this type of verification technology becomes an industry standard, it could help news and social media websites, insurers and others to automatically screen images they receive.

=== GetReal Security ===
In 2022, Farid partnered with Ballistic Ventures to co-found GetReal Security, a company intended to "protect organizations worldwide from the threats posed by the malicious use of manipulated content.". GetReal launched with techniques such as detecting whether shadows within an image are physically consistent to detect manipulated content. Farid described their focus as "deploying forensic techniques that afford explainable and interpretable results so that analysts can understand why we classify content as authentic or not."

=== Content Authenticity Initiative ===
In June 2023, Farid formally joined the Adobe-led Content Authenticity Initiative (CAI) as a paid advisor. Within this role, Farid serves as a primary expert reference and media commentator for public relations and journalists covering synthetic media, deepfakes, and automated verification challenges.

== Personal life ==
Farid was born to Egyptian parents in Germany. He grew up in Rochester, New York. He is married to the neuroscientist Emily Cooper. Cooper, also a professor at the University of California, Berkeley, studies human vision and virtual reality. Cooper met Farid when he spent a sabbatical from Dartmouth at Berkeley.

== Publications ==
=== Books ===
- H. Farid. Fake Photos, MIT Press, Essential Knowledge Series, 2019.
- H. Farid. Photo Forensics, MIT Press, 2016.

=== Selected technical papers ===
- Farid, H. A Survey of Image Forgery Detection, IEEE Signal Processing Magazine, 26:2 (2009) 16-25.
- Farid, H. Digital Image Forensics, Scientific American, 298:6 (2008) 66-71.
- Johnson, M K and H Farid, Exposing Digital Forgeries in Complex Lighting Environments, IEEE Transactions on Information Forensics and Security, 2:3 (2007) 450-461.
- Johnson, M K and H Farid, Exposing Digital Forgeries Through Specular Highlights on the Eye, 9th International Workshop on Information Hiding, Saint Malo, France (2007).
- Lyu, S, D Rockmore, and H Farid, A Digital Technique for Art Authentication, Proceedings of the National Academy of Sciences, 101:49 (2004) 17006-17010.

=== Selected opinion pieces ===
- Farid, Hany (December 5, 2022). "Text-to-image AI: powerful, easy-to-use technology for making art – and fakes". The Conversation.
- Deepfakes Give New Meaning to the Concept of 'fake news,' and They're Here to Stay, Fox News, 18 June 2019.
- Facebook's Plan for End-to-End Encryption Sacrifices a Lot of Security for Just a Little Bit of Privacy, Fox News, June 2016.
- Tech Companies Must Act to Stop Horrific Exploitation of their Platforms, The Hill, 17 April 2019
- Facebook, YouTube and Social Media are Failing Society: Pull their ads until they change, USA Today, 4 March 2019
- Recruiting Terrorists: We're losing the fight against online extremism – here's why, The Hill, 2 August 2018
- Verifying BigTech Promises, EUReporter, 11 May 2018
