= Vanished Children's Alliance =

Former American charitable organization

The Vanished Children's Alliance (VCA) was an American non-profit charity organization based in San Jose, California. It was established in 1980 and incorporated as a 501(c)(3) in 1981. In 1996, it was reported that VCA had helped the families of over 20,000 missing children; in 2005, VCA had helped over 32,000 cases. As of September 30, 2009, however, the organization is no longer operational; the VCA's website claimed that the organization "ha[d] been unable to recover from the recent recession".

According to the organization's website, its mission was "providing for the prevention, location, recovery and reunification of missing and abducted children." It provided assistance to families both within the United States and overseas.

Georgia Hilgeman (later Hilgeman-Hammond) of Oakland, California, founded the organization after her daughter was abducted by her former husband in 1976 and found five years later in Mexico City. In 1990, VCA received $109,000 in donations, which were spent on posters, a toll-free hotline, and the salaries of eight staff members.

It was the oldest organization devoted to missing children in the United States and was recognized by the U.S. Department of Justice and the National Center for Missing and Exploited Children.
