= Michelle DeLaune =

American nonprofit executive and criminologist

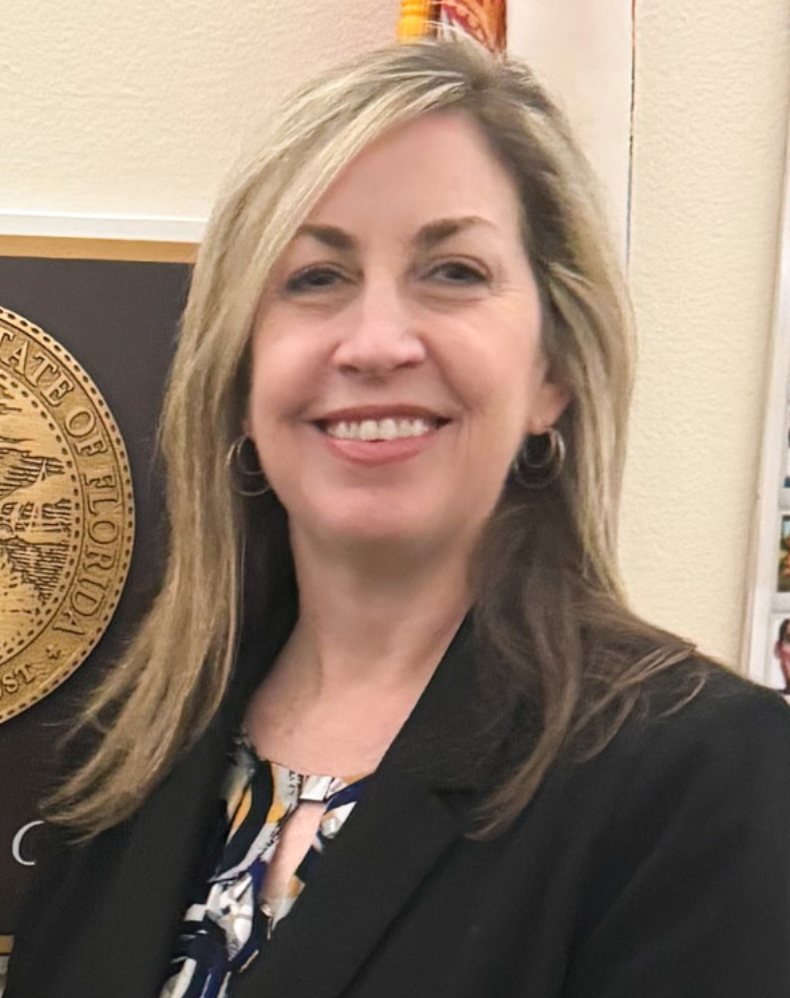
- DeLaune in 2024
- Education: George Mason University; University of Maryland, College Park
- Occupations: Nonprofit executive, criminologist
- Employer: National Center for Missing & Exploited Children

Michelle Collins DeLaune is an American nonprofit executive and criminologist serving as the president and chief executive officer of the National Center for Missing & Exploited Children (NCMEC) since 2022. She has worked at NCMEC since the early 2000s, holding roles focused on combating child exploitation and supporting missing children and their families.

== Early life education ==
DeLaune was raised in Falls Church, Virginia, and attended St. Philip Catholic Church during her childhood. She graduated from Paul VI Catholic High School in 1991, where she was a member of the school’s drill team and later taught and choreographed dance locally.

DeLaune completed a B.A. in psychology at George Mason University. She later obtained a master's degree in criminology from the University of Maryland, College Park. During her graduate studies, she interned with the Federal Bureau of Investigation’s Behavioral Science Unit in Quantico, Virginia.

== Career ==
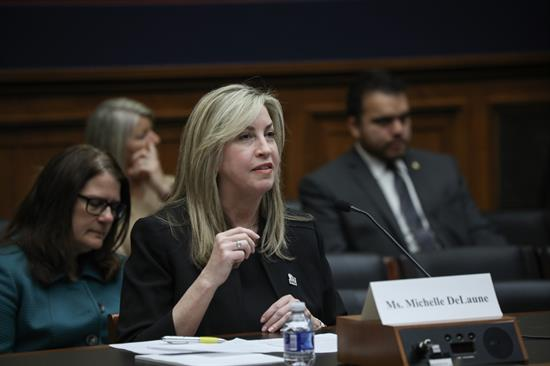
DeLaune speaking at a U.S. House Education Subcommittee on Early Childhood, Elementary, and Secondary Education hearing in 2024.

DeLaune began her career at the National Center for Missing & Exploited Children (NCMEC) shortly after completing her education, influenced by a connection made during her internship. Starting as an analyst on the CyberTipline, she worked on cases involving child sexual exploitation. Over 16 years, she held various roles, including eight years as the chief operating officer, before becoming the organization’s first female president and chief executive officer in April 2022.

Under DeLaune's leadership, NCMEC introduced initiatives to address evolving threats to children, including the Take It Down program. This initiative allows minors to submit digital fingerprints of explicit images, helping technology companies remove the content from their platforms. Throughout her tenure, DeLaune emphasized prevention education, using data from NCMEC cases to develop age-appropriate resources for families, educators, and law enforcement.

Her work has focused on combating online child exploitation, particularly crimes such as sextortion and financial blackmail involving minors. She has also testified before U.S. Congress and participated in international discussions on child dignity, including meetings with Pope Francis at Vatican City.

== Personal life ==
DeLaune resides in Alexandria, Virginia, where she is a parishioner at the Basilica of St. Mary.
