= Stanford Internet Observatory =

Misinformation researchers with Stanford University

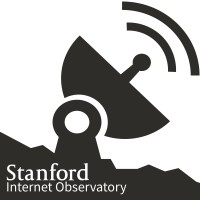
Logo

The Stanford Internet Observatory (SIO) was a multidisciplinary program for the study of abuse in information technologies, with a focus on social media, established in 2019. It is part of the Stanford Cyber Policy Center, a joint initiative of the Freeman Spogli Institute for International Studies and Stanford Law School. The program ended in 2024.

== History ==
Alex Stamos founded the Stanford Internet Observatory in 2019, after leaving Facebook the year before over frustrations that he was not allowed to publish the full account of Russia's influence operations on the platform in the 2016 US Presidential elections.

== Projects and reports ==
According to Lauren Coffey of Inside Higher Ed, by 2024 the Stanford Internet Observatory had "published 15 white paper reports, 10 journal articles and garnered more than 5,000 media mentions".

The SIO was the first to out Russian support for Trump online in 2016, raised China spying concerns around the Clubhouse app in a 2021 report, partnered with the Wall Street Journal in a 2023 report on Instagram and online child sexual abuse materials, and developed a curriculum for teaching college students how to handle trust and safety issues on social media platforms.

The Stanford Internet Observatory participated in pre-2020 election research focusing on misinformation about election processes and procedures, resulting in a 2021 report that concluded "The 2020 election demonstrated that actors—both foreign and domestic—remain committed to weaponizing viral false and misleading narratives to undermine confidence in the US electoral system and erode Americans’ faith in our democracy".

=== Election Integrity Partnership ===
SIO co-founded the Election Integrity Partnership along with the University of Washington Center for an Informed Public to identify real-time viral falsehoods about election procedures and outcomes. The partnership worked the 2020 and 2022 election cycles and has since concluded their work. The lawsuits, which were eventually dismissed, as well as rhetoric about the research and work, however, resulted in scaled back or shut down research on elections by 2024. Researchers also received threats and online harassment from disinformation about their research. As of 2024, the Center for an Informed Public continued to work on election misinformation at the University of Washington.

=== Journal of Online Trust and Safety ===
In 2021, SIO launched the Journal of Online Trust and Safety, an open access peer-reviewed journal covering research on how consumer internet services are abused to cause harm and how to prevent those harms.

== Reception ==
The Stanford Internet Observatory was praised as "the gold-standard organization for determining the veracity of political information circulating online" by Thom Hartmann of The New Republic.

In 2024, Lauren Coffey of Inside Higher Ed wrote that SIO "served as a research powerhouse with a focus on social media amid growing misinformation".

Joseph Menn of The Washington Post wrote "The Stanford Internet Observatory [...] published some of the most influential analysis of the spread of false information on social media during elections."

== Targeted legal attacks ==
Disinformation research groups, including the Stanford Internet Observatory, having reported on such topics as the 2020 stolen election claims and COVID-19 vaccine misinformation, had been under attack by GOP resources accusing them of colluding with the US Government and social media outlets of censoring conservative voices. The GOP-led House Judiciary Committee subpoenaed Stanford University for any records or emails with government officials and social media platforms. In May 2023, America First Legal sued SIO and other researchers in Louisiana, aiming to bring down the "censorship-industrial complex". A Texas lawsuit filed by anti-vaccine advocates alleged their social media posts were flagged or removed in what it called mass censorship.

These legal cases have cost Stanford millions of dollars in legal expenses and have distracted researchers from their work. A Stanford spokesperson said: "Stanford remains deeply concerned about efforts, including lawsuits and congressional investigations, that chill freedom of inquiry and undermine legitimate and much needed academic research — both at Stanford and across academia."

On June 26, 2024, in the case Murthy v. Missouri, the US Supreme Court ruled in favor of the Stanford Internet Observatory, and any other groups, communicating with the government with the aim of stemming the spread of falsehoods online. On July 1, 2026 the lawsuit by America First Legal was dismissed.

== Breakup ==
In June 2024, the Stanford Internet Observatory cut several jobs and several news outlets reported on its dismantling. Leadership including Alex Stamos, the main fundraiser, had left in November 2023 citing the toll of the political pressure while Renée DiResta's contract was not renewed in June 2024. The SIO's closure would mark a significant setback for misinformation researchers. Conservative lawmakers had also threatened to cut federal funding to any universities that study propaganda, while the Washington Post theorized the university also might not want to alienate conservative donors. The New Republic critiqued the Republican efforts as an attempt to prevent fact-checking of GOP lies.

In a statement to Platformer on June 13, Stanford denied that SIO was being dismantled:

The important work of SIO continues under new leadership... Stanford remains deeply concerned about efforts, including lawsuits and congressional investigations, that chill freedom of inquiry and undermine legitimate and much needed academic research – both at Stanford and across academia.

On June 18, the school said it was not shutting down the project but said that its founding grants were running out and they were seeking new funding.

Some SIO work has more concrete plans to continue under new leadership at Stanford, including work on child safety, The Journal of Online Trust and Safety and the Trust and Safety Research Conference will continue.

On June 25, 2024, Renée DiResta penned an op-ed in the New York Times warning about the vulnerabilities in the upcoming US elections without the Election Integrity Partnership and other research by SIO focused on election misinformation and with greatly reduced trust and safety teams at many social media companies.

== See also ==
- Citizen Lab
- Electronic Frontier Foundation
