= Error level analysis =

Analysis of compression artifacts in digital data with lossy compression

Error level analysis (ELA) is the analysis of compression artifacts in digital data with lossy compression such as JPEG.

== Principles ==
When used, lossy compression is normally applied uniformly to a set of data, such as an image, resulting in a uniform level of compression artifacts.

Alternatively, the data may consist of parts with different levels of compression artifacts. This difference may arise from the different parts having been repeatedly subjected to the same lossy compression a different number of times, or the different parts having been subjected to different kinds of lossy compression. A difference in the level of compression artifacts in different parts of the data may therefore indicate that the data has been edited.

In the case of JPEG, even a composite with parts subjected to matching compressions will have a difference in the compression artifacts.

In order to make the typically faint compression artifacts more readily visible, the data to be analyzed is subjected to an additional round of lossy compression, this time at a known, uniform level, and the result is subtracted from the original data under investigation. The resulting difference image is then inspected manually for any variation in the level of compression artifacts. In 2007, N. Krawetz denoted this method "error level analysis".

Additionally, digital data formats such as JPEG sometimes include metadata describing the specific lossy compression used. If in such data the observed compression artifacts differ from those expected from the given metadata description, then the metadata may not describe the actual compressed data, and thus indicate that the data have been edited.

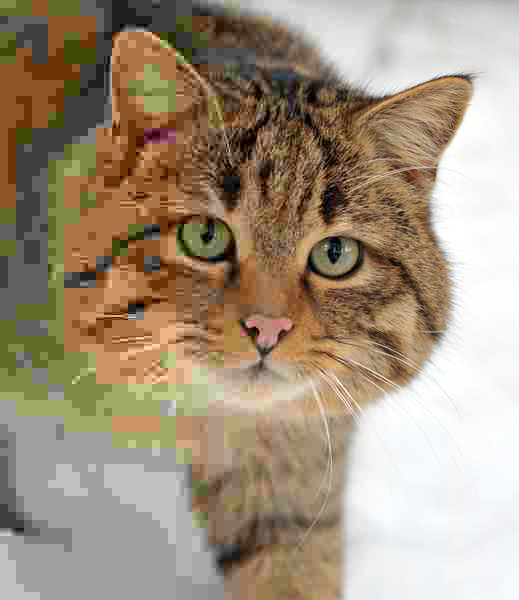
A composite image, where the different parts have different JPEG compression levels

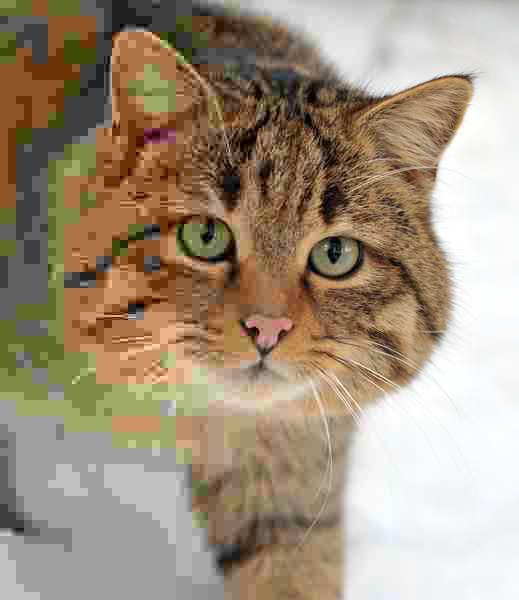
The same image with a uniform 90% quality JPEG compression

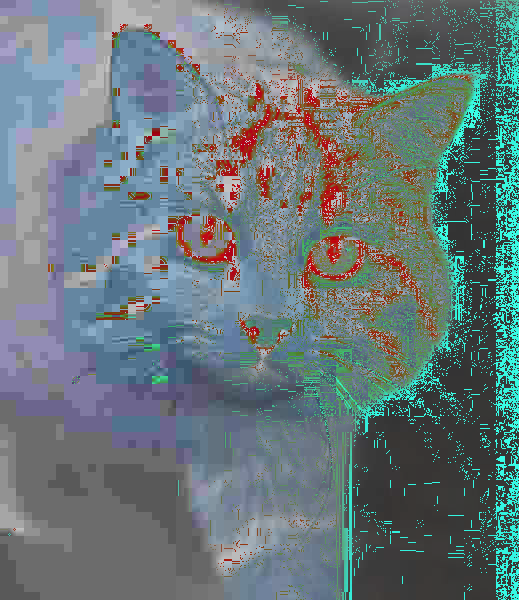
The difference between the two images shows a variation of the JPEG compression artifacts

== Limitations ==
By its nature, data without lossy compression, such as a PNG image, cannot be subjected to error level analysis. Consequently, since editing could have been performed on data without lossy compression with lossy compression applied uniformly to the edited, composite data, the presence of a uniform level of compression artifacts does not rule out editing of the data.

Additionally, any non-uniform compression artifacts in a composite may be removed by subjecting the composite to repeated, uniform lossy compression. Also, if the image color space is reduced to 256 colors or less, for example, by conversion to GIF, then error level analysis will generate useless results.

More significant, the actual interpretation of the level of compression artifacts in a given segment of the data is subjective, and the determination of whether editing has occurred is therefore not robust.

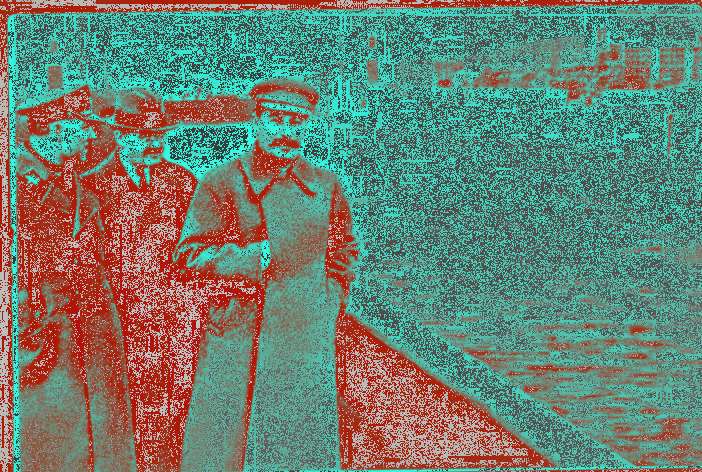
As such, the JPEG compression artifacts whether deemed uniform or not are unrelated to the Soviet-era photo manipulation

== Controversy ==
In May 2013, Dr Neal Krawetz used error level analysis on the 2012 World Press Photo of the Year and concluded on his Hacker Factor blog that it was "a composite" with modifications that "fail to adhere to the acceptable journalism standards used by Reuters, Associated Press, Getty Images, National Press Photographer's Association, and other media outlets". The World Press Photo organizers responded by letting two independent experts analyze the image files of the winning photographer and subsequently confirmed the integrity of the files. One of the experts, Hany Farid, said about error level analysis that "It incorrectly labels altered images as original and incorrectly labels original images as altered with the same likelihood". Krawetz responded by clarifying that "It is up to the user to interpret the results. Any errors in identification rest solely on the viewer".

In May 2015, the citizen journalism team Bellingcat wrote that error level analysis revealed that the Russian Ministry of Defense had edited satellite images related to the Malaysia Airlines Flight 17 disaster. In a reaction to this, image forensics expert Jens Kriese said about error level analysis: "The method is subjective and not based entirely on science", and that it is "a method used by hobbyists". On his Hacker Factor Blog, the inventor of error level analysis Neal Krawetz criticized both Bellingcat's use of error level analysis as "misinterpreting the results" but also on several points Jens Kriese's "ignorance" regarding error level analysis.

== See also ==
- Image analysis
