= PhotoDNA =

Image identification technology

PhotoDNA is a perceptual hashing algorithm widely used for image-identification and content filtering by online service providers. Although the design of the algorithm has never been publicly disclosed by its authors, a leaked software library that implements it became accessible through a repository on GitHub in 2021.

== History ==
PhotoDNA was developed by Microsoft Research and Hany Farid, professor at Dartmouth College, beginning in 2009. From a database of known images and video files, it creates unique hashes to represent each image, which can then be used to identify other instances of those images.

The hashing method initially relied on converting images into a black-and-white format, dividing them into squares, and quantifying the shading of the squares, did not employ facial recognition technology, nor could it identify a person or object in the image. The method sought to be resistant to alterations in the image, including resizing and minor color alterations. Since 2015, similar methods are used for individual video frames in video files.

Microsoft donated the PhotoDNA technology to Project VIC, managed and supported by the International Centre for Missing & Exploited Children (ICMEC) and used as part of digital forensics operations by storing "fingerprints" that can be used to uniquely identify an individual photo. The database includes hashes for millions of items.

In December 2014, Microsoft made PhotoDNA available to qualified organizations in a software as a service model for free through the Azure Marketplace.

In the 2010s and 2020s, PhotoDNA was put forward in connection with policy proposals relating to content moderation and internet censorship, including US Senate hearings (2019 on "digital responsibility", 2022 on the EARN IT Act) and various proposals by the European Commission dubbed "upload filters" by civil society such as so-called voluntary codes (in 2016 on hate speech after 2015 events, 2018 and 2022 on disinformation), copyright legislation (chiefly the 2019 copyright directive debated between 2014 and 2021), terrorism-related regulations (TERREG) and internet wiretapping regulations (2021 "chat control").

In 2016, Hany Farid proposed to extend usage of the technology to terrorism-related content. In December 2016, Facebook, Twitter, Google and Microsoft announced plans to use PhotoDNA to remove extremist content such as terrorist recruitment videos or violent terrorist imagery. In 2018 Facebook stated that PhotoDNA was used to automatically remove al-Qaeda videos.

By 2019, big tech companies including Microsoft, Facebook and Google publicly announced that since 2017 they were running the GIFCT as a shared database of content to be automatically censored. As of 2021, Apple was thought to be using NeuralHash for similar purposes.

In 2022, The New York Times covered the story of two dads whose Google accounts were closed after photos they took of their child for medical purposes were automatically uploaded to Google's servers. The article compares PhotoDNA, which requires a database of known hashes, with Google's AI-based technology, which can recognize previously unseen exploitative images.

== Usage ==
As a hashing algorithm, PhotoDNA is now used for multiple types of image-based online abuse including CSAM detection and detection of non-consensual intimate imagery. Microsoft originally used PhotoDNA on its own services including Bing and OneDrive. As of 2022, PhotoDNA was widely used by online service providers for their content moderation efforts including Google's Gmail, Twitter, Facebook, Adobe Systems, Reddit, and Discord.

The UK Internet Watch Foundation, which has been compiling a reference database of PhotoDNA signatures, reportedly had over 300,000 hashes of known child sexual exploitation materials. The National Center for Missing & Exploited Children (NCMEC) maintains hash databases using the PhotoDNA format as well as others such as PDQ, MD5, and SHA-1.

PhotoDNA is widely used to identify known illegal content, disable accounts, and report individuals to investigative organizations.

== Access ==
Access to PhotoDNA is limited due to the sensitive nature of the technology. Online platforms and law enforcement agencies can apply for access through Microsoft, or through organizations allowed to sublicense the technology. The Technology Coalition provides access for members and non-member online platforms, and Kindred Tech offers PhotoDNA for law enforcement agencies.

== See also ==
- Content moderation
- Internet filter
- Online child abuse
- Technology Coalition
