= Global Internet Forum to Counter Terrorism =

Internet industry initiative

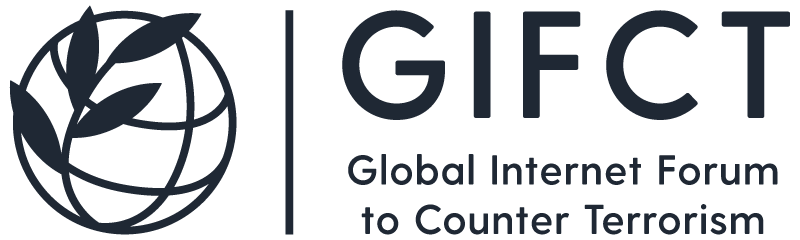
Logo

The Global Internet Forum to Counter Terrorism (GIFCT) is an Internet industry initiative to share proprietary information and technology for automated content moderation.

== History ==
Founded in 2017 by a consortium of companies spearheaded by Facebook (now known as Meta), Google/YouTube, Microsoft and Twitter (now known as X), it was created as an organization in 2019 and its membership has expanded to include 18 companies as of the end of 2021. The GIFCT began as a shared hash database of ISIS-related material but expanded to included a wider array of violent extremist content in the wake of the attack on two mosques in Christchurch, New Zealand that was live streamed on Facebook.

Members include Microsoft, Meta Platforms (Facebook, Instagram and WhatsApp), YouTube, Twitter, Airbnb, Discord, Dropbox, LinkedIn, Amazon, Mailchimp, Pinterest, JustPaste.it, Tumblr, WordPress.com and Zoom.

GIFCT maintains a database of perceptual hashes of terrorism-related videos and images that is submitted by its members, and which other members can voluntarily use to block the same material on their platforms. The material indexed includes images, videos and will be expanded to include URLs and textual data such as manifestos and other documents.

== Global Network on Extremism and Technology ==
The Global Network on Extremism and Technology (GNET) is described as the "academic research arm of GIFCT". It is a collaboration of several academic research centers, led by the International Centre for the Study of Radicalisation and Political Violence at King's College London.

== Criticism ==
Evelyn Douek of the Knight First Amendment Institute at Columbia University, writing for the Institute website in 2020, and Emma Llansó, the Director of Center for Democracy & Technology’s Free Expression Project, writing in Techdirt in 2020, described GIFCT as a "content cartel" similar to YouTube's Content ID, and a potential tool for "cross-platform censorship". GIFCT was questioned in a joint letter by human rights groups on removals of evidence of war crimes.

== Accusations of misuse ==
In 2022, Facebook, Inc., a subsidiary of Meta Platforms, was subject to a subpoena about GIFCT usage as OnlyFans was alleged to have used GIFCT to harm competitors by getting their content and accounts censored on Instagram. Facebook and OnlyFans have described these allegations as being "without merit".

== See also ==
- Tech Against Terrorism
- Internet Watch Foundation
- PhotoDNA
- Content filtering
