= ICT4peace =

Nonprofit foundation

ICT4peace is a policy and capacity-building oriented international foundation. The purpose is to save lives and protect human dignity through Information and Communication Technology (ICT). The Foundation promotes cybersecurity and a peaceful cyberspace through international negotiations with governments, companies and non-state actors. It also explores and champions the use ICTs to facilitate communication between peoples, communities and stakeholders involved in humanitarian or conflict-related crisis management and crisis mapping, humanitarian assistance and peacebuilding. It is registered as ICT for Peace in the Geneva business directory.

ICT4peace is supported by governments and philanthropic foundations and proposes analysis and counselling services as well as capacity-building programs. It works closely with the United Nations (UN) in strengthening the organisation’s capacities to map, share and use data across its various agencies and locations and by contributing to the creation of best practices in Crisis Information Management across the organisation. ICT4peace intervened for instance in the project "Strengthening Crisis Information and Management at the United Nations", described in the UN Secretary general report of 5 October 2010 on ICTs in the United Nations (A/65/491).

The way early warning systems help reduce the human cost of earthquakes, ICT-based platform can help save lives during natural or man-made disasters, said ICT4peace founder, Daniel Stauffacher, former Ambassador and Special Representative of the Swiss Government for the first phase of the World Summit on Information Society (WSIS 1), which took place in Geneva in 2003.

ICT4peace also called for international norms of responsible state behaviour and disarmament negotiations for a peaceful cyberspace.

== Origin ==
Although the idea of considering the use of ICTs in promoting peace was mentioned in the lead-up to WSIS 1, in particular by Maurice Strong, senior advisor to United Nations Secretary General Kofi Annan, the topic was left out from WSIS 1.

In the run-off to the WSIS 2nd phase (WSIS 2), that took place in November 2005 in Tunisia, the UN published the document "Information and Communication Technology for Peace, the role of ICT in Preventing, Responding to and Recovering from conflict". This document presented the ICT4peace project, that began in 2004 and formed part of Switzerland’s contribution to WSIS 2.

The project aim was to explore and map the possible uses of ICTs in the field of prevention of conflicts, peace building and post conflict reconstruction. Crisis situations such as natural disaster were also considered for their similarities with conflicts situations.

Subsequently WSIS 2 in The Tunis Commitment for the Information Society adopted para 36 and valued "the potential of ICTs to promote peace and to prevent conflict which, inter alia, negatively affects achieving development goals. ICTs can be used for identifying conflict situations through early-warning systems preventing conflicts, promoting their peaceful resolution, supporting humanitarian action, including protection of civilians in armed conflicts, facilitating peacekeeping missions, and assisting post conflict peace-building and reconstruction".

== Collaboration with the United Nations ==
In October 2006, under the Communities of Expertise (CoE) established within the framework of the Global Alliance for Information and Communication Technologies and Development (also known as Global Alliance for ICT and Development or GAID), the ICT4peace Foundation was invited to a partnership with the UN Department of Economic and Social Affairs (DESA) and GAID. The Foundation’s role is that of a focal point for overseeing and promoting the spirit of Paragraph 36 of the WSIS Tunis Commitment.

The Foundation also participates as a co-host and facilitator in the annual Meeting of the UN Crisis Information Management Advisory Group (CiMAG), which is reviewing and supporting progress of the UN Crisis Information Management Strategy (CiMS). The CiMS aims at helping all actors, including the UN’s member states and agencies, in dealing with all stages of a crisis lifecycle more efficiently and effectively. ICT4peace also supports and intervenes in both in the annual Crisis Mappers Conference and BuildPeace Conference.

A full list of ICT4peace publications is available on the website of the ETH Zurich International Security Network.
