= Online child abuse =

Child abuse committed online

Online child abuse is a unique form of child abuse that is committed, facilitated, or amplified through digital technologies, including the internet, mobile devices, online games, and social media platforms. It includes conduct from cyberbullying and online harassment as well as coercion to self-harm, grooming, sexual extortion, the production and distribution of child sexual abuse material (CSAM), and the live-streaming of contact sexual abuse. Such abuse may not happen face-to-face, nor does it necessarily require physical contact, but may overlap into real-world offline harm. The scale of online child abuse has grown substantially alongside internet access.

== Forms of online child abuse ==
=== Online harassment and cyberbullying ===
Cyberbullying is the repeated use of digital platforms to threaten, humiliate, or socially exclude another person. Unlike traditional bullying, it can follow a child home and persist around the clock, and material can be screenshotted, reshared, and resurfaced long after the original incident. The 2021/2022 WHO Health Behaviour in School-aged Children study, surveying more than 279,000 adolescents across 44 countries in Europe, Central Asia, and Canada, found that around one in six had experienced cyberbullying, with rates rising between 2018 and 2022. Targeted harassment of an individual child, including doxxing, coordinated abuse by multiple people, and identity-based attacks, can take place alongside or independently of bullying.

=== Coercion to self-harm ===
A distinct and growing form of online abuse involves perpetrators, sometimes operating in organized online networks, who manipulate children into self-harm, suicide, or harming others on camera. Perpetrators typically target vulnerable teens through gaming platforms, social media, and messaging apps, groom them by building up trust and a perceived relationship, then use blackmail, ideological framing, or sadistic role-play to escalate demands. The United States' FBI and the United Kingdom's National Crime Agency have issued joint warnings about networks known by names including "764" and "The Com," which they describe as deliberately seeking to traumatize youth. Canada has added 764 to its list of terrorist organizations.

=== Online child sexual exploitation and abuse ===
Online child sexual exploitation and abuse (OCSEA) covers conduct in which a child is sexually abused or exploited through digital means, whether the abuse is wholly online or extends into offline contact.

==== Grooming ====
Child grooming is the process by which an offender builds trust with a child, often through chat platforms, online games, or social media, in order to facilitate sexual abuse, the production of imagery, or in-person contact. Grooming frequently involves the solicitation of intimate images, child sexual abuse media (CSAM), in which an offender persuades or pressures a child to produce sexual images or videos of themselves; once obtained, this imagery is often used for further coercion.

==== Sextortion ====
Sexual blackmail, also called sexual extortion or sextortion, is the use of threats to release intimate imagery in order to coerce a person into producing further imagery, paying money, or engaging in further sexual activity. Financially motivated sextortion of adolescent boys, in which offenders pose as peers to obtain images and then demand payment, has been identified as a rapidly growing pattern and has been linked to a number of teenage suicides.

==== Online-facilitated child trafficking ====
Online platforms are used at multiple stages of child trafficking for recruiting, advertising, and logistics. Traffickers use social media, dating applications, and messaging platforms to recruit children, and advertise victims on classified sites and dark web forums. Livestreamed child sexual abuse is the real-time transmission of contact abuse over the internet, and is often arranged across borders and paid for through remittance services or cryptocurrency, with the Philippines identified as a particular hub.

==== Child sexual abuse material ====
Child sexual abuse material (CSAM) refers to visual depictions of a real child engaged in sexual activity, or of a child's sexual parts for sexual purposes. CSAM may be produced by an adult during contact abuse, coerced from a child during grooming or sextortion, or self-generated and subsequently shared without consent. Once produced, CSAM is widely traded online, and its continued circulation can revictimize and harm the child for years after the original abuse. The scale of CSAM circulation is documented through hotline data: in 2024, the National Center for Missing & Exploited Children (NCMEC) received 20.5 million reports of suspected child sexual exploitation through its CyberTipline, representing 29.2 million individual incidents and containing nearly 63 million images, videos, and other files, of which 84% resolved to activity outside the United States. In the same year, the Internet Watch Foundation (IWF) confirmed 291,273 webpages containing CSAM, with 62% traced to hosting services in European Union member states, and the INHOPE global hotline network processed nearly 2.5 million records of suspected CSAM traced to 86 countries.

== Online harassment and cyberbullying ==
Online harassment of children includes a range of behavior including cyberbullying, coordinated pile-ons called dogpiles, identity-based attacks, doxxing, and the non-consensual sharing of intimate images. Cyberbullying, the repeated use of digital platforms to harass, humiliate, or socially exclude a specific target, is the most extensively researched form. Unlike traditional bullying, it is not bounded by physical proximity or school hours: harmful content can be screenshotted, shared, and resurfaced indefinitely, and a child may be targeted simultaneously by multiple people across multiple platforms. Girls and young women are disproportionately targeted by sexual harassment and coordinated pile-ons involving large numbers of strangers simultaneously, a scale of victimization with no offline equivalent. Identity-based harassment targeting children on the basis of race, religion, disability, or sexual orientation has been documented across platforms in regions around the world, and frequently intersects with bullying and discrimination in the physical world.

=== Prevalence ===
Cyber-bullying is especially prevalent among children as an extension of bullying within schools and has been documented across all world regions. A 2019 poll conducted by UNICEF and the United Nations Special Representative of the Secretary-General on Violence against Children, drawing on responses from more than 170,000 young people aged 13-24 across 30 countries in Africa, Asia, Latin America, and Europe, found that one in three reported having been a victim of online bullying, with one in five saying they had skipped school as a result; 34 per cent of respondents in sub-Saharan Africa reported online bullying victimization, a rate comparable to those recorded in other regions.

=== Effects ===
Cyberbullying is associated with a range of adverse mental health outcomes. A 2024 systematic review of 32 studies involving nearly 30,000 students found that cyber-victimization was significantly associated with depression, anxiety, psychological stress, and suicidal behavior across the majority of studies examined. Children who experience cyberbullying are more likely to also experience or perpetrate bullying in physical school settings, and the combination of online and offline victimization is associated with worse outcomes than either alone.

== Coercion to self-harm ==
A distinct form of online child abuse involves people who manipulate children into self-harm or suicide through digital means. This occurs both in organized networks and in individual cases, including peer or intimate partner coercion through private messaging, a pattern that has resulted in criminal prosecutions in the United States, United Kingdom, Germany, Australia, and Canada. Unlike cyberbullying between peers, coercion to self-harm is characterized by the deliberate targeting of vulnerable teens, the building of a relationship of false trust akin to grooming, and the use of blackmail, escalating psychological pressure, or ideological framing to coerce harmful acts on camera or self-destructive behavior.

This behavior has been documented in connection with organized global networks now formally categorized by the United States Department of Justice as Nihilistic Violent Extremism (NVE), a term that emerged in federal court filings in early 2025. The 764 network, which emerged in 2021 from the earlier CVLT network and operates primarily through Discord and Telegram, is among the most documented groupings within this ecosystem, with victims identified across the United States, United Kingdom, Germany, Australia, Finland, Sweden, and Canada, among other countries. Members have been documented coercing children, usually aged 8 to 17, with a focus on those from marginalized backgrounds or with existing mental health difficulties, into producing child sexual abuse material and images of self-harm, using per-victim dossiers of coerced imagery and personal information as ongoing leverage to prevent disclosure. As of December 2025, the FBI reported more than 350 active investigations connected to 764 and related nihilist violent extremist groups, with victims estimated to number in the thousands globally. Canada became the first country to designate 764 as a terrorist entity in December 2025, alongside Maniac Murder Cult and the Terrorgram Collective; the UK has prosecuted 764-linked offenders under terrorism legislation; and New Zealand and Australia have made comparable designations of associated networks.

== Online child sexual exploitation and abuse ==
=== Grooming ===
Grooming is a method used by offenders that involves building trust with a child in order to gain access to and time alone with them, with the goal of facilitating sexual abuse, the production of CSAM, or in-person contact. When grooming occurs online it is frequently done without the knowledge of any trusted adult in the child's life. A significant proportion of online grooming is carried out by individuals already known to the child offline, including acquaintances, family friends, and trusted adults, who use the internet to strengthen that relationship for future exploitation or lie about their identity to forge a relationship. Individual groomers can be of any sex, gender, or age and often use social media platforms, chat rooms, photo-sharing apps, dating apps, or gaming sites to make initial contact with potential victims. The platforms used vary by region: in Latin America, Facebook and WhatsApp are the most commonly documented contact points, while in Southeast Asia and Eastern Africa mobile messaging applications predominate, reflecting differences in platform penetration and internet access patterns. Perpetrators actively study the vulnerabilities and needs of individual children, adapting their strategies so that the child feels like a willing participant rather than a victim.

Groomers employ a range of techniques to establish and maintain contact. Compliments and trust-building language are used consistently to create a sense of special connection with the target before escalating to sexual content. Groomers frequently create false profiles to build a more trustworthy persona, a practice known as catfishing. A common technique is "off-platforming", where groomers move conversations from larger, more moderated platforms to private messaging applications or end-to-end encrypted environments where detection is more difficult. Two-thirds of children surveyed in one study had been asked to move from a public forum to a private conversation on a different platform, and high-risk grooming situations have been documented developing in social gaming environments in as little as 19 seconds. Where grooming involves the solicitation of intimate or sexual media, that material is frequently used for blackmail or extortion.

==== Prevalence ====
Online grooming affects children across all world regions, though prevalence estimates vary widely depending on country, age group, and how grooming is defined and measured. In the United States, 5.4% of a nationally representative population sample reported lifetime online grooming by adults, with higher rates among female and LGBTQ+ respondents. Across 13 countries in Southeast Asia and Eastern and Southern Africa, between 1% and 20% of children encountered some form of online child sexual exploitation and abuse in the preceding year, with grooming identified as a primary mechanism. In Latin America, three in four children surveyed were unaware of the term "grooming," suggesting that low awareness may increase vulnerability in countries where the phenomenon is less publicly recognized. More than six in ten children with internet access interact daily with people unknown to them offline, with children across all world regions identifying online grooming as a significant concern. Recorded cases are considered to represent a small fraction of actual incidence, as victims frequently do not disclose due to shame, fear of disbelief, or the perpetrator's use of secrecy.

==== Effects ====
Victims of online grooming commonly experience depression, anxiety, and post-traumatic stress, with effects that can persist into adulthood. Victims are often manipulated into believing they consented to or were responsible for the abuse, which delays disclosure and complicates recovery. Where grooming results in the production of sexual imagery, its continued circulation constitutes an ongoing harm independent of the original abuse. Nearly one-quarter of children have stayed in contact with someone online who made them uncomfortable and LGBTQ+ youth are more than twice as likely to remain in contact in those circumstances.

=== Sextortion ===
Sextortion is the threatened release of intimate or sexual imagery to coerce a victim into producing further imagery, paying money, or engaging in sexual activity. In the context of child abuse, it typically results either from a grooming relationship in which a perpetrator has solicited imagery from a child, or from deceptive contact in which an offender poses as a peer to obtain images before revealing their intent. There are two main types of sextortion: sexually motivated sextortion, in which the perpetrator seeks ongoing access to imagery or sexual contact, and financially motivated sextortion, in which the perpetrator demands payment to suppress images already obtained.

==== Prevalence ====
Sextortion of children increased sharply following the COVID-19 pandemic, as children's online activity expanded and organized criminal networks accelerated their exploitation of online platforms for financial gain. Reports of financial sextortion to the NCMEC CyberTipline rose from 139 in 2021 to 10,731 in 2022 and 26,718 in 2023. Between October 2021 and March 2023, the FBI and Homeland Security Investigations received more than 13,000 reports of online financial sextortion of minors involving at least 12,600 victims, predominantly boys, linked to at least 20 suicides. Prevalence rates among youth in empirical studies range from 0.7% to 5.0%, with young people and sexual minorities more likely to be victimized.

Financially motivated sextortion targeting adolescent boys is predominantly perpetrated by organized criminal networks operating from West Africa, particularly Nigeria and Côte d'Ivoire, and Southeast Asia, including the Philippines. These networks use scripted messaging to target large numbers of children simultaneously across social media platforms, moving from initial contact to blackmail in under an hour. Law enforcement agencies in Kenya, Ghana, and Nigeria have worked with international partners to investigate and arrest suspected perpetrators.

==== Effects ====
Victims of sextortion commonly experience shame, fear, suicidal ideation, anxiety, and depression. Perpetrators frequently share contact details of the victim's family and friends to amplify pressure. Financial sextortion has been linked to suicide among teen boys in the United States, Canada, the United Kingdom, and Australia. In some documented cases, victims died within hours of initial contact. Some perpetrators continue demands after payment, escalating pressure until victims are unable or unwilling to comply.

=== Child sexual abuse material ===
Child sexual abuse material (CSAM) refers to visual depictions of a child engaged in sexual activity or of a child's sexual parts for sexual purposes. The term replaced "child pornography" in practitioner and legislative usage to reflect that such material is a record of abuse rather than consensual adult content. CSAM is produced in a range of contexts: during contact abuse by an adult, coerced from a child through grooming or sextortion, within families, and self-generated by adolescents and subsequently shared without consent. Reports of CSAM increased by an average of 50% per year over the two decades to 2019, with a further spike during the COVID-19 pandemic as offenders increased consumption, distribution, and production.

==== Detection ====
Platforms detect CSAM through a combination of hash-matching, machine-learning classifiers, and human review. Hashing algorithms like PhotoDNA, developed by Dr. Hany Farid and Microsoft in 2009, or PDQ, developed and open sourced by Meta in 2019, generate a digital fingerprint of a known CSAM image that can be compared against new uploads at scale without exposing content to reviewers. Both algorithms are used by NCMEC to provide hashes of verified CSAM so online platforms can detect, report, and remove detected matches. Hash-matching identifies only previously catalogued material, so machine-learning classifiers are often used alongside it to surface novel CSAM that has not yet been hashed. Human review remains a necessary final step before reports are submitted to authorities, a role associated with significant occupational health consequences for content moderators. The Tech Coalition, whose members include many large online platforms, coordinates voluntary CSAM detection commitments across the industry.

==== Effects ====
The harms of CSAM extend beyond the original abuse. Once produced, material circulates persistently online and revictimizes the children depicted each time it is seen. Individual children's imagery has been documented viewed millions of times across platforms and investigations spanning decades. In a 2024 study of 281 CSAM survivors, 75% reported worrying constantly about being recognized from their abuse imagery. Of those who had been recognized, 95% experienced further harassment or abuse as a result. CSAM offenders frequently stalk and harass victims whose material they have obtained. Children experience a nearly 50% greater psychological impact when an online component is involved in their abuse, reflecting the compounding effect of digital distribution on trauma.

==== AI-generated CSAM ====
A growing subset of CSAM involves content generated or manipulated by generative AI. AI-generated CSAM (AIG-CSAM) ranges from fully synthetic depictions of fictional children to "morphed" imagery in which an existing photograph of a real child is modified to appear sexually explicit, and is produced using commercially available tools including so-called "nudify" or "undress" applications. The Internet Watch Foundation identified over 20,000 suspected AI-generated CSAM images on a single dark web forum within one month in 2023, 27% of which were classified as illegal under UK law. AIG-CSAM also circulates on social media, content-sharing sites, and subscription-based platforms.

Statistics on AIG-CSAM volumes remain contested. The NCMEC CyberTipline's "Generative AI" reporting field can encompass both AI-generated material and known CSAM discovered while scanning AI training datasets, making reported figures an unreliable measure of AIG-CSAM specifically. Researchers at Stanford's Center for Internet and Society raised this ambiguity formally with NCMEC in 2026 after it emerged that the majority of one major platform's reports contained no AI-generated material whatsoever, and actually consisted of known CSAM found in datasets used to train AI models. AIG-CSAM presents unique detection challenges nonetheless: hash-matching identifies only known content, meaning novel synthetic material typically evades detection until independently reported, and the legal treatment of fully synthetic imagery not derived from a real child varies across jurisdictions. In 2024, eleven generative AI developers publicly committed to Safety by Design principles to guard against the creation and spread of AIG-CSAM.

== Sexual abuse ==
Online sexual abuse is a relatively modern trend, in which perpetrators utilize modern forms of technology such as live stream web cameras, cell phones, or social media to coerce targeted victims into inappropriate and sometimes illegal sex acts. Abusers do not discriminate and target victims of every walk of life. Online sexual abuse differs from other forms of sexual abuse in that it can be perpetrated stealthily on a global scale, allowing the offender to evade capture. At the same time, technology offers predators greater opportunities to find the youth that they prey upon. Children are often the targets of online sexual predators who will often bully, emotionally manipulate, blackmail, or befriend willing communicators on the web in order to obtain their desires. Online sexual abuse may vary from personal interactions between a victim and offender to a more mechanized process, in which children are sexually exploited for the perpetrators' profit. Online sexual predators often target young victims, with a study showing that 13% of children receive negative unwanted attention of a sexual nature on the Internet. Predators make contact with prospective targets in a variety of settings, although the most prolific place that predators troll is chat rooms, where 76% of known first encounters with online sexual predators occur. Predators troll chat rooms and other forms of social media like MySpace or Facebook, seeking people who outwardly share personal information.

Detection and deterrence of online sexual abuse are difficult because of the anonymous nature of the Internet; however, stopping and detecting an online predator's criminal activity is the task of various government organizations like the Federal Bureau of Investigation (FBI). The FBI's Violent Crimes Against Children Program was specifically created, "...to provide a rapid, proactive, and comprehensive counter to all threats of abuse and exploitation of children" in its jurisdiction. The FBI accomplishes quick response times by having agents scouring the Internet in search of perpetrators; they ask for information in forums and chat-rooms and look for the telltale signs of abusive behavior in the children they interact with. Online sexual predators, however, are often difficult to distinguish because they show a misleading representation of themselves to avoid incriminating evidence. Rather than relying completely on authorities to apprehend the perpetrators of online sexual abuse, one may decrease the chances of unwanted and unsolicited advances from online predators by keeping one's intimately private details off of the Internet. Another way to avoid unwanted sexual solicitations is to ignore, block, and report an offender to the website's management staff.

=== Examples ===
Online abuse often manifests itself in physical and psychological harm to victims, as previously stated. In recent history, Larry Nassar, a USA Gymnastics team doctor, was charged with 60 years in federal prison when he pleaded guilty to charges related to receiving child pornography, possessing child pornography, and destroying and concealing evidence relating to child pornography. Prosecutors have stated that a supremely close link between his child pornography activities had directly impacted his repeat, "molestation of children". At the height of his child pornography obsession, Nassar had thousands of pictures of underage children. In the wake of this scandal, affecting hundreds of women of a variety of ages, reforms have been made to further combat future occurrences of this abuse by USA Gymnastics and Michigan State University. Also gathering a large following in the wake of this scandal is the Me Too movement.

The murder of Kacie Woody occurred after 13-year-old Woody had befriended who she thought was a 17-year-old boy named Dave Fagen via Yahoo! Messenger, but in reality this person was a 47-year-old pedophile named David Fuller. After grooming Woody through the social network, Fuller traveled to Woody's home in rural Holland, Arkansas and abducted her. After Woody was reported missing and an investigation was launched, Arkansas law enforcement and FBI agents located Woody and Fuller's bodies in a storage unit in Conway. Fuller had bound and raped Woody inside his rented minivan in the unit before shooting her in the head, and shot himself in the head before officers could arrest him.

== Legal frameworks ==
=== International ===
International legal responses to online child abuse are grounded in the UN Convention on the Rights of the Child and its Optional Protocol on child sexual exploitation, which oblige signatory states to criminalize the production, distribution, and possession of CSAM and to establish mechanisms for international cooperation. The Budapest Convention on Cybercrime, adopted by the Council of Europe in 2001 and ratified by states beyond Europe including the United States, Japan, and several African and Latin American countries, provides the primary international treaty framework for criminalizing computer-facilitated offenses including CSAM and coordinating cross-border law enforcement cooperation.

=== Cyberbullying and online harassment ===
Cyberbullying is not directly criminalized at the federal level in the United States in the absence of a sexual element; most states have enacted anti-bullying statutes, though these vary significantly in scope and enforcement. In the United Kingdom, cyberbullying may engage the Malicious Communications Act 1988 and the Communications Act 2003, with the Online Safety Act 2023 imposing additional platform-level duties to address harassment of children.

=== Coercion to self-harm ===
Legal coverage around coercion to self-harm has not been clearly defined in most jurisdictions. Where perpetrators produce or solicit CSAM during abuse, existing child exploitation statutes apply. Terrorism legislation provides further basis for prosecution when networks designated as terrorist organizations are involved, as with 764 in Canada and the United Kingdom. Standalone coercion to suicide through private messaging has been prosecuted under reckless endangerment and involuntary manslaughter statutes in the United States and equivalent provisions elsewhere, but no jurisdiction has enacted legislation specifically targeting this type of online child abuse.

=== Country-level frameworks ===
In the United States, CSAM production, distribution, and possession are federal offenses under 18 U.S.C. § 2251 and § 2252, carrying mandatory minimum sentences. Online enticement and grooming are criminalized under § 2422(b); and platforms are required under 18 U.S.C. § 2258A to report apparent CSAM to the NCMEC CyberTipline when they become aware of it. The REPORT Act (2024) expanded mandatory reporting obligations to include online enticement and child sex trafficking for the first time. Investigations are coordinated through the Internet Crimes Against Children Task Force Program(ICAC), a network in the US of 61 task forces involving federal, state, and local law enforcement agencies. In the United Kingdom, the Online Safety Act 2023 imposes a statutory duty of care on platforms to detect, remove, and report CSAM, and requires age-appropriate design for services likely to be accessed by children. Australia's Online Safety Act 2021 established the eSafety Commissioner as an independent regulatory authority with takedown and enforcement powers over online child abuse material. Canada's national tipline Cybertip.ca, operated by the Canadian Centre for Child Protection (C3P), receives public reports of online child sexual exploitation and operates Project Arachnid, an automated web crawler that has issued more than 39 million takedown notices to online service providers globally.

India's Protection of Children from Sexual Offences Act (POCSO, 2012) criminalizes a broad range of child sexual offenses including online abuse, and its Information Technology Act addresses CSAM specifically. However, researchers have identified significant enforcement gaps arising from low digital literacy, underreporting, and resource constraints in investigating online offenses. The Philippines' Republic Act 11930 (Anti-Online Sexual Abuse and Exploitation of Children Act, 2022) specifically addresses online child sexual exploitation including livestreamed abuse, reflecting the country's particular exposure. Across sub-Saharan Africa, fewer than half of countries have comprehensive cybercrime legislation addressing online child abuse, though South Africa's Cybercrimes Act 2021 and Kenya's Computer Misuse and Cybercrimes Act 2018 represent significant developments.

Within the European Union, the legal framework for CSAM detection has been subject to ongoing legislative debate. As of April 2026 an interim ePrivacy derogation that provided legal cover for platforms to voluntarily scan for CSAM expired after the European Parliament voted not to renew it, citing concerns about compatibility with privacy rights under the EU Charter of Fundamental Rights. Child safety organizations including the Internet Watch Foundation, Snap, Google, Microsoft, and Meta warned that the lapse would lead platforms to reduce or cease voluntary CSAM detection in EU jurisdictions, creating a significant gap in child protection infrastructure at a time when 62% of confirmed CSAM webpages were hosted in EU member states. The broader Chat Control proposal, which would have mandated scanning of private messages including end-to-end encrypted communications, was blocked by the Parliament on privacy grounds.

=== Enforcement challenges ===
Across all jurisdictions, enforcement remains limited by resource constraints, jurisdictional complexity, and the transnational nature of online child abuse, in which perpetrators, victims, hosting infrastructure, and platforms are frequently located in different countries. In Global South countries, specialized police capacity for online child abuse investigations is often limited, and frontline welfare workers in most studied countries report feeling inadequately equipped to support child victims of online sexual exploitation and abuse. On average, only 3% of children who experience online sexual exploitation and abuse report it to law enforcement or a helpline, reflecting both low awareness of reporting avenues and a widespread lack of confidence that reports will result in action.

== See also ==
- Online predator
- Thorn
