= Internet abuse =

Internet abuse refers to improper use of the internet and may include:

- Cyberbullying, use of the internet to bully and intimidate.
- Cybercrime, use of computers in criminal activity e.g. hacking
- Cybersex trafficking, the live streaming of coerced sexual acts and or rape
- Internet homicide, the killing online
- Malware, software designed to harm a user's computer, including computer viruses
- Spamming, sending unwanted advertising
