= National Center for Missing & Exploited Children =

American children's rights organization

- Abbreviation: NCMEC
- Formation: June 13, 1984
- Type: 501(c)(3) nonprofit organization
- Tax ID no.: 52-1328557
- Purpose: Preventing child abduction, exploitation, and trafficking
- Headquarters: Alexandria, Virginia, U.S.
- Location: United States
- Region served: United States
- Chair: Regina Schofield
- President and CEO: Michelle DeLaune
- Website: www.missingkids.org

The National Center for Missing & Exploited Children (NCMEC; /nɛk mək/) is a private, nonprofit organization established in 1984 by the United States Congress. In September 2013, the United States House of Representatives, United States Senate, and the president of the United States reauthorized the allocation of $40 million in funding for the organization as part of Missing Children's Assistance Reauthorization Act of 2013. The current chair of the organization is Regina Schofield. NCMEC handles cases of missing minors from infancy to young adults through age 20.

== Operations ==
Primarily funded by the United States Department of Justice, the NCMEC acts as an information clearinghouse and resource for parents, children, law enforcement agencies, schools, and communities to assist in locating missing children and to raise public awareness about ways to prevent child abduction, and child sexual abuse. John Walsh, Noreen Gosch (mother of Johnny Gosch, who went missing in 1982), and others advocated establishing the center as a result of frustration stemming from a lack of resources and a national coordination between law enforcement and other government agencies.

The Center provides information to help locate children reported missing (by parental abduction, child abduction, or running away from home) and to assist physically and sexually abused children. In this resource capacity, the NCMEC distributes photographs of missing children and accepts tips and information from the public. It also coordinates these activities with numerous state and federal law enforcement agencies.

The Center not only specializes in locating missing children, but identifying the deceased. There are a number of unidentified decedents in the country, some of which are children, teenagers and young adults. Like missing children, posters are created for the cases and, if possible, show forensic facial reconstructions of the subject that show an estimation of their appearance while alive. The reconstructions that the NCMEC creates have been regarded to be state-of-the-art and have been stated to have been mistaken for photographs.

== History ==
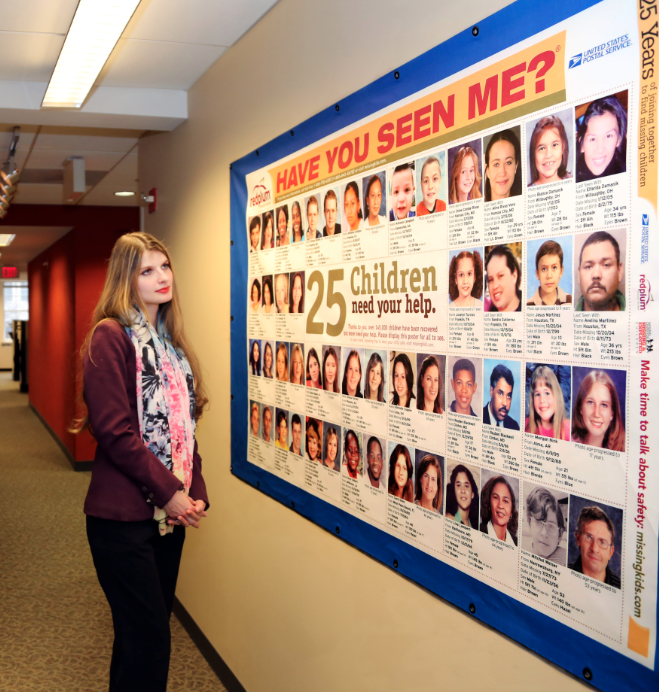
Alicia Kozakiewicz at the National Center for Missing & Exploited Children's headquarters in Alexandria, Virginia (2015)

The Center was founded in 1984, spurred by notable abductions such as the 1981 abduction and murder of six-year-old Adam Walsh from a shopping mall in Hollywood, Florida, and the 1979 abduction of six-year-old Etan Patz from New York City. Because police had the ability to record and track information about stolen cars, guns, and even horses with the FBI's national crime computer, it was believed that the same should be done to find victims and the procurers.

In 1984, the U.S. Congress passed the Missing Children's Assistance Act, which established a National Resource Center and Clearinghouse on Missing & Exploited Children. On June 13, 1984, the center, formed by Adam Walsh's parents, Revé and John Walsh, alongside other children's advocates, was officially opened by President Ronald Reagan in a White House ceremony. The national 24-hour toll-free missing children's hotline, 1-800-THE-LOST, was also established.

During the mid-to-late 1980s, the toy Teddy Ruxpin became the "Official Spokesbear" for the center at the height of his popularity. Due to this partnership, some stories featured extra information for kids to stay safe from situations such as abductions and sexual predation. This also caused his animated series to feature a clip titled "Protect Yourself" in which safety information for kids would be given by then-popular child actors.

In September 2013, the United States House of Representatives, United States Senate, and the president of the United States voted to reauthorize $40 million in funding for the organization as part of Missing Children's Assistance Reauthorization Act of 2013 (H.R. 3092; 113th Congress).

From 2011 to 2015, 45 percent of children reported missing in America were found after being missing between six and 11 months; 27 percent were found after missing from one to two years; 19 percent when missing two to five years; five percent after six to 10 years; three percent when missing from 11 to 20 years; and only one percent of missing children are found when missing for over 20 years.

On average, 49 percent of child abductions are by family members, 27 percent by acquaintances, and 24 percent by individuals unknown to the victim. Each category is dissected into areas such as victim profiling; relationship (if existent) between offender and abductee; the time and location of abduction; and degree of violence utilized to facilitate the abduction. In instances where a child has been abducted by a stranger with homicidal intent, the abduction is most likely to occur in the evening, with death most probable within three hours of the abduction.

On April 6, 2018, it was announced in Forbes magazine that the Department of Justice had seized and shut down the website Backpage.com, on the grounds that it had frequently facilitated human trafficking. NCMEC released a statement: "The National Center for Missing & Exploited Children just learned that Backpage.com was seized by the FBI, IRS, and the U.S. Postal Inspection Service with analytical assistance from the Joint Regional Intelligence Center. This is another step in the years-long fight against the exploitation of victims who were bought and sold for sex on Backpage.com. #NCMEC is waiting alongside the rest of the world to see what will come next. We stand by the victims and their families as they process this news and continue to fight for justice against those who profited from their abuse. #EndSexTrafficking." However, memos dating from 2012 written by two assistant U.S. attorneys working on behalf of the United States Department of Justice claimed that, according to witnesses, "Backpage was making substantial efforts to prevent criminal conduct on its site, that it was coordinating efforts with law enforcement agencies and NCMEC ... and that it was conducting its businesses in accordance with legal advice", that "their investigation failed "to uncover compelling evidence of criminal intent or a pattern or reckless conduct regarding minors", and that "it was their assessment that "Backpage genuinely wanted to get child prostitution off of its site." According to these documents, at the time, the former head of the NCMEC, Ernie Allen, also "believed Backpage was genuinely trying to combat underage ads".

In the 2020s, center staff supported the PROTECT Our Children Act of 2022, which passed the United States Senate on November 15, 2022, as well as Congress on December 6, 2022. The act reauthorized funding for the Internet Crimes Against Children Task Force (ICAC) and provides support to investigate and arrest perpetrators of sex offenses against children.

=== Applications to the US seeking return of children ===
Effective September 5, 1995, applications seeking the return of or access to children in the US under the Hague Convention on the Civil Aspects of International Child Abduction were processed through the NCMEC for the US Department of State, Office of Children's Issues under contract with the US Department of State and the US Department of Justice. On April 1, 2008, the US Office of Children's Issues re-assumed U.S. Central Authority duties for processing incoming cases under the Hague Abduction Convention. As a result of its status as a government contractor as well as funding provided under the Missing Children Act and Missing Children's Assistance Act, the NCMEC received (as of 2008) US$40-million funding each year from the US Government.

=== International ===
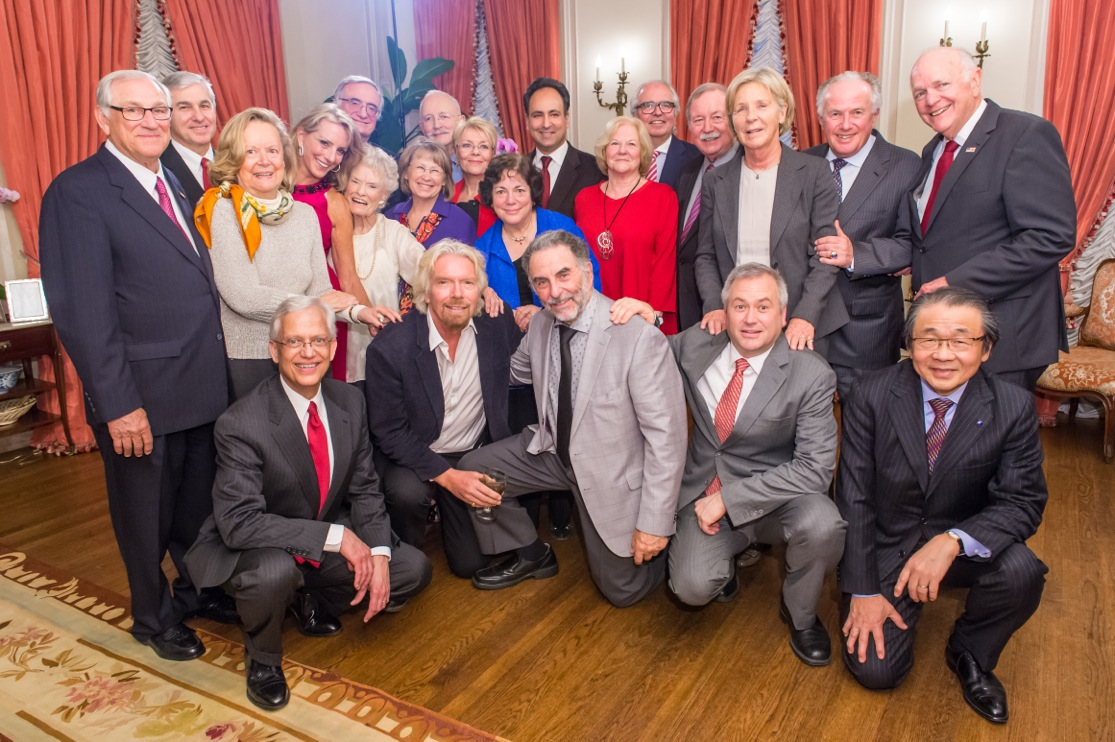
The Board of ICMEC with Sir Richard Branson and Eve Branson in April 2014

In 1998, the NCMEC Board of Directors approved the creation of a separate international organization, the International Centre for Missing & Exploited Children (ICMEC); the two now act as sister organizations. ICMEC combats child sexual exploitation, child sexual abuse, and child abduction. ICMEC held its first Board of Directors meeting in 1998. It was officially launched in April 1999.

ICMEC runs a global missing children's network of 30 countries. ICMEC has trained law enforcement personnel from 121 countries, works with law enforcement in over 100 countries, and has worked with legislatures in 100 countries to adopt new laws combating child sexual abuse. ICMEC also encourages the creation of national operational centers built on a public-private partnership model, and leads global financial and industry coalitions to eradicate child sexual exploitation and child sexual abuse. The Koons Family Institute on International Law and Policy is the International Centre's research arm. In August 2008, ICMEC was granted "Special Consultative Status" by the United Nations Economic and Social Council (ECOSOC), to assist the UN with its expertise regarding child sexual exploitation and child abduction. ICMEC also works with the intergovernmental organization INTERPOL, the inter-continental organization the Organization of American States (OAS), and the Hague Conference on Private International Law.

NCMEC is an associate of PACT Parents and Abducted Children Together in the United Kingdom.

=== iOS 15 partnership and community response ===
In 2021, the group faced criticism over a partnership with Apple to produce and implement monitoring software for iOS 15, intended to scan all users' iCloud photos uploaded as part of iCloud Photo Library using PhotoDNA, based on NCMEC's database of known child sex abuse material. The software would send any image that matched a hash value in the PhotoDNA database to human reviewers to confirm, after which a report would be made to NCMEC's Cybertipline. Users were not to be given an opportunity to opt out of the service, which was described as an unreasonable encroachment on privacy. Edward Snowden described the updated devices as "iNarcs", while the Electronic Frontier Foundation argued that such a backdoor would require little adaptation to monitor for other types of content, enabling political censorship by governments (who could potentially require Apple to enable such features once available). An editorial in The New York Times by Matthew D. Green and Alex Stamos said that, while many platforms (like Facebook, Google, and Microsoft) have screened public user uploads for a long time, Apple's promise to only evaluate photos which use its iCloud service was a policy decision, not a technological requirement limiting access to users' personal devices. In a company-wide internal letter to Apple employees in response to public opposition to the system, NCMEC’s executive director of strategic partnerships Marita Rodriguez described criticism as the "screeching voices of the minority."

== Controversies ==
=== Allegations of ignoring data about abuse of transgender children ===
In August 2024, former NCMEC board member Don McGowan criticized the organization's board in a Techdirt podcast appearance, stating that "NCMEC has data in its stat banks that say some of the kids most at risk in the world are trans kids. And they ignore that data."

=== Removal of LGBT and male victim resources ===
In February 2025, faced with the threat of losing funding from the federal government under the Trump administration, the NCMEC scrubbed all resources relating to or mentioning LGBT youth, as well as removing resources for male victims of child sex trafficking.

== CyberTipline ==
The NCMEC operates the CyberTipline, which was established by Congress to process reports of child sexual exploitation (including sexual abuse, online enticement, and contact offenses). The NCMEC reviews these reports and shares them with the appropriate law enforcement agency or Internet Crimes Against Children (ICAC) task force. In addition to the information provided by the reporting party, NCMEC typically adds geolocation information (if appropriate) and cross-references identifying information such as email address, username, or IP address with existing CyberTipline Reports.

Anyone can make a report to the CyberTipline but reporting is required for certain electronic service providers (ESP) who become aware of the presence of child sexual abuse on their systems. While ESPs are not required to actively scan for or try to detect child sexual abuse, many of them do. In 2018, the CyberTipline processed 18.4 million reports. In December 2020, NCMEC’s CyberTipline surpassed 100 million reports of suspected child sexual exploitation.

In 2024, the Revising Existing Procedures on Reporting via Technology (REPORT) Act further amended the federal reporting regime by expanding the categories of online child sexual exploitation that must be reported to NCMEC, extending the retention period for CyberTipline report data from 90 days to one year, and clarifying liability protections for NCMEC and certain vendors assisting its work.

ESPs are only shielded from legal liability for user-uploaded CSAM and child exploitation content if they report any instances they discover to NCMEC. This results in a high number of reports: in 2025, the Cybertipline received 21.3 million reports concerning 61.8 million total files. Many reports are incomplete or otherwise unactionable, either because the ESP did not have sufficiently identifying information available about the user to identify which agency to refer the report to, or the ESP's automated reporting system did not properly attach the information. In 2025, eight sites -- Meta, Amazon AI Services, TikTok, Snapchat, Discord, xAI, Grindr and Roblox -- accounted for 81% of all reports, although Amazon's reports were mostly generated from a review of the image training dataset assembled from multiple external sources and not from material uploaded to Amazon's own AWS cloud hosting and therefore they had limited additional information to provide.

Because scanning files for child sex abuse material is only legal in the United States if it's voluntary and not government-required, NCMEC is limited in how it can dictate the way ESPs conduct scans and make reports. The reporting form is also often described as outdated and difficult to use, a likely cause of many inadequate or improperly-categorized reports. In addition, 77% of 2025 reports resolved to an uploader outside the United States, meaning that NCMEC functions as a global, not just national, reporting clearinghouse.

In 2025, NCMEC categorized the reports they received as 8.6% of reports originating from the uploads of someone located in the United States, 77.1% from the uploads of someone located outside the United States, and 14.3% from the uploads of someone in an unknown location. 34.2 million of the 61.8 million files reported were novel images and videos not already included in NCMEC's PhotoDNA hash matching system to detect known CSAM. Of the 61.8 million files, NCMEC reported 24 million to local, federal, or international law enforcement in some fashion, either as "actionable" or "informational". Of those 24 million reports, NCMEC received feedback from the agency on approximately 820,000 of them: this includes feedback that the report was not helpful or would not be investigated. No count exists of how many Cybertipline reports lead to prosecution, arrest, or conviction. Many law enforcement agencies report frustrations with Cybertipline referrals because they are incomplete, poorly categorized, or (because ESPs are incentivized to err on the side of caution in reporting) obviously images of adults.

== 'Take It Down' tool ==
In February 2023, the NCMEC announced its release of the "Take it Down" tool, a free-to-use service that allows users to anonymously report and remove "nude, partially nude, or sexually explicit images or videos" of underage individuals found on social media, blocking the content from being shared. Adults who appeared in such content when they were under the age of 18 can also use the service. Meta provided the initial funding to create the service, while platforms such as Facebook, Instagram, OnlyFans, Pornhub, and Yubo have integrated the tool into their platforms.

== Publications ==
In 2007, NCMEC and Duracell produced a children's book title The Great Tomato Adventure: A Story About Smart Safety Choices, along with a series of educational tools for parents and guardians of older children called Teachable Moments Guides. The books were produced and published by Arbor Books, and the foreword was written by Jada Pinkett Smith. Both tools were introduced as an extension of the child safety program that launched in 2006. The book was made available as a free download via the Power of Parents program website.

NCMEC has also created an interactive film, "No Escape Room", for parents to understand how sextortion schemes work, and how to identify the warning signs that their child might be the target of one.

== Notable board and staff members ==
- John F. Clark, former president and CEO
- Karen Tandy, former board chair
- Revé Walsh, co-founder and chair-elect
- John Walsh, co-founder
- Dennis DeConcini, former United States senator

== See also ==
- AMBER Alert
- Association of Sites Advocating Child Protection (ASACP)
- Child abduction
- Child abduction alert system
- Child Focus
- Code Adam
- Federal Bureau of Investigation
- Financial Coalition Against Child Pornography
- International child abduction
- Kidnapping
- List of United States quangos
- National Child Victim Identification Program
- National Missing Children's Day
- United States Children's Bureau
- U.S. Secret Service
- Vanished Children's Alliance
