= 2026 Philippines school shooting =

2026 Philippines school shooting may refer to:

- 2026 Datu Usman Mampen Elementary School shooting
- 2026 Tacloban school shooting
- 2026 Zamboanga City school shooting
- 2026 South Cotabato school shooting
