= BNHS =

BNHS may refer to:

- Belfast Natural History Society, Northern Ireland
- Birmingham Natural History Society, England
- Bombay Natural History Society, India

== Schools ==
- Balayan National High School, Balayan, Batangas, Philippines
- Banga National High School, a public high school in Banga, South Cotabato, Philippines
- Bata National High School, a public high school in Bacolod, Negros Occidental, Philippines
- Belvidere North High School, Belvidere, Illinois, United States
- Byron Nelson High School, Trophy Club, Texas, United States
