= 2022 Ateneo de Manila University shooting =

Shooting incident at the Ateneo de Manila University

2022 Ateneo de Manila shooting
- The area of Areté Ateneo within the Ateneo de Manila campus, the site of the shooting, photographed in 2018
- Location: 14°38′29″N 121°4′32″E; Ateneo de Manila University, Loyola Heights, Quezon City, Philippines
- Date: July 24, 2022; 3:30 p.m. (Note: The Metropolitan Manila Development Authority (MMDA) and the police gave different times of the actual shooting. MMDA posted on Twitter that there was a shooting incident at Gate 3 of the university as of 2:55 p.m. on July 24 while the police said in a report by the Philippine Daily Inquirer that Yumol, the shooter, opened fire around 3:30 p.m.) (PST)
- Target: Former Lamitan mayor Rosita "Rose" Furigay
- Attack type: Mass shooting, school shooting, assassination
- Weapon: .45 caliber Rock Island Armory 1911 semi-automatic pistol
- Deaths: 3
- Injuries: 4 (including the perpetrator)
- Perpetrator: Chao-Tiao Yumol
- Motive: Personal conflict

On July 24, 2022, a mass shooting took place at the Ateneo de Manila University in Quezon City, Metro Manila, Philippines, leaving three people dead and three others injured, including the assailant. The attacker, identified as 38-year-old Chao-Tiao Yumol, successfully targeted former mayor Rose Furigay of Lamitan, Basilan, who was at the university to attend her daughter's graduation.

== Background ==
About an hour before the attack, a graduation ceremony was scheduled to be conducted for students of the Ateneo de Manila University School of Law. The perpetrator was able to enter the campus through a GrabTaxi car with his weapons left unchecked despite the imposition of a gun ban as part of the heightened security for President Bongbong Marcos's State of the Nation Address to occur the following day. He later blended with the crowd and waited for his target to appear.

While homicide rates are high in the Philippines, mass shootings – particularly school shootings – are not common. However, politically motivated crimes are prevalent. Federico Pascual Jr., a columnist at The Philippine Star, opined that "the Ateneo incident could be described as a mass shooting" but the Quezon City police said that the gunman "was targeting Furigay, with other victims presumably just collateral damage."

== Details ==
=== Shooting ===
At around 3:30 p.m. (UTC+08:00), on July 24, 2022, the gunman opened fire outside the university's Areté building, the venue for the graduation ceremony. Rosita Furigay was the main target of the perpetrator. She was killed along with a security guard, Jeneven Bandiala, who was attempting to thwart the gunman, and Victor George Capistrano, Furigay's executive assistant. Hannah Furigay, the former mayor's daughter who was among the graduating students, was injured. Julia Manabat, a nurse and the mother of another graduating student, was also injured. The attacker was also wounded by a gunshot fired by security guards of the university.

=== Chase and arrest ===
In an aftermath video, students and university officials were seen fleeing and screaming while others took care of the victims. The assailant escaped the crime scene by threatening a certain "Mr. Palma" and taking possession of his vehicle. After making it to Aurora Boulevard and crashing through several vehicles, he was blocked by a group of people. He then fled on foot and later, boarded a public utility mini-bus where he was eventually arrested by responding police officers as they stopped the mini-bus and demanded the suspect to get off. The police officers were tipped off by motorcycle riders that the suspect boarded public transportation.

== Perpetrator ==
Chao-Tiao Yumol, a doctor from Lamitan, was identified as the suspected attacker. Initial reports stated that the police named the suspect as Ramil Nicodemez y Hermo but it turned out that the name was merely Yumol's alias. According to the police, Yumol admitted to being the one who carried out the shooting incident. He had no permanent residence in Metro Manila and was always on the run to carry out the assassination. In 2018, a cease and desist order was issued to Yumol's clinic in Lamitan by the Bangsamoro government. Yumol was also the subject of more than 70 cyberlibel complaints filed by the Furigays over his accusations of their involvement in the drug trade and corruption. The lawyer of the Furigays denied these allegations.

The police further said that the lone suspected gunman committed the crime due to "personal motives" as he had a long history of conflict with the Furigays. They confiscated from Yumol a 9mm pistol registered under his name. Another weapon taken from Yumol, a .45 caliber pistol, was used in the shootings, although this did not belong to Yumol but to a Philippine Army officer named Jeremy Aquino. It was reported that Aquino lost the pistol in 2019 when he was assigned in Patikul, Sulu. The acting spokesperson of the Armed Forces of the Philippines, Col. Medel Aguilar, confirmed this and emphasized that no army personnel was involved in the shootings.

== Reactions ==
Several organizations and public personalities condemned the incident. President Marcos demanded an immediate investigation into the shooting. Quezon City mayor Joy Belmonte denounced the shooting, stating that "this kind of incident has no place in our society and must be condemned to the highest level" while extending condolences to the victims' families. The Philippine Red Cross dispatched eight bags of blood to the Quirino Memorial Medical Center where the injured victims were recovering.

The Ateneo de Manila University canceled the graduation ceremony for its law school students scheduled to occur hours after the shooting and pledged to assist any students, faculty, staff, and guests affected by the incident. The university's administration assured the public that "its campuses are safe" and that its security protocols "are being reviewed and strengthened further." Members of the Ateneo de Manila community also pledged to provide financial support to Bandiala's family and launched a QR code payment donation channel. Chief Justice Alexander Gesmundo, the invited commencement speaker, was in transit at the time of the shooting and "was advised to turn back." According to Supreme Court spokesperson Brian Keith Hosaka, the chief justice was safe.

== Aftermath ==
=== Legal proceedings ===
On July 25, 2022, a day after the shooting, the Quezon City Police District of the National Capital Region Police Office charged Chao Tiao Yumol with three counts of murder and attempted murder before inquest proceedings at the city prosecutor's office. Yumol was also charged with illegal possession of firearm, motor vehicle theft and malicious mischief worth ₱80,000 (around US$1,430 as of July 27, 2022).

=== Incidental events ===
The perpetrator's father, Rolando Yumol, was shot dead by two unidentified men on board a motorcycle in front of his house in Lamitan days later after the incident. The police advised the public not to speculate the attack at the Ateneo brought about the killing of Yumol's father. The lawyer of the Furigays also defended his clients and said that it is "unfair to judge them that they are involved in this."

Meanwhile, on August 6, a man with the surname Yumol was also gunned down in the same city. The police later corrected a spot report, clarifying that the victim is not related to the perpetrator, not before several media outlets erroneously reported otherwise.
