= 2026 Tacloban school shooting =

Mass shooting in Tacloban, Philippines

- Location within the Philippines Location within Visayas
- Location: 11.2003°N 125.0209°E; San Jose National High School, San Jose, Tacloban, Philippines
- Date: June 22, 2026; 4 months ago c. 9:13 – 10:15 a.m. (UTC+08:00)
- Attack type: School shooting; mass shooting; mass murder; pedicide
- Weapons: 9mm Glock 17 Gen 4 semi-automatic pistol; .38-caliber Armscor M200 revolver
- Deaths: 3
- Injuries: 20 (15 by gunfire)
- Perpetrators: 2 teenagers
- Defender: Chris Lorenz Fabian
- Motive: Revenge for bullying and nihilistic violent extremism (both suspected)
- Accused: "Rod" (Note: Full name has not been released by the police.)
- Charges: Rod: Three counts of murder, three counts of frustrated murder, and multiple counts of serious physical injuries Nash: None; age of criminal responsibility not met

On June 22, 2026, a school shooting occurred at San Jose National High School in Tacloban, Philippines. Three students were killed and twenty others were injured, fifteen of whom by direct gunfire. Two suspects, aged 14 and 15, were arrested in connection with the shooting; one was apprehended at the scene, while the other was captured following a manhunt. The incident was widely described as an "extremely rare" case of a school shooting in the Philippines, and the first such incident in the country since the Ateneo de Manila University shooting in 2022. The Tacloban has renewed debate around the prosecution of juvenile offenders and internet safety of children in the Philippines.

A Senate investigation led by senator Risa Hontiveros linked the shooting to the international online sextortion network 764, known for its radicalization of children through nihilistic violent extremism (NVE). The Federal Bureau of Investigation considers 764 as a significant national security threat, while cybersecurity experts view the Tacloban shooting as 764's first "completed attack". The Philippine National Police has since revealed that a total of 24 Filipino minors have been rescued from 764's influence.

Three months after the shooting, the Safeguarding Against Grooming, Inducement and Predation, and Building Accountability for Technology-Facilitated Abuse or Exploitation (SAGIP BATA) Act, principally authored and sponsored by Hontiveros, was passed in the Senate of the Philippines. Aside from protection against all forms of sexual violence, abuse, and exploitation, the measure also establishes mechanisms against NVE in response to recent school shootings. The House of Representatives version of the bill is still pending.

== Background ==
While gun violence is common in the Philippines, school shootings are extremely rare, with the shooting being the first in Tacloban's history. In 2022, a gunman opened fire during a graduation ceremony at the Ateneo de Manila University in Quezon City, killing three people. The shooting was a targeted killing of a former mayor by a non-student. According to the Philippine National Police, there were nearly 5,000 gun violence cases nationwide in 2024.

=== Online activities ===
One of the suspects was found to have previously posted videos related to gun violence. The police is further investigating the digital footprints of the suspects, particularly their social media activities, search histories, and visits to online communities, following reports that one of them was wearing an outfit similar to one worn by one of the perpetrators of the Columbine High School massacre. One of the suspects also previously played a violence-themed sandbox-type video game named GoreBox Animosity, according to the official investigation.

Prior to the attack, the two suspects did research on the Juvenile Justice and Welfare Act and believed they would be spared from criminal liability due to their ages, according to screenshots of message exchanges between the two that were leaked online and later officially confirmed by the police.

== Shooting ==
According to a timeline provided by the police, 14-year-old student "Nash" arrived at San Jose National High School at around 7:07 a.m. PHT and participated in the school's flag-raising ceremony that was held at around 7:30 a.m., but was absent from his morning classes. He then met with 15-year-old "Rod" near the main gate of the school at 8:09 a.m. before they both went to a restroom three minutes later. Nash changed out of his school uniform, putting on a white sweatshirt with the logo of the band KMFDM, black fatigue pants, boots, and gloves, before leaving the restroom at 8:27 a.m.

The suspects opened fire at around 9:13 a.m. Video footage captured by the school's CCTV showed the students panicking upon hearing the gunshots. The incident was reported to the police minutes later, with one reporting the incident via hotline by 9:16 a.m. followed by an individual personally reporting the incident to a nearby police station a minute later. Armed a .38 caliber revolver and a 9mm Glock semi-automatic pistol, the suspects roamed the school's blue and green buildings before opening fire without saying anything. Students at the campus were initially unsure of what was happening before panicking as the shooting continued. According to the police, the suspects ran off after firing shots, unsuccessful in hitting their targets.

A video posted to social media showed students and teachers trying to hide in a classroom as gunshots were heard. One of the suspects shot outside a classroom window before entering the room, with all of the students present ducking for cover according to a teacher. Another teacher said that, while conducting a lesson, he saw a person holding a gun outside the room and ducked for cover along with his students.

At around 9:19 a.m., police and personnel from the Bureau of Fire Protection (BFP) arrived at the scene. Rod then went to the basketball court in an attempt to flee the scene, but was restrained and arrested by a BFP officer at around 9:25 a.m. His capture and subsequent arrest was filmed and circulated on social media. Meanwhile, Nash fled the scene and hid in a residence 200 meters (660 ft) away. A student said that they saw the fleeing shooter enter their house and then exit through the laundry area, no longer holding a gun. The police arrived at the residence at 10 a.m., but left after the suspect remained inside the house. A tricycle driver who lived nearby had eventually escorted the suspect to the police station by 10:15 a.m.

Investigation revealed that the suspect armed with the revolver only fired a single round, while the suspect who used the Glock had three rounds left and reloaded at least once during the shooting. Two empty magazines and 40 bullet cartridges were also recovered at the crime scene.

== Victims ==
Casualties

Killed

- Ayessa Nicole Dazo, 14, Grade 9
- Chris Lorenz Fabian, 15, Grade 10
- Joyancee Separa, 15, Grade 10

Wounded

- Gerric Bituin, 15
- Nathan Candelario, Grade 9
- Kaye Lapidario
- Joan Vinias, Grade 10
- 11 other students

Three people were killed at the scene and twenty others were injured. All of the deceased victims were students: two females and one male. The male victim was identified as Chris Lorenz Fabian, a 15-year-old in Grade 10, who tried to prevent one of the shooters from opening the door and entering a classroom. Fabian, whose family originated from Pampanga, was a member and Senior Scout of the Boy Scouts of the Philippines.

The two female victims were Joyancee Separa, a 15-year-old in Grade 10, and Ayessa Nicole Dazo, a 14-year-old in Grade 9. Separa was able to film the shooting from inside a classroom; the video showed Fabian's attempt to close and block the door before being fatally shot, with Separa being killed shortly after. Dazo, meanwhile, was filmed being carried outside of the school campus by civilians after being shot, later dying from her injuries.

Among the 15 directly injured in the shooting were Joan Vinias, Nathan Candelario, and Gerric Bituin. Vinias, a Grade 10 student, was feeling unwell and considered skipping school on the day of the shooting, but proceeded to class because of a presentation; she sustained a gunshot wound to the head. Candelario, a Grade 9 student, was hit in the intestines. Bituin, aged 15, is friends with "Nash" and noted that the suspect was acting differently during the flag raising ceremony. He saw the shooters through the window of his classroom and was shot by Nash in the back, with the bullet passing through his neck and hitting his chin, as he was about to move from his hiding position. The three identified injured were admitted to the intensive care unit and are now in stable condition.

Another student named Kaye Lapidario was shot through the hip while closing the door of her classroom, preventing the suspects from entering and saving the lives of her classmates.

== Suspects ==
The two suspects were identified as minors, and were thus referred to in the official police investigation by the aliases "Rod" and "Nash", aged 15 and 14 years old respectively. Initial reports identified both of the suspects as students of the school, but the police later clarified that only one was a student while the other was an outsider. Nash, the school student, was described as quiet and socially withdrawn by his teacher, who stated that the suspect was supposed to be in Grade 10 but was held back due to low grades.

The Glock pistol used in the incident was a service firearm reportedly issued to the aunt of one of the suspects, a police officer assigned to the Eastern Visayas Police Regional Office. The aunt later said that her nephew had broken into her house to steal the weapon, which was stored in a gun box inside a plastic locker. The revolver was registered to a security agency in Cebu City, but had been in the possession of one of the shooters' grandfathers, who used to work as a security guard. Later investigations revealed that the revolver's serial number also showed up on another firearm registered in Bohol.

The initial police report identified the motive as a "grudge" due to the alleged bullying of one of the suspects. Later, the Department of Justice (DOJ) considered the possibility of nihilistic violent extremism, stating that minors could have been exposed to certain influences online.

Police investigators determined that the suspects planned the attack as early as May 1 and were surprised to learn that the two were aware of the Juvenile Justice and Welfare Act (Republic Act No. 9344). The suspects planned the shooting accordingly, as they were convinced that they would not go to jail due to their status as minors. The DOJ issued a statement that, under RA No. 9344, a minor is not automatically exempted from accountability; for offending minors below 15 years old, they are subject to mandatory intervention programs like community-based actions overseen by local government officials and social workers, while offenders aged 15 to 18 can still be subject to criminal charges if "discernment" or capacity to understand that one's actions are wrong is established.

Police Regional Office 8 formally filed criminal complaints against "Rod" through the Office of the City Prosecutor of Tacloban on June 24. The complaint charges the 15-year-old with three counts of murder, three counts of frustrated murder, and multiple counts of serious physical injuries. Both suspects were placed under intervention by the Department of Social Welfare and Development.

On October 14, the National Police Commission announced the dismissal of the aunt of one of the suspects from the PNP for grave misconduct and conduct unbecoming of a police officer over her neglect in the firearm used in the shooting.

== Reactions and aftermath ==
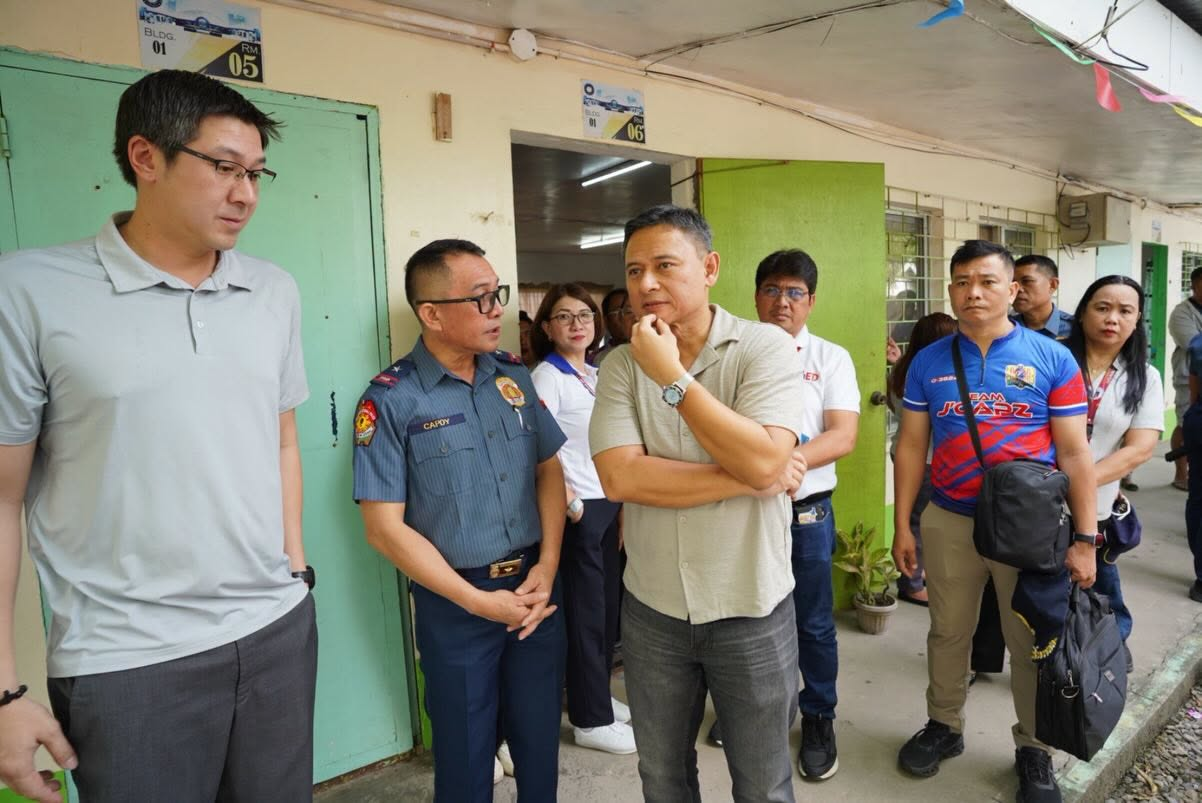
Education secretary Sonny Angara (center) inspected San Jose National High School the day after the shooting.

=== Immediate aftermath ===
DepEd classified the incident as a "high-alert situation" and condemned the shooting. President Bongbong Marcos issued a statement and called for a thorough investigation. Police urged the public to remain calm and refrain from spreading unverified information. Classes at San Jose National High School as well as two nearby schools were suspended following the shooting, which was followed by another directive that suspended classes in all public elementary and secondary schools in Tacloban. Six schools in Tacloban and Palo, Leyte, and other schools in Calbayog, Borongan, and Naval, announced strengthened coordination with local police units and tighter security measures. After the shooting and two separate knife incidents in Cavite schools, PNP chief Jose Melencio Nartatez announced coordination with DepEd to protect students and appealed to the public to refrain from spreading videos of the Tacloban incident as well as in other incidents, adding that the reckless circulation of graphic videos is a "digital nuisance and an act of cruelty that re-victimizes survivors and forces grieving families to relive their worst nightmares repeatedly".

Psychological first aid sessions were conducted by the Tacloban Schools Division for the 352 students who directly witnessed the shooting, around 1,300 other students who were on campus during the incident, and 110 school staff.

The Boy Scouts of the Philippines expressed its condolences to the victims while also recognizing Chris Lorenz Fabian for his "heroism" for defending his classmates. He was given the Gold Gallantry and Heroism Award, the highest recognition award by the scouting organization. The Pampanga Provincial Board also declared Fabian as the "Pride of Pampanga" for similar reasons. Aleth Fabian, the grandmother of Chris Lorenz, expressed her anger when talking to ABS-CBN News: "[The perpetrators are] children. Because they're minors, it's the parents who own the gun. They should be held accountable. Why was your gun in the hands of a child? Look at what happened to our children. You will answer for this! That gun should have been used against criminals; instead, it was used against innocent children! You should be held accountable!"

=== School security in the Philippines ===
Following the Tacloban shooting, authorities have monitored and responded to threats emerged in other schools in other parts of the Philippines. At least 12 other incidents involving bomb threats, a riot, stabbing, and recovery of firearms and ammunition has been recorded from June 23 to July 6, 2026.

The Department of Education subsequently conducted a nationwide school safety and security audit covering 48,000 public schools, revealing that only 36 percent or 17,000 schools have closed-circuit television (CCTV) cameras and security guards.

=== Debate on juvenile prosecution ===
Leyte 1st district representative Martin Romualdez urged law enforcement to commence a probe on the shooting. Senator Robin Padilla reiterated his push to amend Republic Act No. 9344, or the Juvenile Justice and Welfare Act, to lower the minimum age of criminal responsibility. In 2025, he had filed Senate Bill No. 372, which proposes that children ages 10 to 17 could face criminal charges for heinous crimes, including murder, rape, parricide, and drug-related crimes. Senator Kiko Pangilinan, the principal author of Republic Act No. 9344, emphasized that the suspects should not be exempted from civil liability under the law, while Senators JV Ejercito and Bong Go told the public to be careful on information regarding the incident. Senate president Sherwin Gatchalian said the shooting was "unacceptable".

=== Online safety and video gaming ===
The Tacloban shooting has been flagged as potentially being part of a trend of nihilistic violent extremism (NVE), where individuals influence minors to commit violence through online communication channels, particularly online games like Roblox and social media platforms like Facebook Messenger, Discord, and Telegram.

Senator Risa Hontiveros announced that the Senate Committee on Women, Children, Family Relations, and Gender Equality conducted hearings on July 1, 2026, as a follow-up on the April 14 inquiry, which discussed the usage of online and gaming platforms to allegedly radicalize minors to commit violence. Relatives of some of the victims and the aunt of one of the suspects attended the hearings on July 1.

==== GoreBox ban ====
The Cybercrime Investigation and Coordinating Center (CICC) ordered a temporary block of the indie sandbox game GoreBox on June 23 after one of the suspects was discovered to be an avid player of the game. On June 30, the CICC announced that Google Play and Steam had complied with their request to make the game inaccessible to people based in the Philippines. CICC stated that the ban will remain in place until the developer adds sufficient safeguards.

CICC noted that the 18+ game "allows players to experiment with various weapons and is known for its graphic depictions of violence" and cite the game's advertisement as "a physics-driven sandbox game where creativity meets unrestrained destruction". CICC Undersecretary Renato Paraiso said that "beyond this temporary ban, we are reinforcing our monitoring efforts to identify online spaces that may pose risks to young users and to ensure that appropriate interventions are made immediately."

F2 Games founder Felix Filip expressed condolences and pledged to cooperate with authorities while emphasizing that his game is designed for adults "solely for fictional entertainment". Filip declined an invitation to take part in the scheduled Senate hearings led by Hontiveros. Hontiveros denies calling for a permanent ban of GoreBox in light of the developments prior to the July 1 Senate inquiries, characterizing the insinuations on her stance on video games as "fake news".

On August 26, the Department of Information and Communications Technology (DICT) issued a statement that the GoreBox ban came into effect after a mutual agreement with the developers and was not a unilateral action by the government.

== Investigation ==
An investigation into the shooting led by senators Risa Hontiveros, Win Gatchalian and Raffy Tulfo brought up possible connections between the attack and 764, a decentralized international sextortion network founded in 2021, described by some media outlets as a Satanic and neo-Nazi cult. The group has been designated as a significant national security threat by the Federal Bureau of Investigation (FBI) and a terrorist organization by Canada, and has an established presence in the Philippines. Contrary to false reports claiming that Hontiveros had ordered a total ban on online games such as GoreBox, a temporary ban on Gorebox was suggested by Interior Secretary Jonvic Remulla and mandated by the Cybercrime Investigation and Coordinating Center (CICC). However, Hontiveros did state her intentions to investigate GoreBox in order to establish possible links of the shooting to nihilistic violent extremism (NVE).

In the July 1 Senate hearing, Hontiveros identified an "adult groomer" who used the alias "Sedykh Ryazanov" to influence the perpetrators. Following the attack, the account left a comment claiming to have produced a video featuring one of the suspects, whom he urged to delete his social media accounts. CICC Undersecretary Renato Paraiso claimed that recovered chat logs indicated the suspects' active participance in the 764 network, though these chat logs have not yet been released.

An OSINT analyst who spoke at the Senate hearing noted that comments on a social media account linked to one of the suspects were from users associated with a group on the instant messaging platform Discord, with the perpetrators having supposedly been "brainwash[ed]" by users associated with 764. The original Discord group was taken down, but reconvened four days after the Tacloban shooting, growing to 75 members by the end of July. Members of the group reportedly discussed how 764-linked users had infiltrated the group by posing as minors or are themselves under the age of 18 and speculated that the suspect belonged to those networks, as he was not a member of their previous server. Users in the Discord group also appeared to discuss various topics related to the True Crime Community (TCC), extremism, and school attacks such as the Columbine High School massacre in the United States and the Jakarta school bombing in Indonesia.

The Philippine National Police Anti-Cybercrime Group (PNP-ACG) stated that 24 Filipino minors had been rescued from the influence of the TCC, which has been linked to previous incidents of violence and networks such as 764 and No Lives Matter, since October 2025. Colonel Richmond Tadina, the deputy director of the PNP-ACG, described how extremist groups would target lonely children by befriending them through online games, eventually migrating to other platforms once they've earned the victim's trust, where subsequent messages are privately exchanged through end-to-end encryption. The victim could then be influenced to commit criminal acts as a form of initiation, with the groomers often requiring a video of said crime that would then be used to blackmail the victim into committing an escalating series of crimes.

Aside from improving the juvenile justice system in the Philippines, the Senate investigation also favored the filing of cases against the shooters' adult relatives who owned the guns that were used in the attack. The committee also added that it would include further mechanisms for child protections against NVEs in a bill that was debated at the Senate Committee on Women, Children, Family Relations, and Gender Equality.

== Legacy ==
A number of measures were officially adopted in the aftermath of the shooting. The Department of Education introduced active shooter drill to public schools around the country, in addition to the existing mandatory regular earthquake and fire drills, to provide awareness and response methods on how to address the threat of active shooter in schools. The first ever drill was conducted at the Manila Science High School on July 15, 2026, in conjunction with the first National Safe Schools Summit attended by various national government agencies, local government units, civil society organizations, and private institutions. The drill adopts a protocol closely pattered after the "run, hide, fight" protocol followed in the United States, although the education department proposes tailoring the protocol to the community and campus setting of a school.

As a response to nihilistic violent extremism (NVE), the Department of Justice recommends the use of counterterrorism mechanisms and intelligence gathering, similar to the tactic used by other countries to address NVE, while the justice department and the Congress craft a "whole-of-government" law against it.

In September 2026, the Senate of the Philippines unanimously passed Senate Bill no. 1819, also known as the Safeguarding Against Grooming, Inducement and Predation and Building Accountability for Technology-Facilitated Abuse or Exploitation (SAGIP BATA) Act, and Senate Bill No. 2426, the Comprehensive School Safety Act, in response to the Tacloban shooting and two subsequent school shootings at the Ateneo de Zamboanga University in Zamboanga City and Banga National High School in South Cotabato. The SAGIP BATA Act, authored by senator Risa Hontiveros, is meant to replace the Anti-Online Sexual Abuse or Exploitation of Children (OSAEC) and Anti-Child Sexual Abuse or Exploitation Materials (CSAEM) Act (Republic Act No. 11930) and includes additional measures and a stronger preventive framework against the grooming and exploitation of children, both online and in-person, while the Comprehensive School Safety Act mandates campus security measures, penalizations for prohibited acts such as school violence, and parent and community involvement.
