= Notre Dame of Banga =

Roman Catholic school in South Cotabato, Philippines

- Paaralan ng Notre Dame ng Banga (Filipino)

- Notre Dame of Banga entrance gate

Location
- Banga, South Cotabato; Philippines
- Coordinates: 6°25′08″N 124°46′36″E

Information
- Type: Private, Catholic, Coeducational Basic education institution
- Motto: Latin: Patria, Virtus, Scientia; English: Fatherland, Virtue, Science
- Established: 1952; 74 years ago
- Principal: Sr. Liezl Palabrica, AR
- Affiliation: Roman Catholic (Augustinian Recollect)
- Website: http://ndbanga.webs.com

Notre Dame of Banga is a Catholic school located in Banga, South Cotabato, Philippines. It was started in by the Oblates of Mary Immaculate in 1952., and was transferred to the Augustinian Recollect sisters on May 11, 1956 through the request of Bishop Gerard Mongeau. Its present school head is Sr. Ma. Crisanta A. Armendez, AR. The school covers the elementary, junior high school, and senior high school years.
