= 2026 South Cotabato school shooting =

Mass shooting in the Philippines

- Police outside a classroom in Banga National High School
- Location: 6°24′55″N 124°46′41″E; Banga, South Cotabato, Philippines
- Date: September 18, 2026 c. 12:35:56 p.m. (PHT)
- Attack type: School shooting, murder–suicide
- Weapon: Taurus 9mm semi-automatic pistol
- Deaths: 3 (including the perpetrator)
- Injuries: 6–8
- Perpetrator: Lucky Jeanrich Lope
- Defender: "Roy" (Note: Full name has been intentionally withheld by official agencies and the majority only refers to him as "Roy.")
- Motive: Under investigation; authorities note Satanism and glorifcation of mass murder online.

On September 18, 2026, at approximately 1:15 p.m. (PHT), a school shooting occurred at Banga National High School in Banga, South Cotabato, Philippines. Three people were killed, including the perpetrator, and at least six people were injured.

The incident was the third school shooting in the Philippines in 2026, after the Tacloban school shooting and the Ateneo de Zamboanga shooting.

== Background ==
School shootings are rare in the Philippines. The country has relatively strict gun ownership regulations, which includes background checks and psychological evaluation requirements, but illegal firearms still remain in circulation. In June 2026, two students opened fire at a public high school in Tacloban, killing three people and injuring 20 others before being arrested. In August 2026, a student fired at a junior high school campus in Ateneo de Zamboanga University in Zamboanga City. Two people were killed, including the gunman, and 23 others were injured. Following the two school shootings, nationwide live shooter drills in schools were carried out in September. Banga National High School is situated in Barangay Benitez of Banga, considered a part of the town's city center. South Cotabato Governor Reynaldo Tamayo Jr. said that the school had security guards funded by the local government unit.

== Shooting and response ==
Banga Mayor Albert Palencia said that the suspect warned his two friends to leave the campus, adding that he would do something after lunch. As the suspect was a "known joker", his friends laughed instead, Palencia added. Shortly after 13:00 PHT (05:00 UTC) on September 18, the school shooting occurred. The suspect shot ten students before shooting himself. Palencia, after receiving a report about the incident, arrived at the school 15 minutes later. The suspected gunman was brought to the South Cotabato Provincial Hospital. Other victims were transported to the Surallah Hospital. The shooter and two 14-year-old girls were declared dead upon arrival at the provincial hospital, according to a report by the Municipal Disaster Risk Reduction and Management Office. Emergency response workers received a call about a shooting in the high school at approximately 13:30 PHT (05:30 UTC). Thirty minutes later, four paramedics in an ambulance were dispatched to the site of the incident. Approximately one hour later, videos circulated online of a victim being carried to the sidecar of a stopped motorbike. Another video showed a teacher stating in the local dialect that there were two shooters, who were not from the school, inside the campus.

Roy, a 14-year-old Grade 9 student, confronted and kicked the gunman out from reaching his classroom during the shooting. In the process, he was wounded and shot in the hand, but continued to act despite it. He locked the classroom door to protect his classmates, and broke a rear window for them to escape. Roy survived with his injuries and was recognized by South Cotabato Governor Reynaldo Tamayo Jr. as having "courage under fire" and a "real-life hero."

== Victims ==
Three students were killed (including the perpetrator) and between 6-8 others were injured, with 4 being in critical condition.

== Perpetrator ==
The suspect was identified as Lucky Jeanrich Lope, a Grade 9 student of the high school. South Cotabato Governor Reynaldo Tamayo Jr. said that Lope was a member of the True Crime Community and used a pistol (either a 9mm or .45-caliber) that was owned by his father, an employee of the Department of Education (DepEd) regional office of Soccsksargen who was in General Santos during the shooting. Lope allegedly destroyed the vault where the firearm was stored. The shooter was also allegedly influenced by Nazism and Satanism.

According to Jonvic Remulla, the Secretary of the Interior and Local Government, Lope was an honor student who was aspiring to be a doctor. Police found that Lope had turned to Satanism and glorification of mass murder on the dark web.

== Reactions and aftermath ==
Shortly after the shooting, the Department of Social Welfare and Development announced six fatalities, which was later proven false and reverted to three in their 17:00 PHT (09:00 UTC) report. South Cotabato Governor Reynaldo Tamayo Jr. told the public to remain calm. He also expressed disbelief at the incident, stating, "We never thought that this would happen," and said that the True Crime Community would be investigated. Law enforcement scoured the area and the scene of the crime and is conducting an investigation to determine what led to the incident. DepEd was concerned over the shooting and expressed coordination with the schools division office, regional office, and local officials and law enforcement agencies for the incident details to be verified and to provide the affected assistance. DepEd also warned not to spread unverified information and was prepared to provide assistance to all people affected. Classes were suspended in all schools across Banga and in the neighboring municipality of Surallah until September 21 due to the incident.
