= 2026 Datu Usman Mampen Elementary School shooting =

School shooting in the Philippines

Datu Usman Mampen Elementary School shooting
- Location: Datu Usman Mampen Elementary School, Cotabato City, Bangsamoro, Philippines
- Date: September 13, 2026; 11:41 p.m. (PST)
- Target: Group of men
- Attack type: School shooting, mass shooting, shootout, political violence
- Weapons: .45 ACP pistol, 9 mm caliber pistol
- Deaths: 3
- Injuries: 15
- Perpetrator: Unidentified males
- Motive: Dispute over the 2026 Bangsamoro Parliament election

On September 13, 2026, two groups of men opened fire in a crowded area outside the Datu Usman Mampen Elementary School in Cotabato City, Philippines, which served as a polling station for the 2026 Bangsamoro Parliament election, ahead of voting. Three people were killed and at least 15 others were injured. The perpetrators fled the scene and are at large.

== Background ==
The shooting occurred amid the first ever 2026 Bangsamoro Parliament election. Prior to the explosion, two explosions rocked Cotabato City in the night, killing a person. A strafing incident also occurred in one of the villages where a bomb went off. A separate shooting at another elementary school in Cotabato City left one person dead and three others injured, including a police officer who was shot in the foot. The gunmen fled the scene.

== Shooting ==
Just before midnight at around 11:41 p.m. (PHT), an incident led to a heated argument and fist fight between two groups of men outside the Datu Usman Mampen Elementary School, which was a polling center. The altercation escalated into a shootout between the people, resulting in over a dozen people being struck by gunfire. The shooters fled the scene and remain unidentified.

== Victims ==
The deceased victims were identified as 88-year-old Idar Kasan Andog, 43-year-old Caril Abdul Lumidsog and 48-year-old Bain Abdul Lumidsog. At least 15 people were transported to nearby hospitals for medical treatment following the shooting.

== Aftermath ==
Security was tightened across Bangsamoro after the shootings and bombings near polling stations.

== Investigation ==
Police recovered empty shells from the scene believed to belong to an .45 ACP pistol and a 9 mm caliber pistol. Police said that the men were members of rival political factions clashed while competing to be first in line to vote.
