= GoreBox =

- Developer: F2Games
- Publisher: F2Games
- Engine: Unity 6
- Platforms: Android; Linux; Windows
- Release: WW: 22 July 2023
- Genre: Game creation system
- Modes: Single-player, Multiplayer (later-mode until March 2026)

GoreBox is a 2023 German indie sandbox game developed and published by F2Games. GoreBox allows for elements with more graphic violence, with the developers openly promoting gore mechanics, weapon systems and destruction-focused gameplay. The game had a multiplayer game mode which was later removed in March 2026, due to dealing with exploiters, bot raids, and fixing cybersecurity vulnerabilities.

GoreBox was released on Microsoft Windows, Linux and Android. The game was released on Steam on 22 July 2023. GoreBox has been associated with real life incidents, including the 2025 Odintsovo school attack and the 2026 Tacloban school shooting. As of June 2026, the game has more than 10 million downloads.

== Gameplay ==
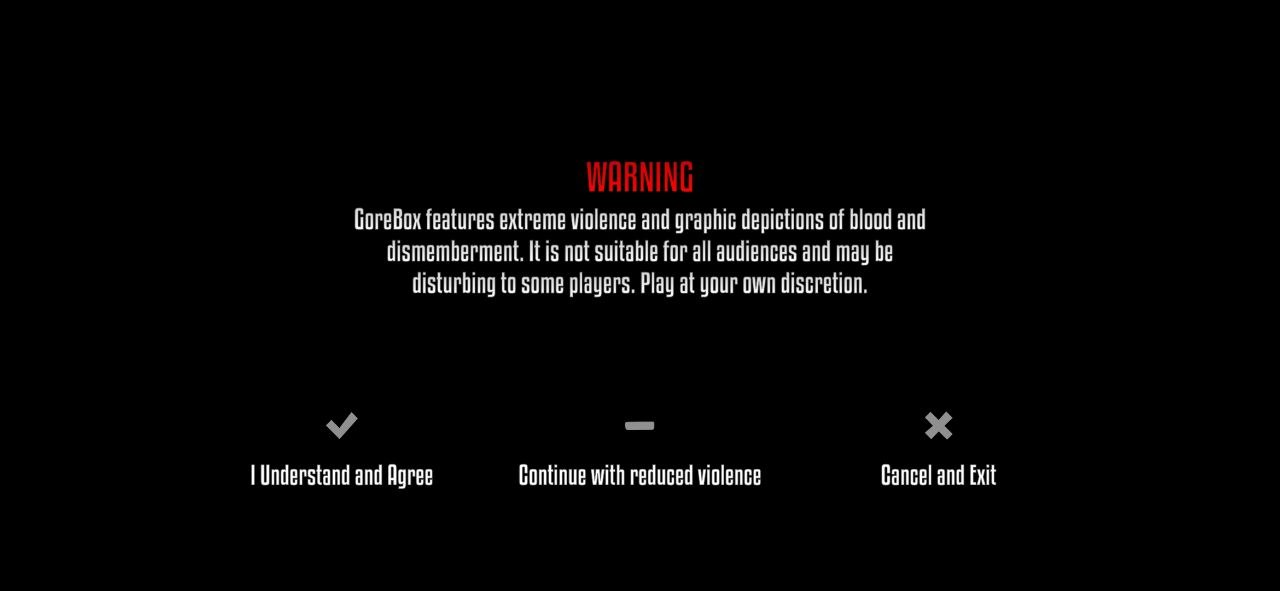
Violence warning in the mobile version of Gorebox, with the choice to play the game with reduced violence.

GoreBox is a sandbox game that has been compared to Roblox. In GoreBox, players can manage virtual worlds, create custom scenarios, and interact with other users in user-generated environments. Players can also build maps, role-play, modify characters, and participate in multiplayer experiences. Players can control blocky humanoid avatars in the game. The game had a multiplayer game mode which was later removed in March 2026. The developers cited challenges in dealing with exploiters, bot raids, and fixing cybersecurity vulnerabilities.

Unlike Roblox, GoreBox allows for elements with more graphic violence with the developers openly promoting gore mechanics, weapon systems and destruction-focused gameplay. The Android version of the game allows to the option to toggle down violence to a degree. It has been given an 18+ rating according to the International Age Rating Coalition.

== Development and release ==
GoreBox is an independent video game created by Felix Filip of German game developing studio F2Games. GoreBox was made available for play in desktop via Microsoft Windows and Linux and in mobile phones via Android. The game was released on Steam on 22 July 2023. While the game on Steam needs to be purchased, the Android version of the game is free-to-play, is ad-supported, and with in-app purchases available. As of June 2026, GoreBox has over 10 million downloads.

== Controversy ==
GoreBox has been associated with real life incidents. The suspect of the 2025 Odintsovo school attack, Timofey Kulyamov was an active member of the GoreBox community, apparently playing and discussing maps designed as recreations of various mass shootings, including the 2019 Bærum mosque attack and has expressed his far-right views.

In Singapore, a 14-year old boy reportedly got self-radicalized online by Islamic State (IS) extremist ideology and was issued a restriction order under the Internal Security Act in November 2025. He recreated IS attacks in GoreBox and Roblox in support of the group. The boy's right to travel was restricted after he expressed desires to go abroad and fight for the Islamic State.

In Tacloban, Leyte, in the Philippines, two teenage boys, 14 and 15 years of age respectively committed a shooting at the San Jose National High School. The 14-year old was discovered to be an avid gamer of GoreBox leading to the temporary ban of the game in the country by the Cybercrime Investigation and Coordinating Center (CICC). Game developer Felix Filip has expressed condolences to the victims and vowed for coordination with authorities but has declined an invite to an inquiry in the Philippine Senate. On August 26, the Department of Information and Communications Technology (DICT) issued a statement that the ban came after a mutual agreement with the developers and not a unilateral action by the government.

== See also ==
- List of video games banned by country
