= Banga National High School =

Public high school in South Cotabato, Philippines

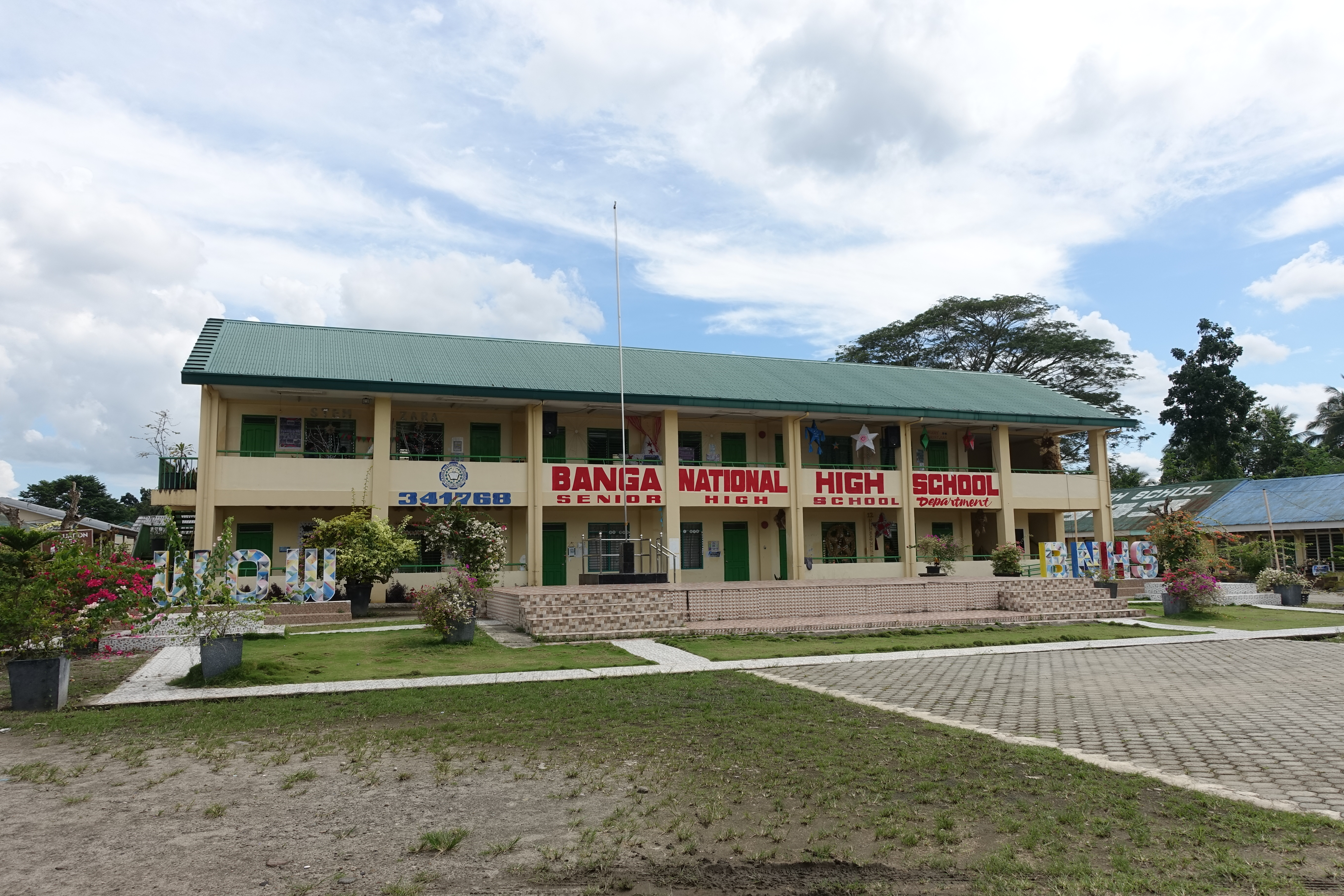
- Banga National High School in 2022.

Location
- Jose Parreño Street; Banga, South Cotabato; 6°24′56″N 124°46′40″E

Information
- School type: Public
- Established: 1991

Banga National High School is a public secondary school, the first public school established in the municipality of Banga.

The school is located in 'Brgy. Benitez, Banga, South Cotabato, Philippines. The school covers the junior high school and senior high school years.

== History ==
Banga National High School was created through Republic Act 6991, known as the Creation of Banga National High School. The creation of the school was realized through the efforts of the constituents of Banga, Mayor Mary Lou M. Solomon and with the assistance of late former congressman, Hilario Le De Pedro III. The institution was established in January, 1991.

On the year 1993, the school applied for a National Recognition and it was under Region XI Davao City. The disbursement of funds was supervised at first by Sunas and Mrs. Lenie Javellana trained the bookkeeper and the disbursing officer. Then, on 1994 the salary of teachers was under the Division Office but were again supervised by Miss Linda Isidro, at KNCHS.

The institution goes on through trials and difficulties, until concrete facilities were granted through governor Hilario De Pedro, the municipal officials and Congresswoman Daisy Avance Fuentes. From then on more classrooms were sponsored by government agencies here and abroad. Several administrators took part on the endeavor for the development of the school.

In school year 2013–2014, the school organized some intervention programs such as information drive and counseling services, as part of the Guidance Office Program and feeding program for the malnourished students. Other programs include Gulayan sa Paaralan, Youth Entrepreneurship and Cooperativitism in Schools (YECS-BNHS), Solid Waste Management, MTAP, Reading Program, The School Greening Program (NDEP) Convention on the Rights of the Child and RACRAS. There is also the Boy Scouting [which is very active]

Banga National High School aims to uphold quality education. The school continues to develop the talents and skills of the students in academic and in sports. In modern times it hopes to achieve modern instruction through computers and networking.

A school shooting occurred on September 18, 2026, with three confirmed casualties including the gunman and multiple injured

== Administrators ==
- 1991–1995 – Nobertly M. Alvero
- 1995–1997 – Dr. Lucinda M. Dela Cruz
- 1997–2001 – Ricardo P. Dela Cruz
- 2001–2003 – Dr. Lucinda M. Dela Cruz
- 2003–2011 – Isidro P. Planto
- 2011–Present – Dr. Lucinda M. Dela Cruz
