= School shooting =

Armed attack at an educational institution

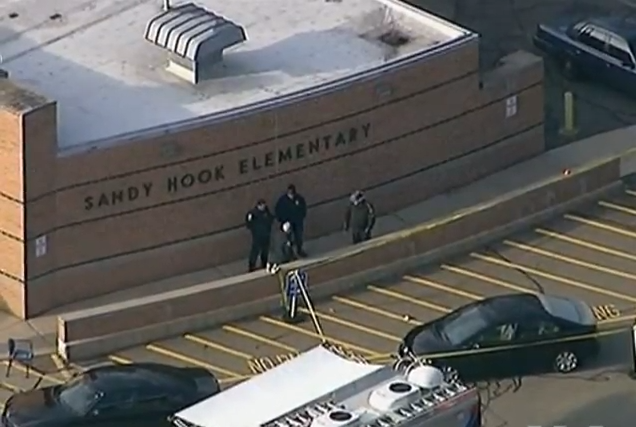
Police at the scene of the Sandy Hook Elementary School shooting where Adam Lanza killed 26 people before killing himself in 2012

A school shooting is an armed attack at an educational institution, involving the use of a gun. Many school shootings are also categorized as mass shootings due to multiple casualties. The United States has had the highest number of such shootings, over 50 times as many as all other G7 nations combined between 2009 and 2018. School shootings have sparked political debate over gun violence, gun rights, gun control, and zero tolerance policies, especially in the United States.

According to studies, factors behind school shooting include easy access to firearms, family dysfunction, lack of family supervision, and mental illness among many other psychological issues. The top motive of attackers was being bullied, persecuted, or threatened (75%), followed by revenge (61%), while 54% reported having multiple reasons. The remaining motives included an attempt to solve a problem (34%), suicide or depression (27%), and seeking attention or recognition (24%).

== Profiling ==
The United States Secret Service published the results from a study regarding 37 school shooting incidents, involving 41 individuals in the United States from December 1974 through May 2000. In a previous report of 18 school shootings by the Federal Bureau of Investigation (FBI), they released a profile that described shooters as middle-class, lonely/alienated, awkward, Caucasian males who had access to guns.

The most recent report cautioned against the assumption that a perpetrator can be identified by a certain 'type' or profile. The results from the study indicated that perpetrators came from differing backgrounds, making a singular profile difficult when identifying a possible assailant. For example, some perpetrators were children of divorce, lived in foster homes, or came from intact nuclear families. The majority of individuals had rarely or never gotten into trouble at school and had a healthy social life. Some, such as Alan Lipman, have warned about the lack of empirical validity of profiling methods.

=== Age ===
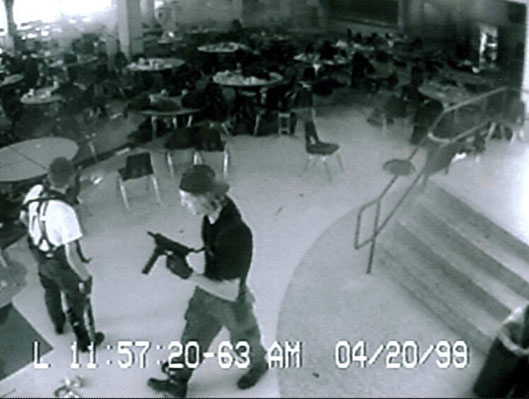
18-year-old Eric Harris (left) and 17-year-old Dylan Klebold (right) were shooters responsible for the Columbine High School massacre

According to Raine (2002), immaturity is one of many identified factors increasing the likelihood of an individual committing criminal acts of violence and outbursts of aggression. This fact is supported by findings on brain development occurring as individuals age from birth.

According to the Australian-based Raising children network and Centre for Adolescent Health (and other sources): the main change occurring in the developing brain during adolescence is the (so-called) pruning of unused connections in thinking and processing. While this is occurring within the brain, retained connections are strengthened. Synaptic pruning occurs because the nervous system in humans develops by firstly, the over-producing of parts of the nervous system, axons, neurons, and synapses, to then later in the development of the nervous system, make the superfluous parts redundant, i.e. pruning (or apoptosis, otherwise known as cell death). These changes occur in certain parts of the brain firstly; the pre-frontal cortex, the brain location where decision-making occurs, is the concluding area for development.

While the pre-frontal cortex is developing, children and teenagers might possibly rely more on a part of the brain known as the amygdala; involving thinking that is more emotionally active, including aggression and impulsiveness. As a result, individuals can be more inclined to make riskier decisions more often.

- Steinberg (2004) identified the fact of adolescents taking more risks, typically, than adults;
- Deakin et al. (2004), and Overman et al. (2004) indicate a decline in risk taking from adolescence to adulthood;
- Steinberg (2005), Figner et al. (2009), and Burnett et al. (2010) identified adolescent age individuals as more likely to take risks than young children and adults.

=== Parental supervision ===
"Studies have found that within offenders' families, there is frequently a lack of supervision, low emotional closeness, and intimacy". In a 2018 publication, Dr. George S. Everly Jr, of The Johns Hopkins School of Medicine and The Johns Hopkins Bloomberg School of Public Health outlined an accumulation of seven, recurring themes that warrant consideration regarding school shooters. One factor is that school shooters tended to isolate themselves, and "exhibited an obsessive quality that often led to detailed planning, but ironically they seemed to lack an understanding of the consequences of their behavior and thus may have a history of adverse encounters with law enforcement." A criticism in the media of past shooters was questioning how so much planning could commence without alerting the parents or guardians to their efforts. However, this has proven to be as difficult of a question to answer as anticipating any of the past school shootings.

Data from the National Center for the Analysis of Violent Crime and Centers for Disease Control and Prevention, covering decades of US school shootings, reveals that 68% of shooters obtained weapons from their home or the home of a relative. Since 1999, out of 145 US school shootings committed by children/adolescents, 80% of the guns used were taken from their homes or relative's home. The availability of firearms has direct effect on the probability of initiating a school shooting. This has led many to question whether parents should be held criminally negligent for their children's gun-related crimes. By 2018, a total of four parents were convicted of failing to lock up the guns that were used to shoot up US schools by their children. Such incidents may also lead to nationwide discussion on gun laws.

The FBI offers a guide for helping to identify potential school shooters, The School Shooter: A Threat Assessment Perspective.

Daniel Schechter, Clinical Psychiatrist, wrote that for a baby to develop into a troubled adolescent who then turns lethally violent, a convergence of multiple interacting factors must occur, that is "every bit as complicated...as it is for a tornado to form on a beautiful spring day in Kansas". Thus, reinforcing the issue that school shooters do not necessarily come from "bad" parents, no more than they could come from attentive, educated, negligent, single, married, abusive, or loving parents.

=== School bullying ===
Dorothy Espelage of the University of Florida observed that 8% of bullying victims become "angry, and aggressively so." She added, "They become very angry, they may act out aggressively online. They may not hit back, but they definitely ruminate."

"Bullying is common in schools and seemed to play a role in the lives of many of the school shooters". A typical bullying interaction consists of three parts, the offender/bully, a victim, and one or more bystanders. This formula of three enables the bully to easily create public humiliation for their victim. Students who are bullied tend to develop behavioral problems, depression, less self-control and poorer social skills, and to do worse in school. Once humiliated, victims never want to be a victim again and try to regain their image by joining groups. Often, they are rejected by their peers and follow through by restoring justice in what they see as an unjust situation. Their plan for restoration many times results in violence as shown by the school shooters. 75% of school shooters had been bullied or left behind evidence of having been victims of bullying. Other academics however are critical of a bullying-school shootings connection.

The Uvalde shooter who killed 21 people was frequently bullied in 4th grade at Robb Elementary school.

=== Mental illness ===
Although the vast majority of mentally ill individuals are non-violent, some evidence has suggested that mental illness or mental health symptoms are nearly universal among school shooters. A 2002 report by the US Secret Service and US Department of Education found evidence that a majority of school shooters displayed evidence of mental health symptoms, often undiagnosed or untreated. Criminologists Fox and DeLateur note that mental illness is only part of the issue, however, and mass shooters tend to externalize their problems, blaming others and are unlikely to seek psychiatric help, even if available.

According to an article written on gun violence and mental illness, the existence of violence as an outlet for the mentally ill is quite prominent in some instances (Swanson et al., 2015). The article lists from a study that 12% of people with serious mental illness had committed minor or serious violence within the last year, compared to 2% of people without illness committing those same acts.

Other scholars have concluded that mass murderers display a common constellation of chronic mental health symptoms, chronic anger or antisocial traits, and a tendency to blame others for problems. However, they note that attempting to "profile" school shooters with such a constellation of traits will likely result in many false positives as many individuals with such a profile do not engage in violent behaviors.

McGinty and colleagues conducted a study to find out if people tended to associate the violence of school shootings with mental illness, at the expense of other factors such as the availability of magazines generally with a capacity of more than 10 rounds.

The authors expressed concern that proposals to target gun control laws at people with mental illness do not take into account the complex nature of the relationship between serious mental illness and violence, much of which is due to additional factors such as substance abuse. However, the link is unclear since research has shown that violence in mentally ill people occurs more in interpersonal environments.

In a presented study from researchers Baird, Roellke & Zeifman from the Social Science Journal, school size and level of attention given to students can precede violent actions, as students who commit mass shootings in larger schools are more likely to have transitioned from smaller schools.

A 2016 opinion piece published by U.S. News & World Report concluded that 22% of mass murders are committed by people who suffer from a serious mental illness, and 78% do not. This study also concluded that many people with mental illnesses do not engage in violence against others and that most violent behavior is due to factors other than mental illness.

=== Injustice collectors ===
In a 2015 New Republic essay, Columbine author Dave Cullen describes a subset of school shooters (and other mass murderers) known as "injustice collectors", or people who "never forget, never forgive, [and] never let go" before they strike out. The essay describes and expands on the work of retired FBI profiler Mary Ellen O'Toole, who has published a peer-reviewed journal article on the subject. It also quotes Gary Noesner, who helped create and lead the FBI's hostage negotiation unit, and served as Chief Negotiator for ten years.

=== Violent media theory ===
==== Video games ====
It has long been debated whether there exists a correlation between school shooting perpetrators and the type of media they consume. A popular profile for school shooters is someone who has been exposed to or enjoys playing violent video games. However, this profile is considered by many researchers to be misguided or erroneous. Ferguson (2009) has argued that a third variable of gender explains the illusory correlation between video game use and the type of people who conduct school shootings. Ferguson explains that the majority of school shooters are young males, who are considerably more aggressive than the rest of the population. A majority of gamers are also young males. Thus, it appears likely that the view that school shooters are often people who play violent video games is more simply explained by the third variable of gender.

The idea of profiling school shooters by the video games they play comes from the belief that playing violent video games increases a person's aggression level, which in turn, can cause people to perpetrate extreme acts of violence, such as a school shooting. There is little to no data supporting this hypothesis but it has become a vivid profile used by the media since the Columbine Massacre in 1999.

A summation of past research on video game violence finds that video games have little to no effect on aggression. (Anderson, 2004; Ferguson, 2007 & Spencer, 2009) Again, this supports the idea that although it is a popular opinion to link school shooters to being violent video gamers; this misconception is often attributable to third variables and has not been supported by research on the connection between aggression and gaming.

==== Literature ====
The 1977 novel Rage by Stephen King (written under the pseudonym Richard Bachman), was linked to five school shootings and hostage situations that took place between 1988 and 1997; the most recent of these, the 1997 Heath High School shooting, was ultimately influential in King's decision to pull the book out of print permanently.

=== Notoriety ===
Shooting massacres in English-speaking countries often occur close together in time. In the summer of 1966, two major stories broke: Richard Speck murdered eight women on a single night in Chicago, and Charles Whitman shot and killed 15 people from a clock tower at the University of Texas in Austin. Neither of them sought fame, but with the new television news climate, they received it anyway. Seeing this, 18-year-old Robert Benjamin Smith bought a gun, and on November 12, 1966, he killed four women and a toddler inside the Rose-Mar College of Beauty in Mesa, Arizona. "I wanted to get known, just wanted to get myself a name," explained Smith. He had hoped to kill nearly ten times as many people, but had arrived at the beauty college campus too early. Upon his arrest, he was without remorse, saying simply, "I wanted people to know who I was." Towers, et al. (2015), found a small, but significant temporary increase in the probability of a second school shooting within 2 weeks after a known school shooting, which was only slightly smaller than the probability of repeats after mass killings involving firearms.

However, much more work is needed with greater scope on investigations, to understand whether this is a real phenomenon or not. Some attribute this to copycat behavior, which can be correlated with the level of media exposure. In these copycat shootings, oftentimes the perpetrators see a past school shooter as an idol, so they want to carry out an even more destructive, murderous shooting in hopes of gaining recognition or respect. Some mass murderers study media reports of previous killers.

Recent premeditative writings were presented according to court documents and showed Joshua O'Connor wrote that he wanted the "death count to be as high as possible so that the shooting would be infamous". O'Connor was arrested before he was able to carry out his plan. Infamy and notoriety, "a desire to be remembered" has been reported as the leading reason for planned shootings by most perpetrators who were taken alive either pre or post shooting.

== By region ==
=== United States ===
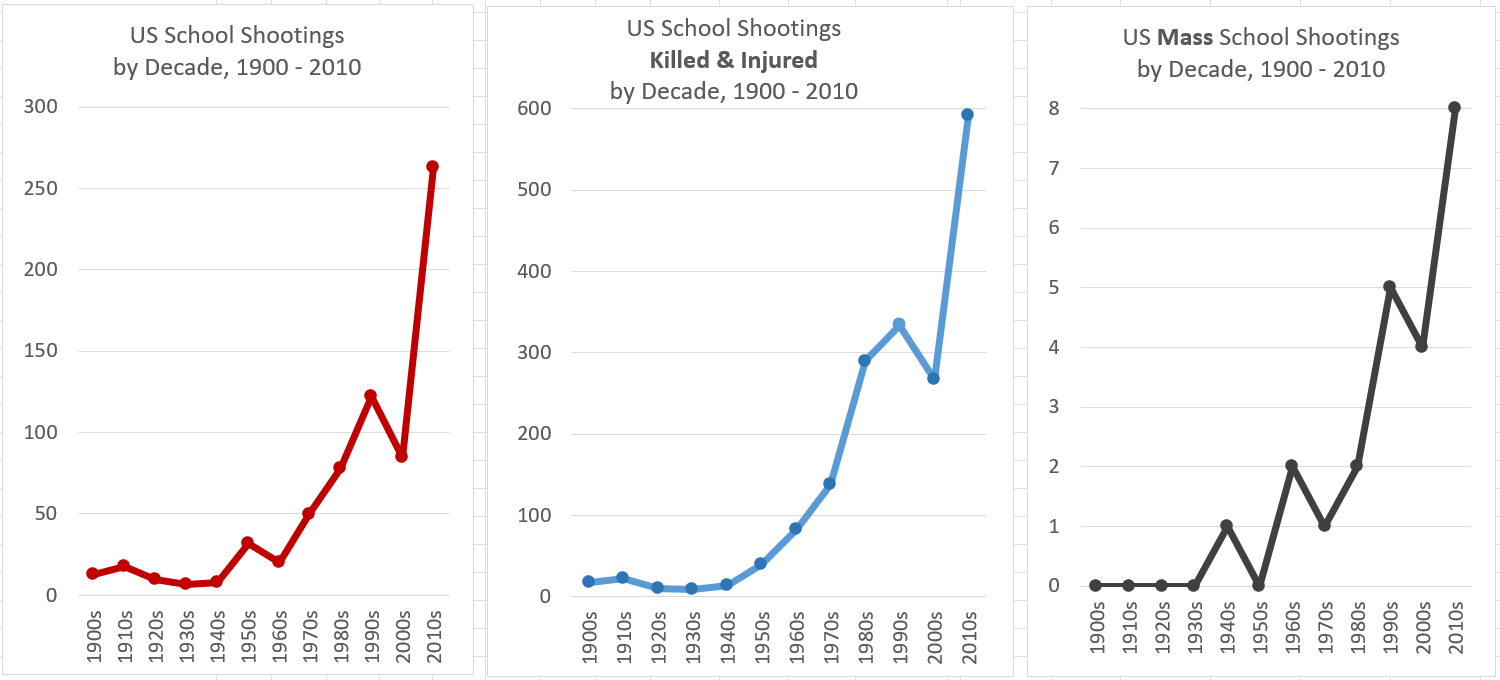
School shootings in the US, 1900–2010

School shootings are an "overwhelmingly American" phenomenon due to the availability of firearms in the United States. Children at U.S. schools have active shooter drills. According to USA Today, in 2019 "about 95% of public schools now have students and teachers practice huddling in silence, hiding from an imaginary gunman."

Between the 1999 Columbine High School massacre in Colorado and the 2012 Sandy Hook Elementary School shooting in Connecticut, there were 31 school shootings in the United States and 14 in the rest of the world combined. Between 2000 and 2010, counting incidents from 37 countries in which someone was injured or killed on school grounds, with two or more victims, and not counting "single homicides, off-campus homicides, killings caused by government actions, militaries, terrorists or militants", the number of such incidents in the United States was one less than in the other 36 countries combined; in the vast majority of the United States incidents, perpetrators used guns.

Tracking school shootings in the United States was made more difficult by the passage by United States Congress of the Dickey Amendment in 1996, which mandated that no Centers for Disease Control and Prevention funds "may be used to advocate or promote gun control", although this does not mean the CDC has stopped researching gun violence. Instead, Congress relies on independent research done by non-partisan organizations for getting data on gun violence in the United States.

Between the Columbine massacre and the Santa Fe High School shooting in Texas, shooting of some form happened at 216 schools, and at least 141 children, educators and other people were killed and another 284 were injured. 38% of the students who experienced school shootings were African American although African American students were 16.6% of the school population. Schools in at least 36 states and the District of Columbia have experienced a shooting.

Many school shootings in the United States result in one non-fatal injury. The type of firearm most commonly used in school shootings in the United States is the handgun. Three school shootings (the Columbine massacre, the Sandy Hook massacre, and the 2018 Parkland High School shooting in Florida), accounted for 43% of the fatalities; the type of firearm used in the most lethal school shootings was the rifle.

70% of the perpetrators of school shootings were under the age of 18, with the median age of 16. More than 85% of the perpetrators of school shootings obtained their firearms from their own homes or from friends or relatives. Targeted school shootings, those occurring for example in the context of a feud, were about three times as common as those that appeared indiscriminate. Most perpetrators of school shootings exhibited no signs of debilitating mental disorder, such as schizophrenia, although most mass killers typically have or exhibit signs of depression. On the other hand, Eric Harris was almost certainly a psychopath as noted by the FBI. Between the Columbine massacre and 2015, "more than 40 people" were "charged with Columbine-style plots;" almost all were white male teenagers and almost all had studied the Columbine attack or cited the Columbine perpetrators Eric Harris and Dylan Klebold as inspiration.

At least 68 schools that experienced a school shooting employed a police officer or security guard; in all but a few, the shooting ended before any intercession. Security guards or resource officers were present during four of the five school shooting incidents with the highest number of dead or injured: Columbine, the 2001 Santana High School shooting in California, the 2018 Marshall County High School shooting in Kentucky, and Stoneman Douglas.

There were 11 firearm-related events that occurred at a school or campus in the first 23 days of 2018. As of May 2018, more people, including students and teachers, were killed in 2018 in schools in the United States than were killed in military service for the United States, including both combat and non-combat military service, according to an analysis by The Washington Post. In terms of the year-to-date number of individual deadly school shootings incidents in the United States, early 2018 was much higher than 2017, with 16 in 2018 and four in 2017, through May; the year-to-day through May number of incidents was the highest since 1999. As of May 2018, thirteen school shootings took place on K–12 school property in 2018 that resulted in firearm-related injuries or deaths, including 32 killed and 65 injured, according to Education Week. 22 school shootings where someone was hurt or killed occurred in the United States in the first 20 weeks of 2018, according to CNN.

==== List of school shootings in the United States ====
As of March 27, 2023, the ten deadliest school shootings in the United States since the 1999 Columbine High School massacre are:

- 2007 Virginia Tech shooting in Blacksburg, Virginia (33 dead)
- 2012 Sandy Hook Elementary School shooting in Newtown, Connecticut (27 dead)
- 2022 Robb Elementary School shooting in Uvalde, Texas (22 dead)
- 2018 Marjory Stoneman Douglas High School shooting in Parkland, Florida (17 dead)
- 2018 Santa Fe High School shooting in Santa Fe, Texas (10 dead)
- 2015 Umpqua Community College shooting near Roseburg, Oregon (10 dead)
- 2005 Red Lake shootings in Red Lake, Minnesota (10 dead)
- 2023 Nashville school shooting in Nashville, Tennessee (7 dead)
- 2012 Oikos University shooting in Oakland, California (7 dead)
- 2006 West Nickel Mines School shooting in Nickel Mines, Pennsylvania (7 dead)

Other school shootings occurring in the United States include: the 1966 University of Texas tower shooting in Austin, Texas, in which 16 were killed, the 2024 Apalachee High School shooting in Winder, Georgia, in which four were killed, the 2001 Santana High School shooting in Santee, California, in which two were killed, the 2018 Marshall County High School shooting in Benton, Kentucky, in which two were killed, and the 2021 Oxford High School shooting in Oxford Township, Michigan, in which four were killed.

==== Studies of United States school shootings ====
During 1996, the CDC (Centers for Disease Control and Prevention) together with the US Department of Education and the United States Department of Justice, published a review of deaths related to schools occurring as a result of violence, including explicitly "unintentional firearm-related death", for the academic years 1992–1993 and 1993–1994. A second study (Anderson; Kaufman; Simon 2001), a continuation from the 1996 study, was published December 5, and covered the period 1994–1999.

A United States Secret Service study concluded that schools were placing false hope in physical security, when they should be paying more attention to the pre-attack behaviors of students. Zero-tolerance policies and metal detectors "are unlikely to be helpful," the Secret Service researchers found. The researchers focused on questions concerning the reliance on SWAT teams when most attacks are over before police arrive, profiling of students who show warning signs in the absence of a definitive profile, expulsion of students for minor infractions when expulsion is the spark that push some to return to school with a gun, buying software not based on school shooting studies to evaluate threats although killers rarely make direct threats, and reliance on metal detectors and police officers in schools when shooters often make no effort to conceal their weapons.

In May 2002, the Secret Service published a report that examined 37 US school shootings. They found:

- Incidents of targeted violence at school were rarely sudden, impulsive acts.
- Prior to most incidents, other people knew about the attacker's idea or plan to attack.
- Most attackers did not threaten their targets directly prior to advancing the attack.
- There is no accurate or useful profile of students who engaged in targeted school violence.
- Most attackers engaged in some behavior prior to the incident that caused others concern or indicated a need for help.
- Most attackers had difficulty coping with significant losses or personal failures. Moreover, many had considered or attempted suicide.
- Many attackers felt bullied, persecuted, or injured by others prior to the attack.
- Most attackers had access to and had used weapons prior to the attack.
- In many cases, other students were involved in some capacity.
- Despite prompt law enforcement responses, most shooting incidents were stopped by means other than law enforcement intervention.

==== Film ====
There have been many representations of American school shootings in films and TV shows produced by both United States and international production companies. While films Bowling For Columbine, Elephant, Run Hide Fight, We Need to Talk about Kevin, Beautiful Boy, Mass, and Zero Day are solely focused on the either the act or the aftermath, many of the shows such as Criminal Minds, Degrassi: the Next Generation, Law and Order, One Tree Hill, Static Shock, and Trigger investigate the crime for an episode or use it as a plot point for about half a season.

==== Music ====
One of the more provocative songs to come out of the Parkland, Florida high school shooting was "thoughts & prayers" from alternative artist/rapper grandson (born Jordan Benjamin). The song is a critique of politicians sending out their "thoughts and prayers" to the victims of the Parkland high school shooting and other mass shootings, accompanied by what he perceives as a consistent resistance to gun control laws.

"I Don't Like Mondays" by Irish new wave band The Boomtown Rats was directly inspired by the 1979 Cleveland Elementary School shooting.

"Pumped Up Kicks" by American indie group Foster the People explores gun violence and homicidal thoughts among youth. Additionally, the band's bassist, Cubbie Fink, has a cousin who survived the Columbine High School massacre, which inspired the band to create a platform to discuss these issues.

==== Political impact ====
School shootings and other mass killings have had a major political impact. Governments have discussed gun-control laws, to increase time for background checks. Also, bulletproof school supplies have been created, including backpacks, desks, bullet-resistant door panels, and classroom whiteboards (or bulletin boards) which reinforce walls or slide across doors to deflect bullets. The National Rifle Association of America has proposed allowing teachers to carry weapons on school grounds as a means of protecting themselves and others as a possible solution. In 2018, 14 states had at least one school district in which teachers were armed, with another 16 states permitting districts to arm teachers subject to local policy. Most states also require the gun carriers to receive advance permission from the districts' superintendents or trustees. "In New York State, written permission from the school is required in order to carry a firearm on school grounds."

Due to the political impact, this has spurred some to press for more stringent gun control laws. In the United States, the National Rifle Association is opposed to such laws, and some groups have called for fewer gun control laws, citing cases of armed students ending shootings and halting further loss of life, and claiming that the prohibitions against carrying a gun in schools do not deter the gunmen. One such example is the Mercaz HaRav Massacre, where the attacker was stopped by a student, Yitzhak Dadon, who shot him with his personal firearm which he lawfully carried concealed. At a Virginia law school, there is a disputed claim that three students retrieved pistols from their cars and stopped the attacker without firing a shot. Also, at a Mississippi high school, the vice principal retrieved a firearm from his vehicle and then eventually stopped the attacker as he was driving away from the school. In other cases, such as shootings at Columbine and Red Lake High Schools, the presence of an armed police officer did little to nothing to prevent the killings.

The Gun-Free Schools Act was passed in 1994 in response to gun related violence in schools, so many school systems started adopting the Zero-Tolerance Law. The Gun-Free Schools Act required students who bring firearms or bombs to school to be expelled for a year. By 1997, the Zero-Tolerance for any type of weapon was implemented by more than 90 percent of U.S. public schools.

Donald Trump has repeatedly supported the idea of arming school teachers, particularly those with military backgrounds, arguing that armed educators could respond quickly to attacks and prevent mass casualties. He first proposed this idea after the 2018 Stoneman Douglas High School shooting in Florida and reiterated it following the 2022 Robb Elementary School shooting in Uvalde, Texas. The proposal has faced widespread opposition from parents of victims, educators, and gun control advocates.

=== Brazil ===
In Brazil, school shootings and similar attacks, usually involving melee weapons or improvised explosives, have been on the rise since 2022. Multiple potential explanations exist, including the glorification of American mass murderers leading to a copycat "globalization" of such incidents, with the perpetrators often seeking to replicate American attacks. For example, Wellington Menezes de Oliveira, the perpetrator of the Rio de Janeiro school shooting, cited Seung-Hui Cho, the perpetrator of the Virginia Tech shooting, as a "brother" and thanked him for his "bravery" and "leading the way"; The perpetrators of the Suzano school shooting were heavily inspired by the Columbine High School massacre. Other theories include the spread of conspiracy theories, hate speech and extremist propaganda.

=== Philippines ===
As of October 2026, the Philippines witnessed three school shootings: the 2026 Tacloban school shooting, the 2026 Ateneo de Zamboanga University shooting, and the 2026 South Cotabato school shooting, all of which left fatalities. The Tacloban school incident prompted the authorities to temporarily ban the sandbox-style action game GoreBox. Additionally, the government proposed online age verification measures to prevent children from accessing social media and online gaming platforms that have social networking features. Senator Sherwin Gatchalian asserted the seriousness of youth addition on social media and violent games and claimed of "studies" that "showed these have influences on their mental health".

=== Russia ===
School shootings have been on the rise in Russia since the events of the COVID-19 pandemic, possibly attributed to increasing social isolation, school bullying, and a strong military culture, similar to the United States' "gun culture". Online groups also praise individuals who commit such attacks, leading to a copycat crime effect. In February 2022, with immediate effect, the Supreme Court of Russia declared such groups as a terrorist movement to combat constant copycat attacks.

=== Turkey ===
While mass school shootings are known to happen in the USA, occurrences of this tragedy have recently also heightened in Turkey. The authorities wish to keep the public calm and have the narrative under control.

== Police response and countermeasures ==
Analysis of the Columbine school shooting and other incidents where first responders waited for backup has resulted in changed recommendations regarding what bystanders and first responders should do. An analysis of 84 mass shooting cases in the US from 2000 to 2010 found that the average response time by police was 3 minutes. In most instances that exceeds the time the shooter is engaged in killing. While immediate action may be extremely dangerous, it may save lives which would be lost if people involved in the situation remain passive, or a police response is delayed until overwhelming force can be deployed. It is recommended by the US Department of Homeland Security that civilians involved in the incident take active steps to evacuate, hide, or counter the shooter and that individual law enforcement officers present or first arriving at the scene attempt immediately to engage the shooter.

== School countermeasures ==
=== Armed classrooms ===
There has been considerable policy discussion about how to help prevent school and other types of mass shootings. One suggestion that has come up is the idea to allow firearms in the classroom. "Since the issue of arming teachers is a relatively new topic, it has received little empirical study. Therefore, most of the literature does not come from peer-reviewed sources but rather published news reports. In addition, most of these reports are not objective and clearly appear to support a specific side of the debate." So far, data has been inconclusive as to whether or not arming teachers would have any sort of benefit for schools. For years, some areas in the US have allowed "armed classrooms" to deter (or truncate) future attacks by changing helpless victims into armed defenders. Advocates of arming teachers claim that it will reduce fatalities in school shootings, but many others disagree.

Many teachers have had their concerns with the idea of armed classrooms. "One teacher stated that although she is pro-gun, she does not feel as though she could maintain gun safety on school grounds (Reuters, 2012). Teachers expressed the fear that bigger students could overpower them, take the weapon, and then use it against the teacher or other students." Some members of the armed forces have also had concerns with armed classrooms. Police forces in Texas brought up the potential for teachers to leave a gun where a student could retrieve and use it. "They are further concerned that if every teacher had a gun, there would be an unnecessarily large number of guns in schools (even including elementary schools). This large number of guns could lead to accidental shootings, especially those involving younger children who do not understand what guns do."

To diminish school shootings there are many preventive measures that can be taken such as:

- Installing wireless panic alarms to alert law enforcement.
- Limiting points of entry with security guarding them.
- Strategically placing telephones for emergencies so police are always reachable at any point in the campus.
- Employing school psychologists to monitor and provide mental health services for those that need help.
- Coordinating a response plan between local police and schools in the event of a threat.

In a 2013 research report published by the Center for Homicide Research, they find that many also reject the idea of having armed classrooms due to what is termed the "weapons effect", which is the phenomenon in which simply being in the presence of a weapon can increase feelings of aggression. "In Berkowitz & LaPage's (1967) examination of this effect, students who were in the presence of a gun reported higher levels of aggressive feelings towards other students and gave more violent evaluations of other students' performance on a simple task in the form of electric shocks. This finding points to possible negative outcomes for students exposed to guns in the classroom (Simons & Turner, 1974; Turner & Simons, 1976)."

In 2008, Harrold Independent School District in Texas became the first public school district in the U.S. to allow teachers with state-issued firearm-carry permits to carry their arms in the classroom; special additional training and ricochet-resistant ammunition were required for participating teachers. Students at the University of Utah have been allowed to carry concealed pistols (so long as they possess the appropriate state license) since a State Supreme Court decision in 2006. In addition to Utah, Wisconsin and Mississippi each have legislation that allow students, faculty and employees with the proper permit, to carry concealed weapons on their public university's campuses. Colorado and Oregon state courts have ruled in favor of Campus Carry laws by denying their universities' proposals to ban guns on campus, ruling that the UC Board of Regents and the Oregon University System did not have the authority to ban weapons on campus. A selective ban was then re-instated, wherein Oregon state universities enacted a ban on guns in school building and sporting events or by anyone contracted with the university in question. A commentary in the conservative National Review Online argues that the armed school approach for preventing school attacks, while new in the US, has been used successfully for many years in Israel and Thailand. Teachers and school officials in Israel are allowed and encouraged to carry firearms if they have former military experience in the IDF, which almost all do. Statistics on what percentage of teachers are actually armed are unavailable and in Israel, for example, the intent is to counter politically motivated terrorist attacks on high value, soft targets, not personal defense against, or protection from, unbalanced individual students.

The National Rifle Association has explicitly called for placing armed guards in all American schools. However, Steven Strauss, a faculty member at the Harvard Kennedy School of Government, offered a preliminary calculation that placing armed guards in every American school might cost as much as $15 billion/year, and perhaps only save 10 lives per year (at a cost of $1.5 billion/life saved).

=== Gun storage and mental health treatment ===
Two main reasons given for abandoning their plans by students who planned a shooting but didn't carry it out, were that they couldn't access a gun and that someone helped them find hope during a personal crisis.

One common way for students to access guns (especially for those too young to purchase them legally) is to take a firearm otherwise legally possessed by a household member. For example, a shooting in Sparks, Nevada on October 21, 2013, left a teacher and the shooter, a twelve-year-old student, dead with two seriously injured. The handgun used in the shooting had been taken from the shooter's home. Sandy Hook Elementary School in Newtown, Red Lake High School in Red Lake, Minnesota in 2005, and Heath High School in West Paducah, Kentucky in 1997 also involved legal guns taken from the home.

Increasing the security of firearm storage is thus proposed as a preventative measure for school shootings. A 2000 study of firearm storage in the United States found that "from the homes with children and firearms, 55% reported to have one or more firearms in an unlocked place". 43% reported keeping guns without a trigger lock and in an unlocked place. A 2005 study on adult firearm storage practices in the United States found that over 1.69 million youth under age 18 are living in homes with loaded and unlocked firearms. Also, 73% of children under age 10 living in homes with guns reported knowing the location of their parents' firearms.

Most states have laws designed to prevent children from accessing firearms, varying in severity. The toughest laws enforce criminal liability when a minor achieves access to a carelessly stored firearm. The weakest forbid people from directly providing a firearm to a minor. In between the two extremes is a law that enforces criminal liability for carelessly stored firearms, but only where the minor uses the firearm and causes death or serious injury. Another intermediate law enforces liability only in the event of reckless, knowing or deliberate behavior by the adult.

In 2019, the United States Secret Service released an analysis of targeted school violence, concluding the best practice for prevention was forming a "multidisciplinary threat assessment team, in conjunction with the appropriate policies, tools, and training". An earlier report published in 2018 concluded there was no single profile of a student attacker, and emphasized the importance of the threat assessment process instead. The threat assessment process described includes gathering information about student behaviors, negative or stressful events, and what resources are available for the student to overcome those challenges.

=== Countermeasures ===
In 2015, Southwestern High School in Shelbyville, Indiana, was portrayed as possibly the "safest school in America". The school has been used as a "Safe School Flagship" of possible countermeasures to an active shooter.

- All teachers have lanyards with a panic button that alerts police.
- Classrooms have automatically locking "hardened doors", and windows have "hardened exterior glass" to deflect bullets and physical attack.
- Cameras, described as "military-grade", that feed video directly to Shelby County Sheriff's Office are mounted throughout the school.
- Smoke canisters mounted in the roof of corridors can be remotely discharged to slow a shooter's movement.

Other countermeasures include tools like doorjambs, rapidly-deployable tourniquets, and ballistic protection systems like the CoverMe-Seat.

In 2019, Fruitport High School in Michigan became the first school in the U.S. to be rebuilt with concrete barriers in hallways for students to hide from bullets. The BBC also reports the "hallways are curved to prevent a shooter from having a clear line of sight during any potential attack." Classrooms have been redesigned so students can hide more easily. Costing $48 million to rebuild, Bob Szymoniak, Fruitport High School's superintendent, believes these alterations will become part of the structure of all U.S. schools. "These are design elements that are naturally part of buildings going into the future."

The STOP School Violence Act was passed on March 14, 2018 to provide funding grants to schools to be used for implementing security measures.

== Aftermath ==
After experiencing the threat of a school shooting, as well as the changes in the school via countermeasures, students continue to experience trauma. Mass shootings can bring on the onset of PTSD and continued depression. In the cities that are home to these kind of events, the town can experience continued paranoia and a heightened sense of fear.

== See also ==
- Lists of school shootings in the United States
- List of school attacks in Turkey
- List of school massacres by death toll
- List of school-related attacks
- List of unsuccessful attacks related to schools
- Threat assessment
- Bureau of Alcohol, Tobacco, Firearms and Explosives
- Campus carry in the United States
- Counter-terrorism
- Federal Bureau of Investigation
- Gun politics in the United States
- Incendiary device
- Mass murder
- Mass shooting
- School bullying
- School violence
- Shoot (Hellblazer)
- Social rejection
- Soft target
- Suicide attack
- Suicide bombing
- Suicide by cop
- SWAT
- Terrorism

== Sources ==
- Eppes, Mary (March 8, 2018). "JSU Student Shot on campus". MSNews. Archived from the original on July 27, 2018.
- Muschert, Glen – Sumiala, Johanna (eds.): School Shootings: Mediatized Violence in a Global Age. Studies in Media and Communications, 7. Bingley: Emerald, 2012. ISSN 2050-2060 ISBN 978-1-78052-918-9
- Schildkraut, J.; Hernandez, T. (2014). "Laws that bit the bullet: A review of legislative responses to school shootings". American Journal of Criminal Justice. 39 (2): 358–374. doi:10.1007/s12103-013-9214-6. S2CID 144697331.
