= Banga, South Cotabato =

Municipality in South Cotabato, Philippines

Banga
- Municipality
- Municipality of Banga

Other transcription(s)
  - Jawi: باڠ
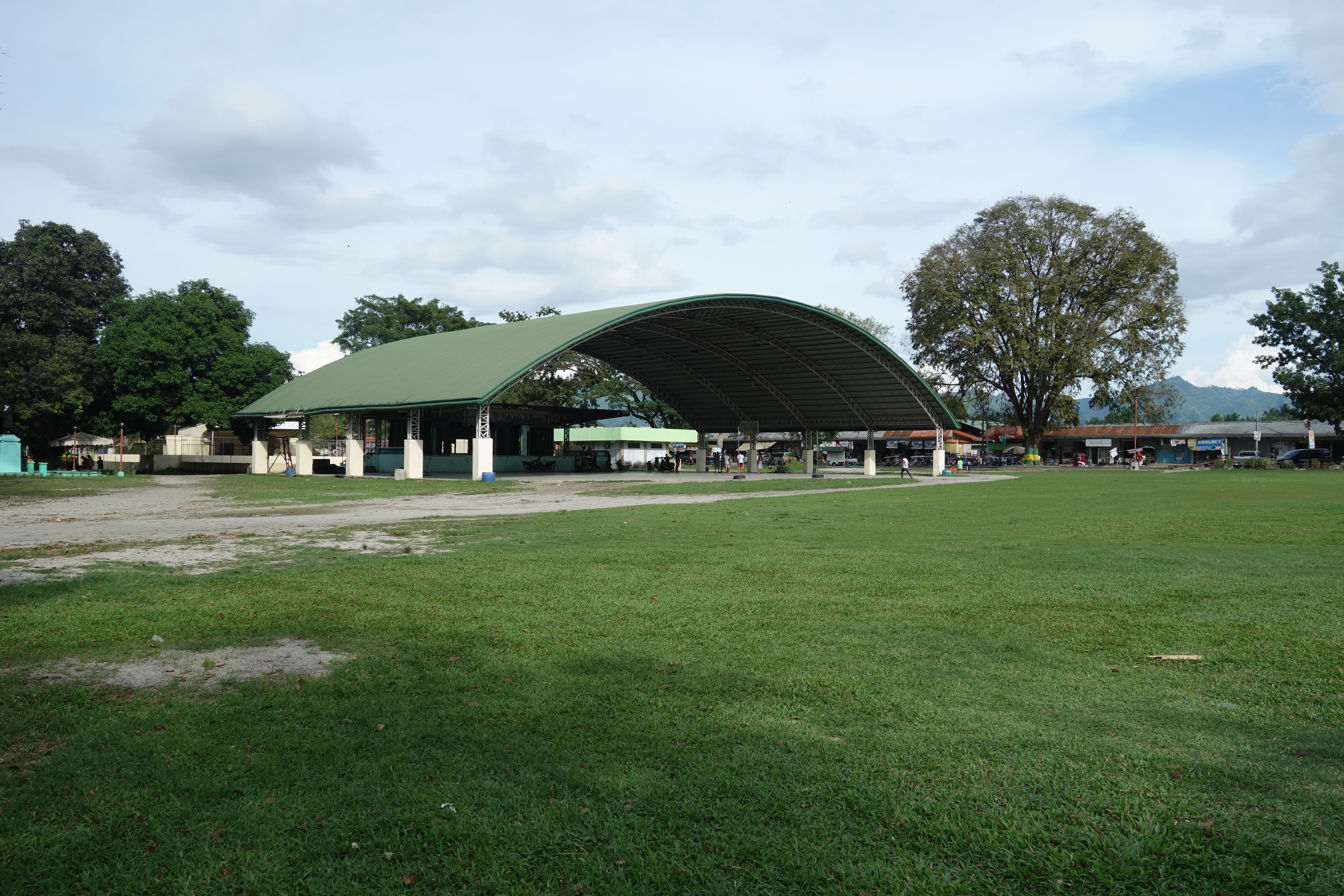
- Banga Municipal Plaza in 2018

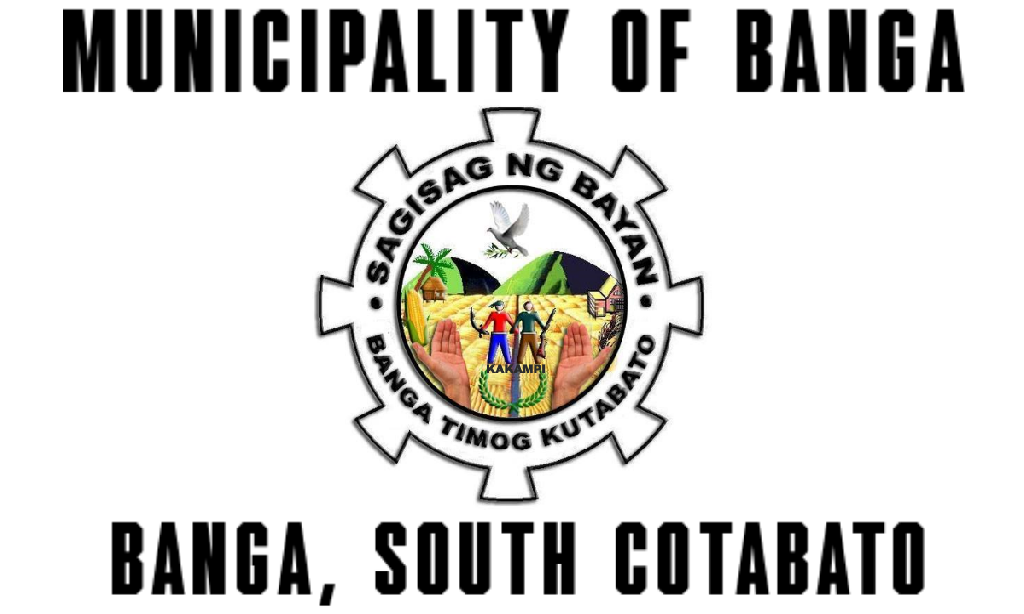
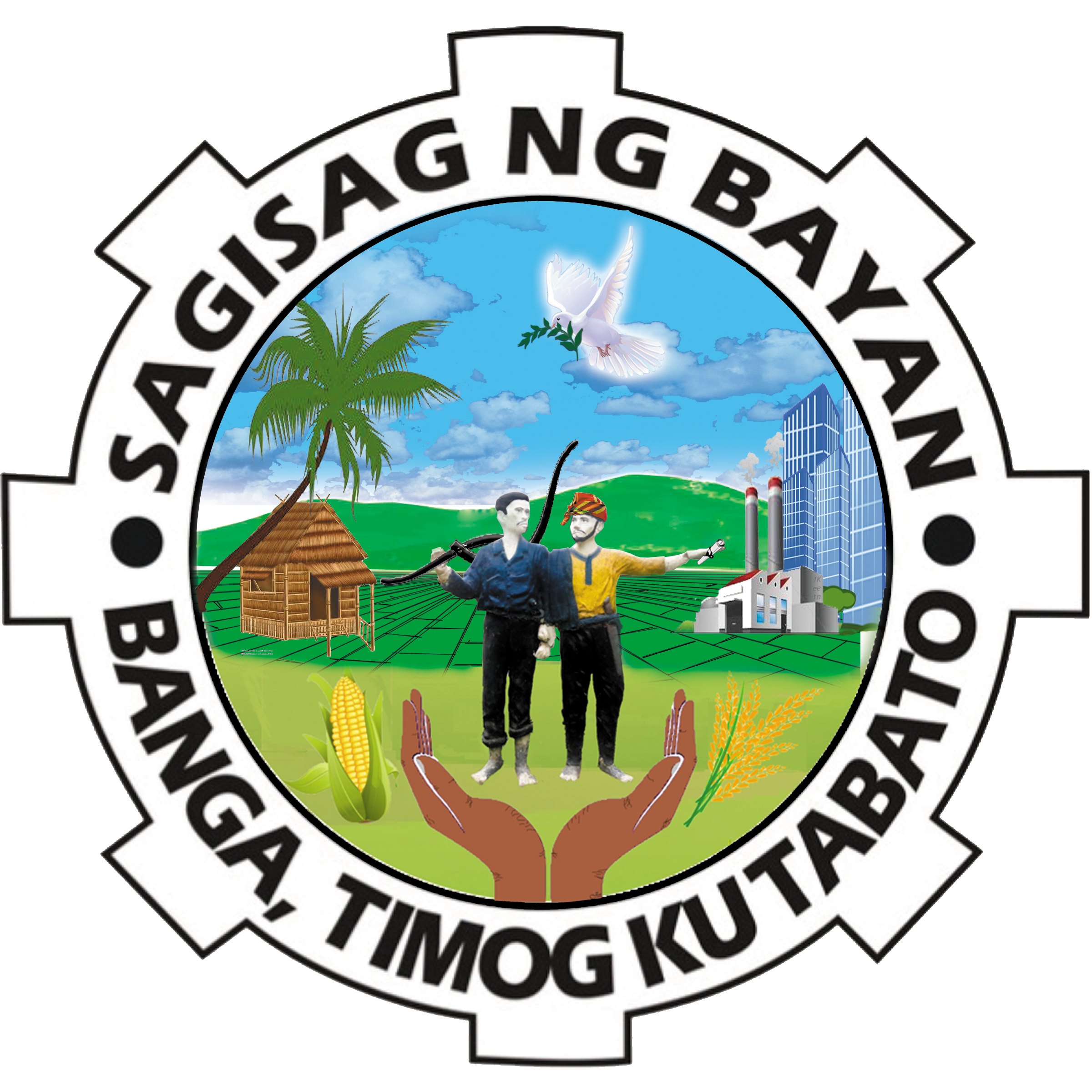
- Flag Seal

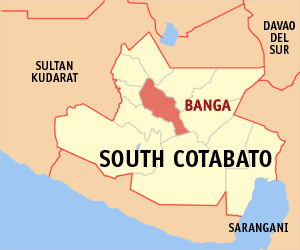
- Map of South Cotabato with Banga highlighted
- Interactive map of Banga
- Location within the Philippines
- Coordinates: 6°25′29″N 124°46′33″E
- Country: Philippines
- Region: Soccsksargen
- Province: South Cotabato
- District: 2nd district
- Founded: September 11, 1953
- Barangays: 22 (see Barangays)

Government
  - Type: Sangguniang Bayan
  - Mayor: Albert Deocades Palencia
  - Vice Mayor: Gemma I. Lloren
  - Representative: Peter B. Miguel
  - Electorate: 56,428 voters (2025)

Area
  - Total: 240.35 km^{2} (92.80 sq mi)
- Elevation: 169 m (554 ft)
- Highest elevation: 333 m (1,093 ft)
- Lowest elevation: 106 m (348 ft)

Population (2024 census)
  - Total: 91,536
  - Density: 380.84/km^{2} (986.38/sq mi)
  - Households: 23,266

Economy
  - Income class: 1st municipal income class
  - Poverty incidence: 18.54% (2023)
  - Revenue: ₱ 409.3 million (2024)
  - Assets: ₱ 1,014 million (2024)
  - Expenditure: ₱ 328.8 million (2024)
  - Liabilities: ₱ 285.8 million (2024)

Service provider
  - Electricity: South Cotabato 1 Electric Cooperative (SOCOTECO 1)
- Time zone: UTC+8 (PST)
- ZIP code: 9511
- PSGC: 1206302000
- IDD : area code: +63 (0)83
- Native languages: Hiligaynon; Cebuano; Maguindanao; Blaan; Tagalog
- Website: bangascot.gov.ph/index.php

Banga, officially the Municipality of Banga (Hiligaynon: Banwa sang Banga; Cebuano: Lungsod sa Banga; Tagalog: Bayan ng Banga; Maguindanaon: Inged nu Banga, Jawi: ايڠد نو باڠ), is a municipality in the province of South Cotabato, Philippines. According to the 2024 census, it has a population of 91,536 people.

Banga is situated in the northwest of the province of South Cotabato. The town derived its name from a palm tree known to the natives of the place as "Buanga" which during the pre-settlement time, predominantly grew in the area.

Banga is linked by a concrete national highway road from General Santos to the east and Cotabato City in the west.

== History ==
The area was initially established as a Settlement District under the Allah Valley Project of the National Land Settlement Administration (NLSA) on March 4, 1941, with Gen. Paulino Santos serving as General Manager. On September 11, 1953, through Presidential Proclamation No. 612 issued by President Elpidio Quirino, it was separated from Koronadal and established as an independent municipality.

== Geography ==
=== Barangays ===
Banga is politically subdivided into 22 barangays. Each barangay consists of puroks while some have sitios.

- Benitez (Poblacion)
- Cabudian
- Cabuling
- Cinco (Barrio 5)
- Derilon
- El Nonok
- Improgo Village (Poblacion)
- Kusan (Barrio 8)
- Lam-Apos
- Lamba
- Lambingi
- Lampari
- Liwanay (Barrio 1)
- Malaya (Barrio 9)
- Punong Grande (Barrio 2)
- Rang-ay (Barrio 4)
- Reyes (Poblacion)
- Rizal (Barrio 3)
- Rizal Poblacion
- San Jose (Barrio 7)
- San Vicente (Barrio 6)
- Yangco Poblacion

== Demographics ==
Population census of Banga
Year	Pop.	±% p.a.
1960	36,468	—
1970	36,319	−0.04%
1975	43,452	+3.66%
1980	50,460	+3.03%
1990	59,743	+1.70%
1995	66,571	+2.05%
2000	69,131	+0.81%
2007	73,355	+0.82%
2010	76,343	+1.46%
2015	83,989	+1.83%
2020	89,164	+1.27%
2024	91,536	+0.63%
Source: Philippine Statistics Authority

=== Climate ===
Climate data for Banga, South Cotabato
Month	Jan	Feb	Mar	Apr	May	Jun	Jul	Aug	Sep	Oct	Nov	Dec	Year
Mean daily maximum °C (°F)	30 (86)	30 (86)	31 (88)	31 (88)	30 (86)	29 (84)	28 (82)	29 (84)	29 (84)	29 (84)	29 (84)	30 (86)	30 (85)
Mean daily minimum °C (°F)	23 (73)	23 (73)	23 (73)	24 (75)	24 (75)	24 (75)	24 (75)	24 (75)	24 (75)	24 (75)	24 (75)	23 (73)	24 (74)
Average precipitation mm (inches)	146 (5.7)	121 (4.8)	164 (6.5)	212 (8.3)	347 (13.7)	397 (15.6)	364 (14.3)	366 (14.4)	302 (11.9)	308 (12.1)	280 (11.0)	192 (7.6)	3,199 (125.9)
Average rainy days	16.7	15.5	19.4	22.7	29.0	28.9	27.9	27.5	26.5	28.1	27.2	22.6	292
Source: Meteoblue

== Economy ==
Poverty incidence of Banga (%)

Source: Philippine Statistics Authority

== Education ==
College:

- Santo Nino College Foundation, Inc.
- Green Valley College Foundation, Inc - Banga Campus

Secondary:

- Notre Dame of Banga
- Notre Dame of Lamba
- Mindanao Community School
- Banga National High School
- South Eastern Academy
- Lampari National High School
- Lamba National High School
- Punong Grande National High School
- Kusan National High School
- San Vicente National High School
- Malaya National High School
- San Jose National High School
- Rizal (3) National High School
- El Nonok National High School

Elementary:

- Notre Dame of Banga Elementary Dept.
- Lamba Central Elementary School
- BEC Elementary School
- SDA Elementary School
- Lampari Elementary School
- Liwanay Elementary School
- Purok Rizal Pob. Elementary School
- Banga Central Elementary School
- Purok Reyes Central Elementary School
- El Nonok Elementary School
- San Vicente Elementary School
- Malaya Elementary School
- Matlong Elementary School
- Rizal 3 Elementary School
- Upong Elementary School

== Notable personalities ==
- Orlando Quevedo - Filipino prelate of the Catholic Church. A Cardinal since 2014, he was Archbishop of Cotabato from 1998 to 2018. He became a bishop in 1980.
- Delfin Lorenzana - 36th Secretary of National Defense of the Philippines.
