= Bata National High School =

Public high school in Bacolod, Philippines

- Mataas na Paaralang Pambansa ng Bata (Filipino)

Location
- Negros Island Region; Bacolod, Negros Occidental; Philippines
- Coordinates: 10°42′04″N 122°58′32″E

Information
- Other name: BNHS
- Former name: Bata High School
- Type: Public
- Motto: Believe. Act. Touch Lives. Achieve.
- Established: 1967
- Principal: Leopoldo B. Manolo
- Grades: 7 to 12
- Campus type: Urban
- Colour: Yellow
- Nickname: Batanians
- Newspaper: The Marapara View (English) & Ang Tanawing Marapara (Filipino)

Bata National High School (Filipino: Mataas na Paaralang Pambansa ng Bata) is a school in Bacolod, Philippines. It is built within the barangay itself (Brgy. Bata). The barangay serves as the boundary between the cities of Bacolod and Talisay. Its name was formed by merging the first syllables of the cities.

== History ==
Bata High School (BHS), which became Bata National High School (BNHS), was established in July 1967 with the passage of City Ordinance No. 112 s. 1967 by virtue of R.A. 6024: "An act to institute a Charter for Barrio High School" and approved on August 4, 1969. Bata High School was born.

On June 10, 1987, President Corazon Aquino signed E.O. 189, placing all secondary public school teachers under the administrative supervision and control of the Department of Education, Culture and Sports (DECS). Finally, R.A. 6655 otherwise known as the "Free Secondary Act" paved the way for the conversion of Bata High School to Bata National High School.

The school started with two first year classes with 71 students per section. There were only two full-time teachers and three part-time teachers headed by Mr. Alfonso Adlaon, the principal of Bata Elementary School, the likewise in-charge of Bata High School.

In 1973, Mr. Adlaon was promoted to District supervisor and Mrs. Violeta R. Benedicto succeeded him. In November 1978, Mrs. Benedicto was promoted as principal of Domingo Lacson High School. Mr. Jose C. Dayot, Jr. who was then the principal of Alangilan High School took over.

In 1989, after 11 years as principal of BHS, Mr. Jose C. Dayot, Jr. was promoted to Education Supervisor I and Mr. Artagnan Baticados succeeded him. After four months Mr. Baticados retired and on January 1, 1990, Ms. Virginia Hofileña took over. Two years after, Ms. Hofileña transferred to the Division of Silay and Mrs. Salvacion R. Gonzales succeeded her as the principal of BNHS.

Mrs. Gonzales was promoted to principal III and was transferred to Domingo Lacson National High School (DLNHS) in 1996. Mr. Jose G. Dayot, III took the leadership as the school head of BNHS and was promoted also to principal III to Sum-ag National High School. Mr. Ramonito Posadas took over on OIC capacity until Mr. Alex Castijon succeeded him. However, Mr. Castijon's stay in BNHS was short-lived due to his early demise. In November 2001, a new principal took over in the person of Mrs. Teresita A. Miravalles. For almost 10 years Mrs. Miravalles had led BNHS to its very challenging years. A year before she retired, she was chosen as the most outstanding secondary school principal in the Division of Bacolod City and BNHS was also chosen as the most outstanding secondary school in the Division of Bacolod City based on SBM practices. In August 2011, Mrs. Miravalles bid goodbye, Josefa M. Jopson then was installed from August 2012 and was promoted to Principal IV in November 2014 to DLNHS.

From S. Y. 2014 - 2017, BNHS was led by Evelyn B. Casiano as the Principal III installed last November 3, 2014. The Officer-in-Charge of the school is Mr. Jimmy P. Dewara, the head of Mathematics Department.
