= Isla Vista attacks =

2014 terrorist attacks in California, U.S.

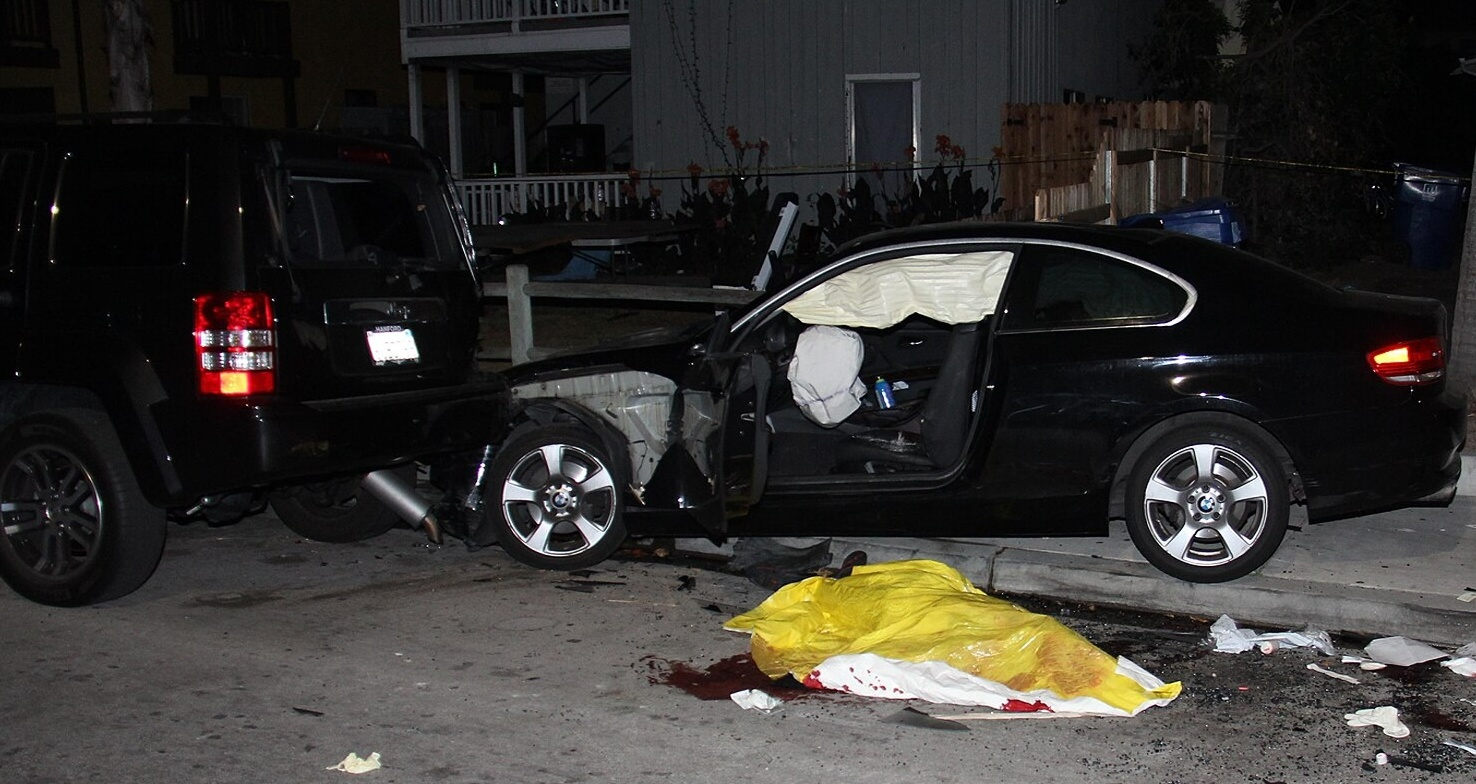
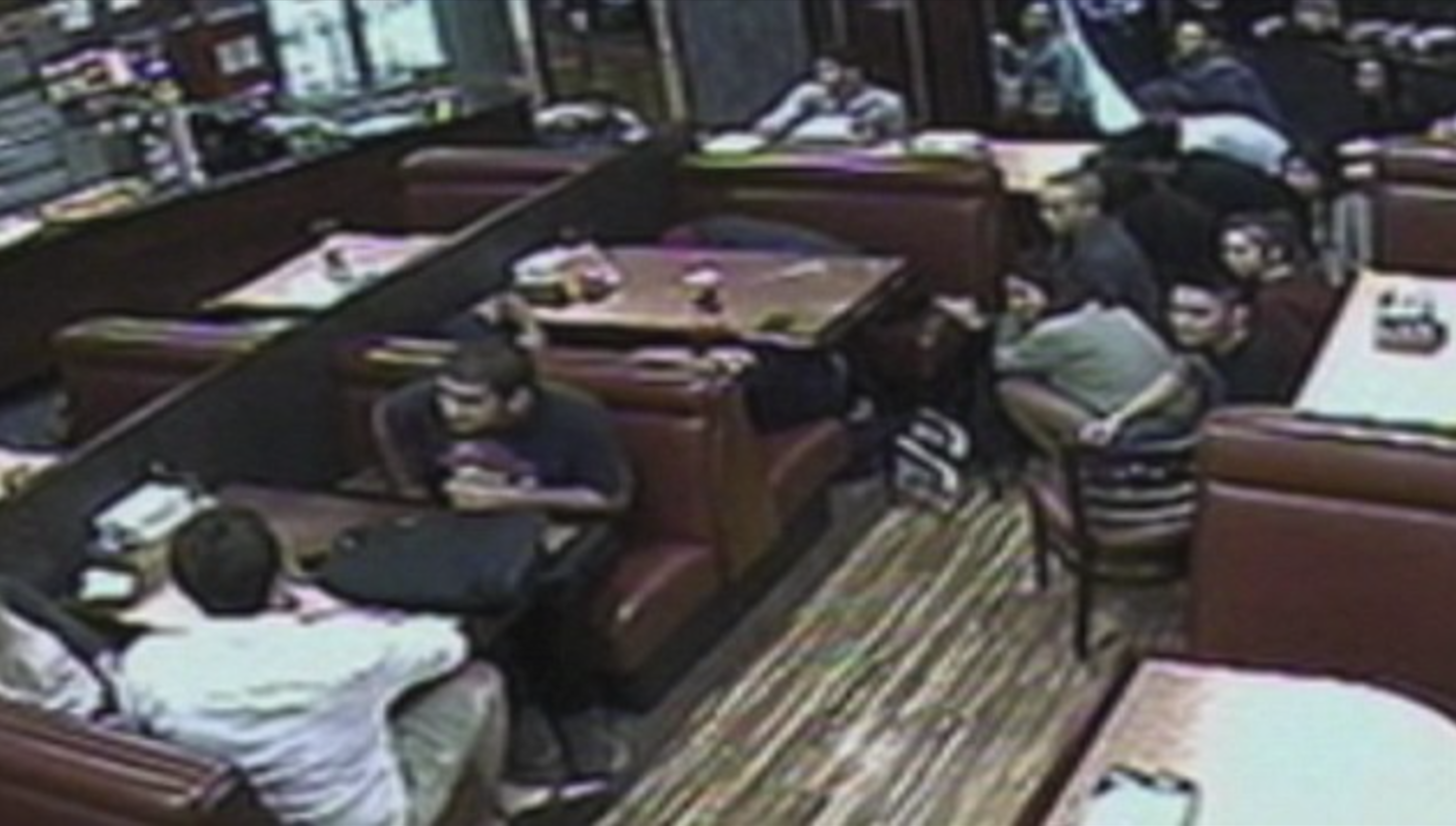
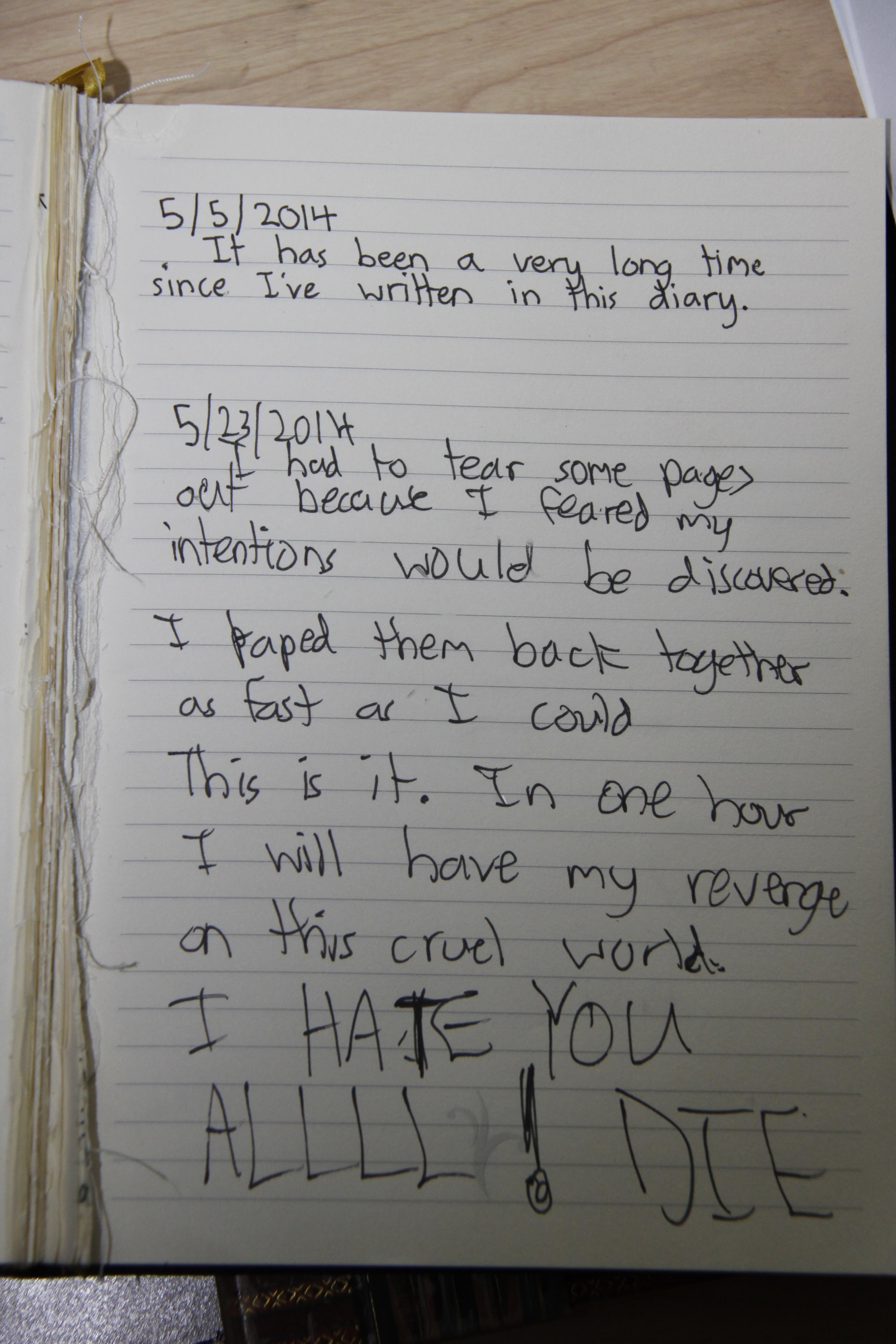
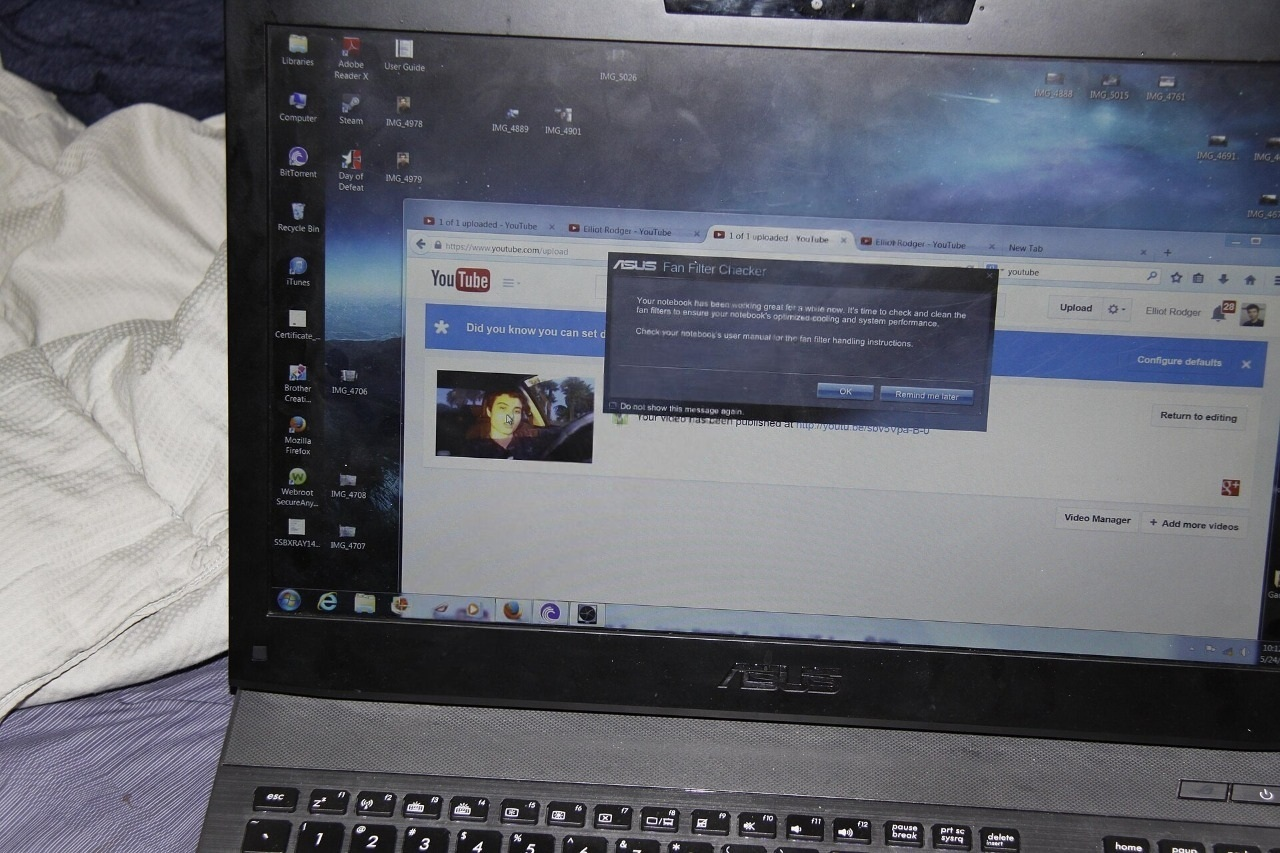
- Clockwise from top left: Rodger's corpse (yellow bag) and crashed BMW after the attack; CCTV image of people in Pizza My Heart hiding as Rodger fired into it; Screenshot of Rodger's "Retribution" video uploaded on YouTube; Rodger's final journal entry after killing his first three victims

- Isla Vista (southern California) Isla Vista (the United States)
- Location: 34.412°N 119.859°W; Isla Vista, California, U.S.
- Date: May 23, 2014; 12 years ago 9:27 – 9:35 p.m. (PDT; UTC−8:00)
- Target: Students of Santa Barbara City College and the University of California, Santa Barbara, roommates
- Attack type: Spree killing; murder–suicide; drive-by shooting; mass stabbing; school-related attack; mass shooting; mass murder; vehicle-ramming attack; shootout
- Weapons: Six-inch "SRK" knife; Eight-inch hunting knife; Glock 34 Long Slide handgun (unused); Two SIG Sauer P226 handguns (only one used); BMW 328i Coupé
- Deaths: 7 (3 by stabbing; 4 by gunfire, including the perpetrator)
- Injuries: 14 (7 by gunfire, 7 by vehicle-ramming)
- Perpetrator: Elliot Rodger
- Motive: Incel ideology; Misogynist terrorism; Revenge for perceived sexual and social rejection
- Litigation: Wrongful death lawsuit against Capri Apartments and the property management company settled with Hong's, Wang's, and Chen's parents for $20 million

On the evening of May 23, 2014, multiple misogynistic terrorist attacks occurred in Isla Vista, California, United States. 22-year-old Elliot Rodger murdered six people and injured 14 others by gunshot, stabbing, and vehicle ramming near the campus of the University of California, Santa Barbara (UCSB), before fatally shooting himself.

In Rodger's apartment, he ambushed and stabbed to death his two roommates and their friend, killing them separately as they arrived. About two hours later, he drove to a sorority house and, after failing to gain entry, he shot three women walking near the sorority house, two of whom died. He then drove past a nearby delicatessen, and shot and killed a man who was inside. Following this, he drove around Isla Vista, shooting from his car and wounding several pedestrians, both with gunfire and his car. He exchanged gunfire with police twice and was injured in the hip. After Rodger's car crashed into a parked vehicle, he was found dead inside with a self-inflicted gunshot wound to the head.

Before driving to the sorority house, Rodger uploaded a video entitled "Elliot Rodger's Retribution", in which he outlined his attack plan and motives, to YouTube. In the video, Rodger said he wanted to "punish" women for rejecting him, and sexually active men because he envied them. He also emailed a lengthy, autobiographical manuscript to friends, family members, and his therapist; the document appeared on the Internet and became widely known as his manifesto. In the document, Rodger described his childhood, family conflicts, frustration over his inability to find a girlfriend, his hatred of women, his contempt for couples, and his plans for "retribution".

== Background ==
Elliot Oliver Robertson Rodger was born on July 24, 1991, in London, England. Rodger faced mental health problems as a child; he struggled in social situations, often cried in crowds, and displayed repetitive behaviors. He repeatedly talked about killing himself but had no history of violence. In 2007, he was diagnosed with pervasive developmental disorder not otherwise specified. As an adult, he showed anger toward couples and had difficulties socializing.

Rodger wrote a 137-page manifesto titled My Twisted World: The Story of Elliot Rodger about his life and frustrations at never having had sexual intercourse, a situation for which he blamed women. In his manifesto, Rodger wrote about his plan to carry out an attack, calling it a "Day of Retribution". Initially, Rodger was unsure whether to target Santa Barbara City College or Isla Vista for his attacks, but ultimately chose Isla Vista. He had planned to drive to his father's home where he intended to kill his stepmother Soumaya Akaaboune and half-brother. He intended to steal their car and drive it back to Isla Vista, targeting the Alpha Phi sorority house with plans to kill its occupants before setting it on fire. Rodger then planned to shoot and/or run over as many people with the car as possible in Isla Vista.

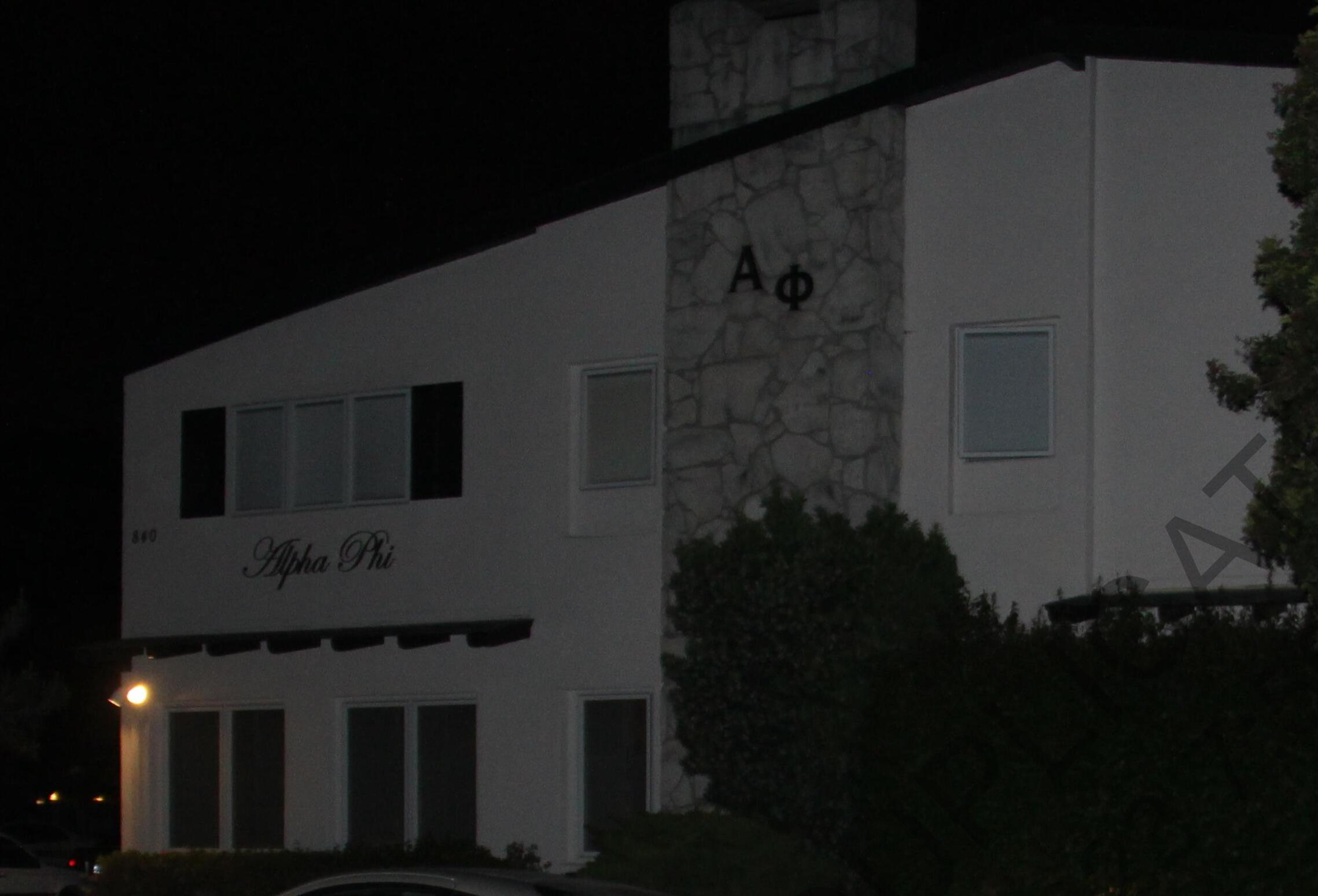
Rodger planned to target the Alpha Phi sorority house.

Rodger posted videos to YouTube describing his views on life and frustrations at his romantic failures. In April 2014, he uploaded to YouTube videos expressing his deep loneliness and frustration at his unsuccessful attempts at attracting a girlfriend. He also posted on misogynistic and anti-feminism online forums like PUAHate. Denizens of these forums, including Rodger, identified themselves as "involuntary celibates" or "incels"; they discussed their difficulties with finding a romantic or sexual partner, and expressed disdain towards women and pick-up artists.

In February 2012, after being unable to find a girlfriend, Rodger wrote in his manifesto that he "knew that the Day of Retribution was now very possible". He became fixated on winning a lottery, believing gaining wealth was the only way for him to attain a sexual experience. By June 2012, Rodger wrote he would not carry out his attacks if he won the Mega Millions jackpot. When he did not win the jackpot in September 2012, he visited a gun range in Oxnard, California. In November 2012, he bought Powerball lottery tickets, but after failing to win, he began to actively plan his attack. He purchased firearms between December 2012 and 2014. From February through April 2014, Rodger visited gun ranges and purchased ammunition. Rodger had planned but rejected Halloween 2013 and Valentine's Day 2014 as the attacks date due to concerns over the police presence, decided to delay his attack until early 2014, eventually selecting April 26, 2014, as the new date for his attack. On April 24, due to a cold, he postponed his attack to May 24, 2014.

== Attacks ==
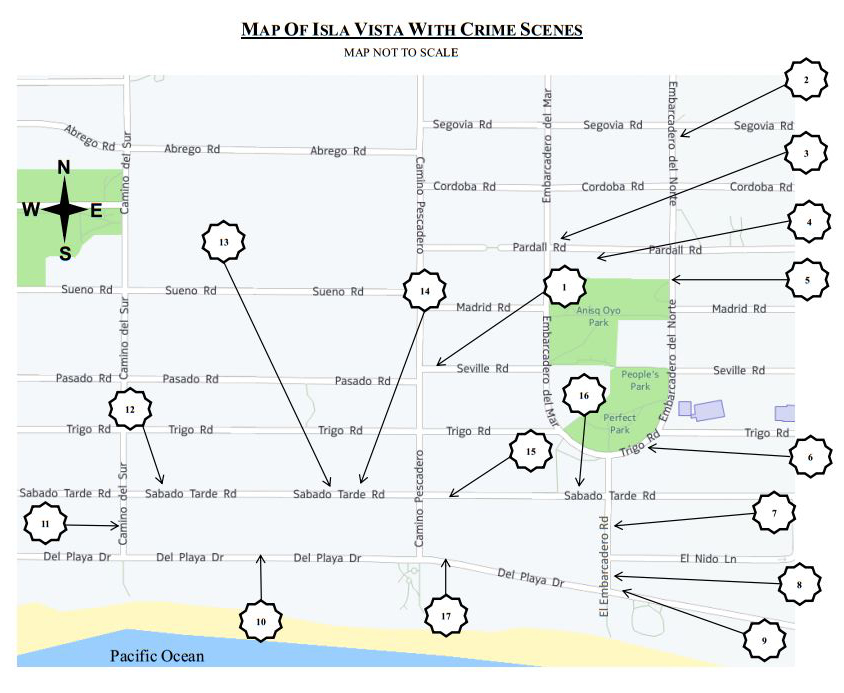
A map showing the order and locations of Rodger's attacks

=== Stabbings ===
Despite initially selecting May 24 as the date for his attacks, Rodger unexpectedly initiated his attacks a day earlier. Rodger, carrying a six-inch (150 mm) "SRK" knife and an eight-inch (200 mm) hunting knife, ambushed his 20-year-old roommate Weihan "David" Wang upon his return to their residence at Capri Apartments. Wang tried to defend himself but was stabbed 15 times, suffering 23 slashes. Rodger moved Wang's body to the corner of a bedroom, threw it face-down on the floor, and partially covered it with blankets, towels, and clothing. Soon after, Rodger attacked his other roommate, 20-year-old Cheng Yuan "James" Hong, after he entered the apartment. Despite his attempts to defend himself, Hong was overwhelmed, receiving 25 stab wounds and 12 slashes. Five of the stab wounds were inflicted on Hong's back after he died. Rodger dragged Hong's body to the same bedroom, throwing it face down and half-on-top of Wang's body, and concealed it with blankets and clothing.

Nineteen-year-old George Chen, a friend of Hong and Wang, arrived at the apartment to visit them. Upon entering, Rodger ambushed Chen, inflicting 94 stab wounds and 11 slashes as Chen attempted to defend himself. Rodger left Chen's bleeding body in a bathroom. He attempted to clean the apartment and hide evidence of the earlier stabbings as each victim entered using bathroom towels and paper towels, which quickly became soaked in blood. Despite his efforts, blood remained splattered on the hallways and walls.

=== Rodger's final communications ===
After failing to clean up the blood, Rodger changed out of his blood-drenched clothes and entangled them with his bed sheets. He showered, put on new clothes, and went to a Starbucks coffee house around 7:38 p.m. He purchased a triple-vanilla latte while texting his mother saying he was done with school and would call her later. He returned to his apartment and wrote in his journal:

I had to tear some pages out because I feared my intentions would be discovered. I taped them back together as fast as I could. This is it. In one hour I will have my revenge on this cruel world. I HATE YOU ALLLL! DIE.

Minutes before his planned attack on the Alpha Phi sorority house, Rodger uploaded a seven-minute video called "Elliot Rodger's Retribution" to the video-sharing platform YouTube. (Note: Attributed to multiple references:) Rodger recorded two takes of his "Retribution" video in his car, the first attempt at which was interrupted by a passing jogger. In the second take he uploaded, Rodger is seen sitting in his car at sunset reciting scripted lines and emitting fake laughter. (Note: Attributed to multiple references:) In the video, Rodger said he was frustrated at remaining a virgin at 22, that he would "punish" women for rejecting him despite being an "alpha male" and a "supreme gentleman", and expressed his hatred for sexually active men. (Note: Attributed to multiple references:)

Rodger then emailed his 137-page manifesto to 34 people, including his parents, therapists, former teachers, and childhood friends, with the message: "Attached is Elliot Rodger's life story, which explains how I came to be the way I am".

=== Shootings and vehicle attacks ===
At around 9 p.m., Rodger arrived at the Alpha Phi sorority house with three semi-automatic pistols, additional ammunition strapped to his waist, and a full gas can. The sorority house had a heavy, wooden, double door with an electronic keypad.

Rodger tried to open the house's door, pulling on the handle then typing on the keypad numerous times. He then aggressively knocked on the door for over three minutes. Approximately 40 residents of the sorority house were visiting Las Vegas while those remaining felt too tired to answer the door. (Note: Attributed to multiple references:) Rodger became frustrated at the unanswered door and set down the gas can. Rodger returned to his car and, around 9:27 p.m., noticed three women walking near the sorority house; these were 19-year-old Veronika Weiss, 22-year-old Katherine "Katie" Cooper, and a 20-year-old woman, all of whom were members of the sorority Delta Delta Delta. (Note: Attributed to multiple references:) As the women were walking back to their Delta Delta Delta sorority house, Rodger slowly approached them in his car and fired multiple shots at them through an open window. (Note: Attributed to multiple references:) As Rodger sped away, the 20-year-old woman managed to call her mother, repeatedly crying she was going to die.

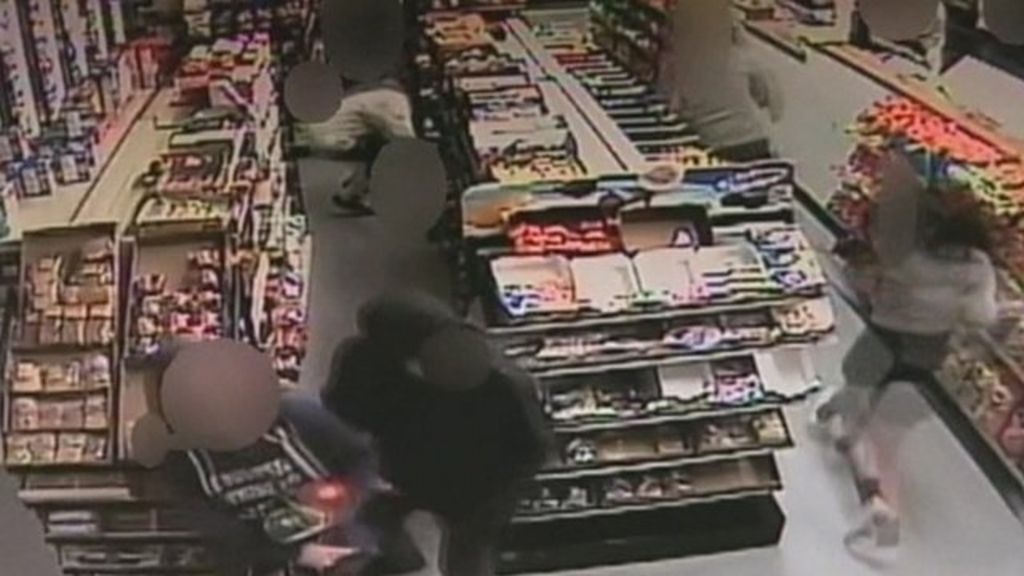
CCTV image of people in the IV Deli Mart running for cover as Rodger fired into it

People heard screaming and saw the three women bleeding on the grass, and rushed to a sheriff's deputy for help. The deputy quickly arrived and applied pressure to the 20-year-old woman's wounds. One person began administering cardiopulmonary resuscitation (CPR) to Cooper, and another tried to comfort Weiss by holding her head and speaking to her. More bystanders arrived, and the deputy told them to check if the women had a pulse and to start chest compressions. Additional sheriff's deputies arrived and started helping, while another bystander used a sweatshirt to apply pressure to one of Cooper's gunshot wounds. Despite their efforts, Cooper and Weiss died from their injuries. (Note: Attributed to multiple references:) Weiss was shot seven times, with six bullets striking between her legs, buttocks, and groin. The fatal shot pierced her heart and both lungs. Cooper was shot eight times and suffered multiple fatal injuries, including gunshots to her lungs and the side of her head. A bystander then took over the aid of the 20-year-old woman while deputies chased down Rodger. Bystanders told the 20-year-old woman's mother on her phone her daughter would survive.

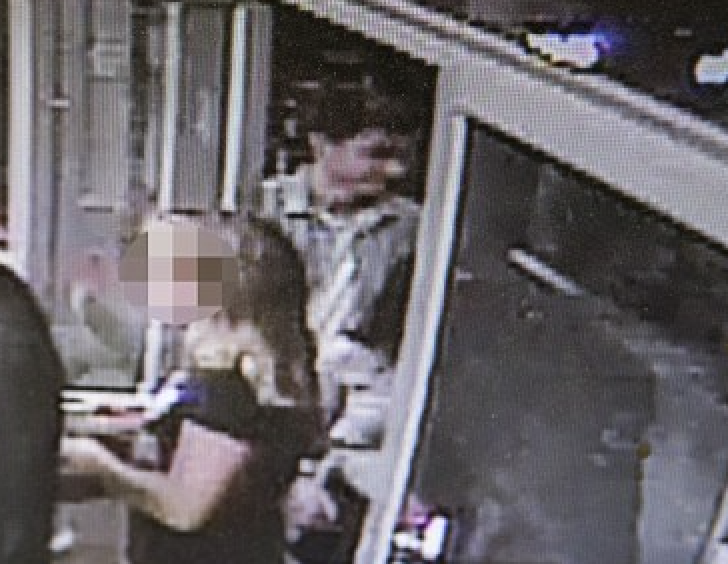
Michaels-Martinez entering the IV Deli Mart moments before getting shot by Rodger

After driving away from the sorority house, Rodger executed a three-point turn in a driveway along Pardall Road and discharged a shot toward a closed coffee shop. He drove to a store called IV Deli Mart, where he fired a barrage at nearby individuals. (Note: Attributed to multiple references:) Christopher "Chris" Michaels-Martinez, 20, who was at the deli's entrance, was shot once in the chest when he turned around to look at Rodger's car, resulting in injuries to his liver and the right ventricle of his heart. (Note: Attributed to multiple references:) Michaels-Martinez entered the store but fell to the ground. People inside took cover as Rodger continued to fire shots into the store, shattering windows. (Note: Attributed to multiple references:) Rodger then drove away. Despite CPR attempts from five bystanders and sheriff's deputies, Michaels-Martinez died. (Note: Attributed to multiple references:)

Rodger continued driving, struck a man with his vehicle, and knocked him into the air. While driving on Trigo Road, Rodger fired at and wounded a couple exiting a Pizza My Heart restaurant. The man was shot in the left arm and the woman was shot in her upper-right forearm. The man ran in the opposite direction while the woman ran back into the restaurant. Rodger fired shots into the restaurant before speeding away. Driving on the wrong side of the road in Embarcadero del Norte, Rodger shot a female cyclist in the right thigh. He then encountered a woman walking alone. Rodger called out: "Hey, what's up?", making the woman acknowledge him as she continued walking. (Note: Attributed to multiple references:) He raised a gun from his car window, leading the woman to initially believe it was an airsoft gun, then shot at her numerous times, narrowly missing her head, and prompting her to run away and scream for help. (Note: Attributed to multiple references:)

Rodger then drove to Del Playa Drive, where he saw a sheriff's deputy and fired shots. As he sped away, the deputy returned fire, discharging a single round. Rodger then struck two men with his car, driving to Camino Del Sur where he shot a man in the right forearm and right buttock. Rodger proceeded to Sabado Tarde Road, hitting a male cyclist and two male skateboarders. He encountered two men in a driveway and shot them several times. Near Little Acorn Park, Rodger saw four sheriff's deputies, engaged three of them in a shootout, and received a gunshot wound to his hip.

At around 9:35 p.m., Rodger turned onto several streets, and fatally shot himself in the head, causing his car to veer and hit a male cyclist, who tumbled on the vehicle and damaged the car's windshield. Rodger's car eventually crashed into a parked vehicle. As police officers surrounded Rodger's car, they mistakenly handcuffed the injured cyclist, initially suspecting him to be a second assailant. Realizing their error, they gave him medical attention, acknowledging him as a victim. Upon searching Rodger's vehicle, police discovered his body and found a self-inflicted gunshot wound to his head. (Note: Attributed to multiple references:)

=== Vehicle search ===
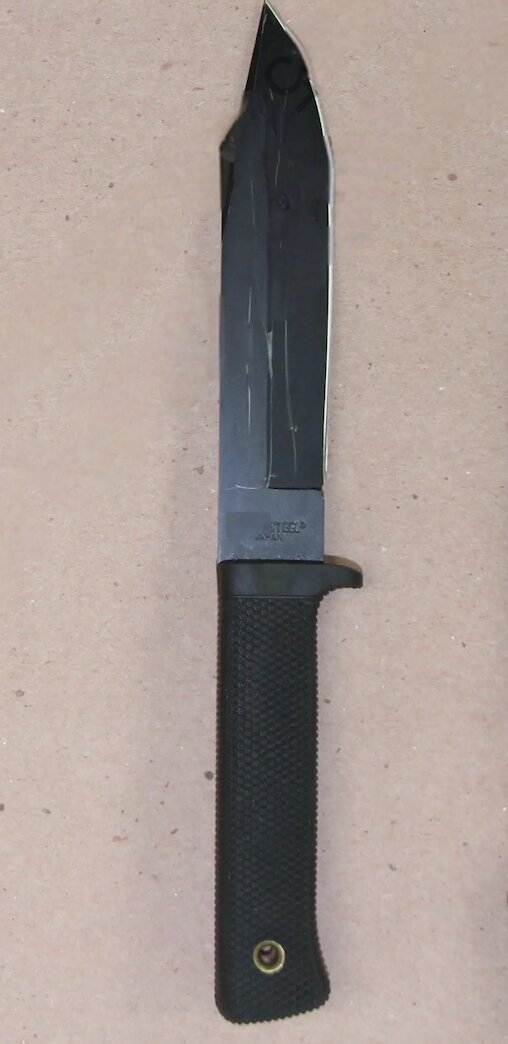
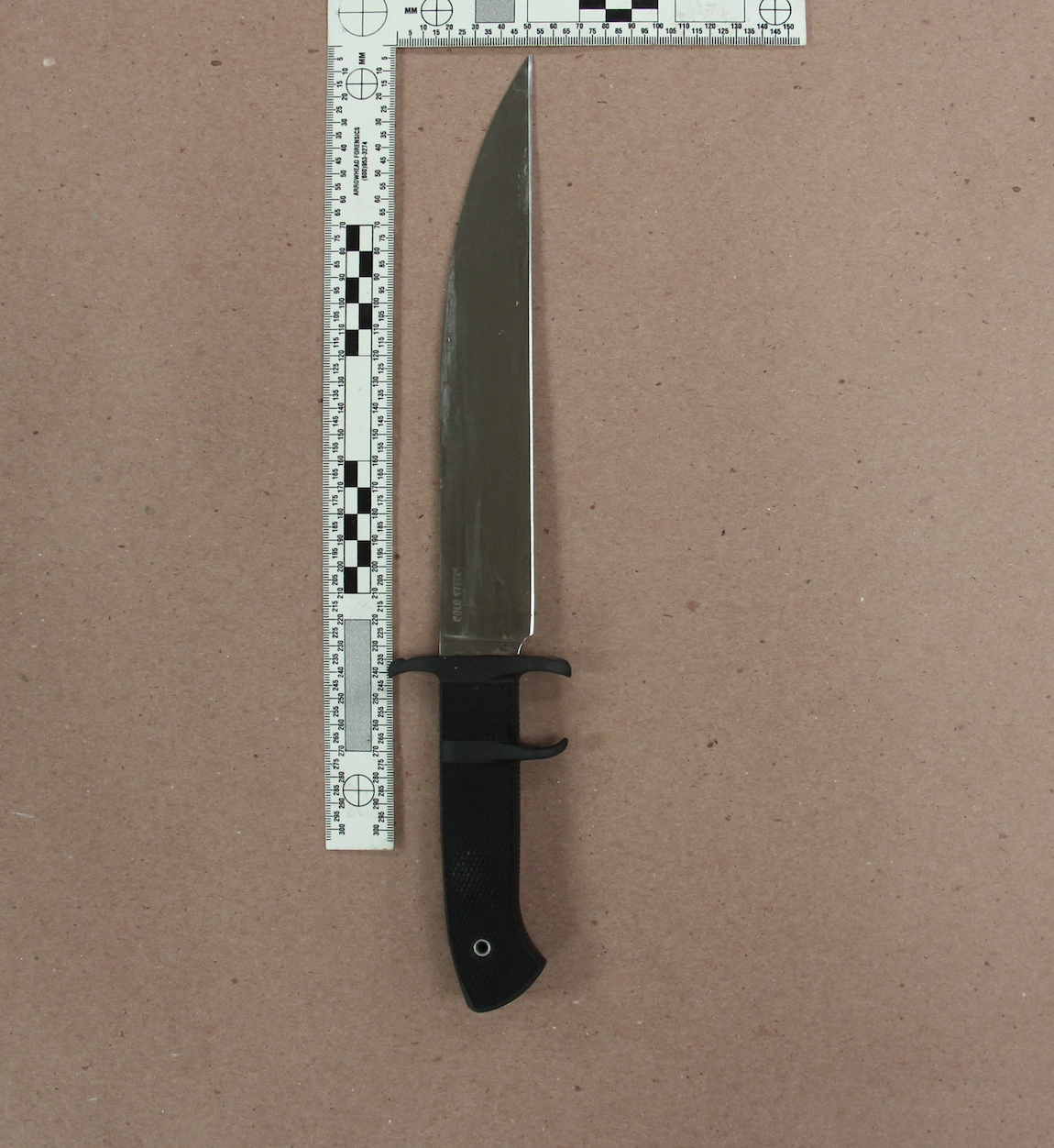
The two knives Rodger used to kill his two roommates and their friend

Inside Rodger's car, police found a Glock 34 Long Slide handgun with seven loaded, 10-round magazines; two SIG Sauer P226 handguns with 34 loaded, 10-round magazines; over 500 rounds of live ammunition; and the two knives he used to kill his two roommates and their friend. The shootings lasted eight minutes, during which Rodger discharged approximately 55 9mm rounds. (Note: Attributed to multiple references:) During the shootings, Rodger used only one of the Sig Sauer P226 pistols, which was discovered on the driver's seat of his car.

=== Victims killed ===
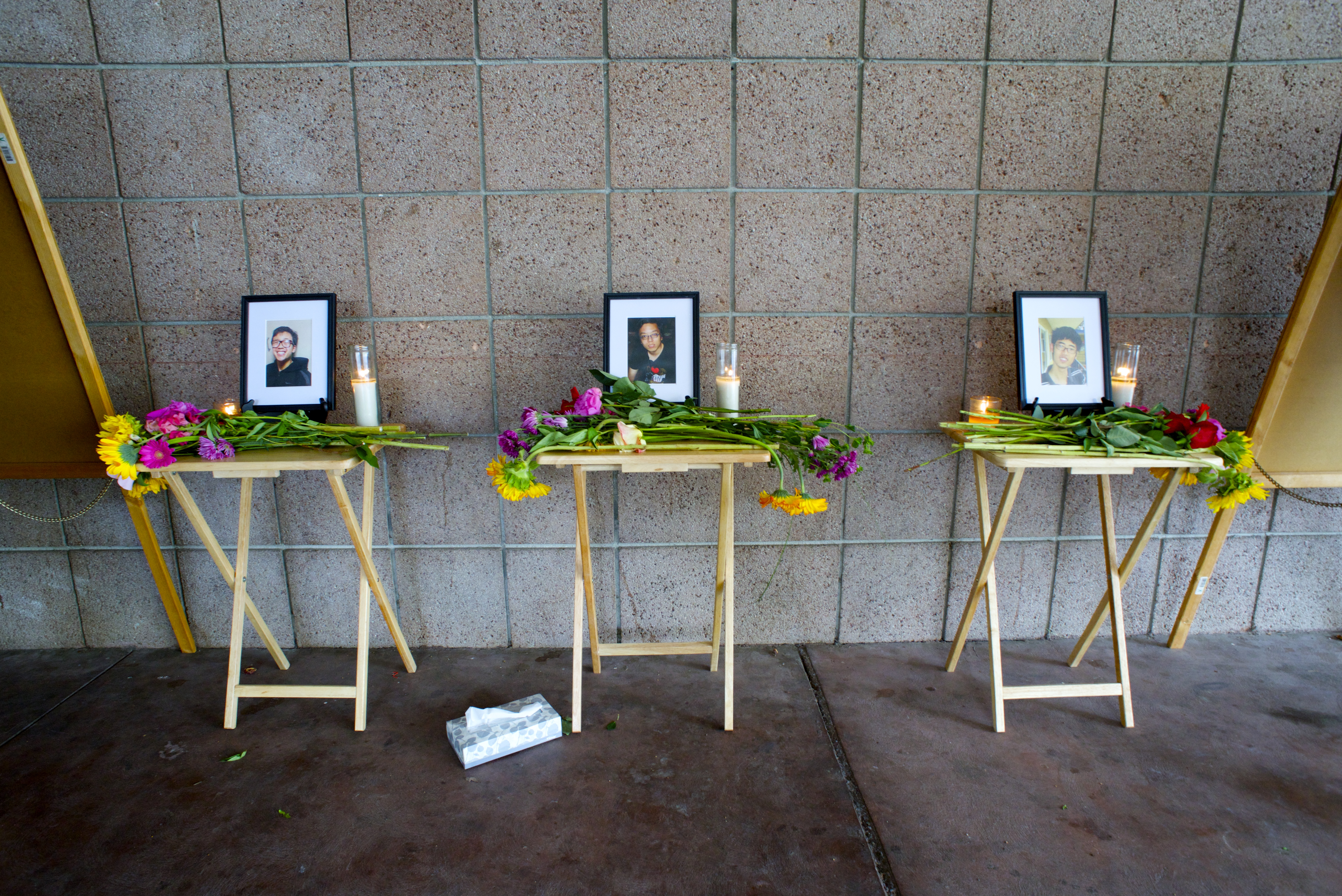
Memorial wall honoring the first three victims killed in the 2014 Isla Vista killings. From left to right: George Chen, Weihan "David" Wang, and Cheng Yuan "James" Hong

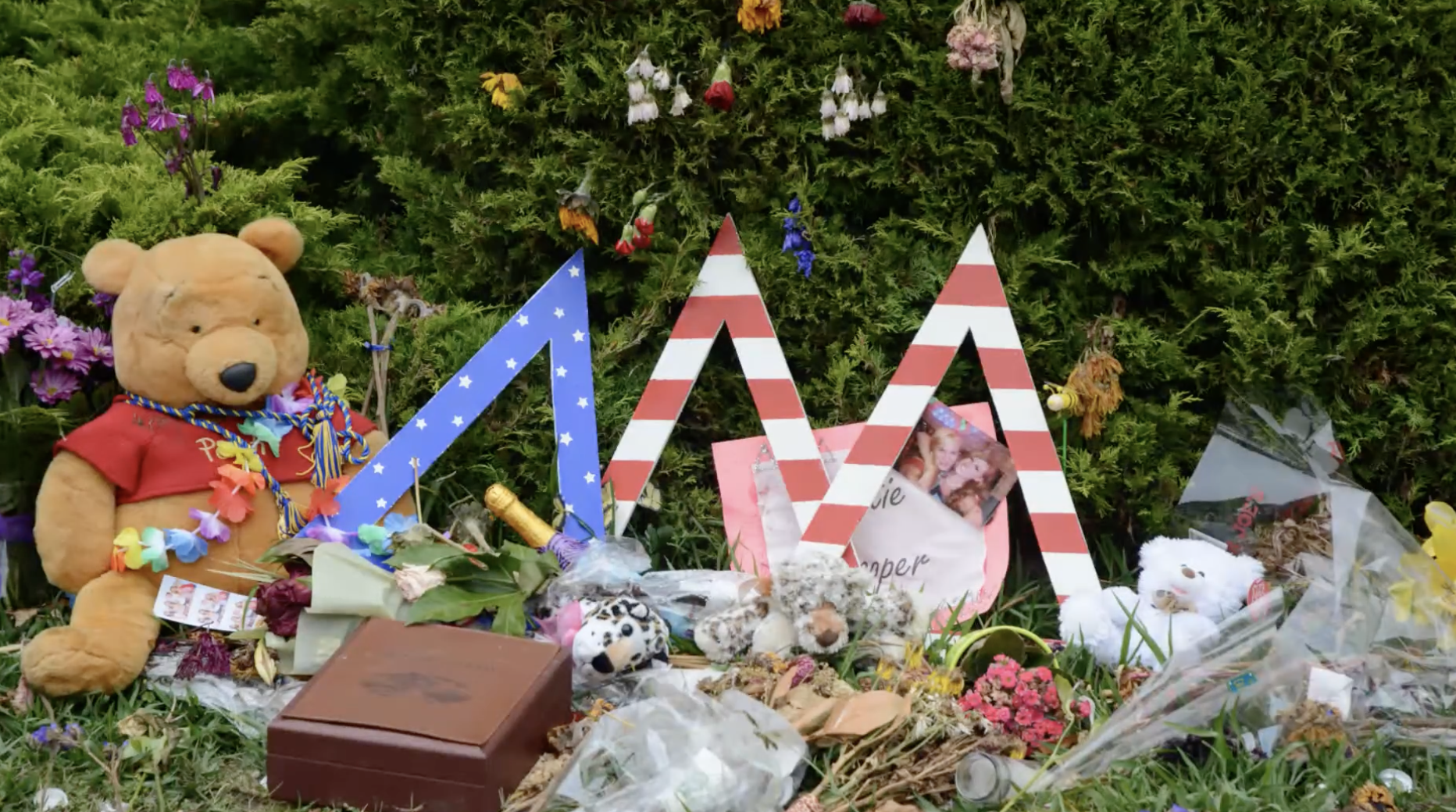
Memorial service outside the Alpha Phi sorority house for Veronika Weiss and Katherine Cooper

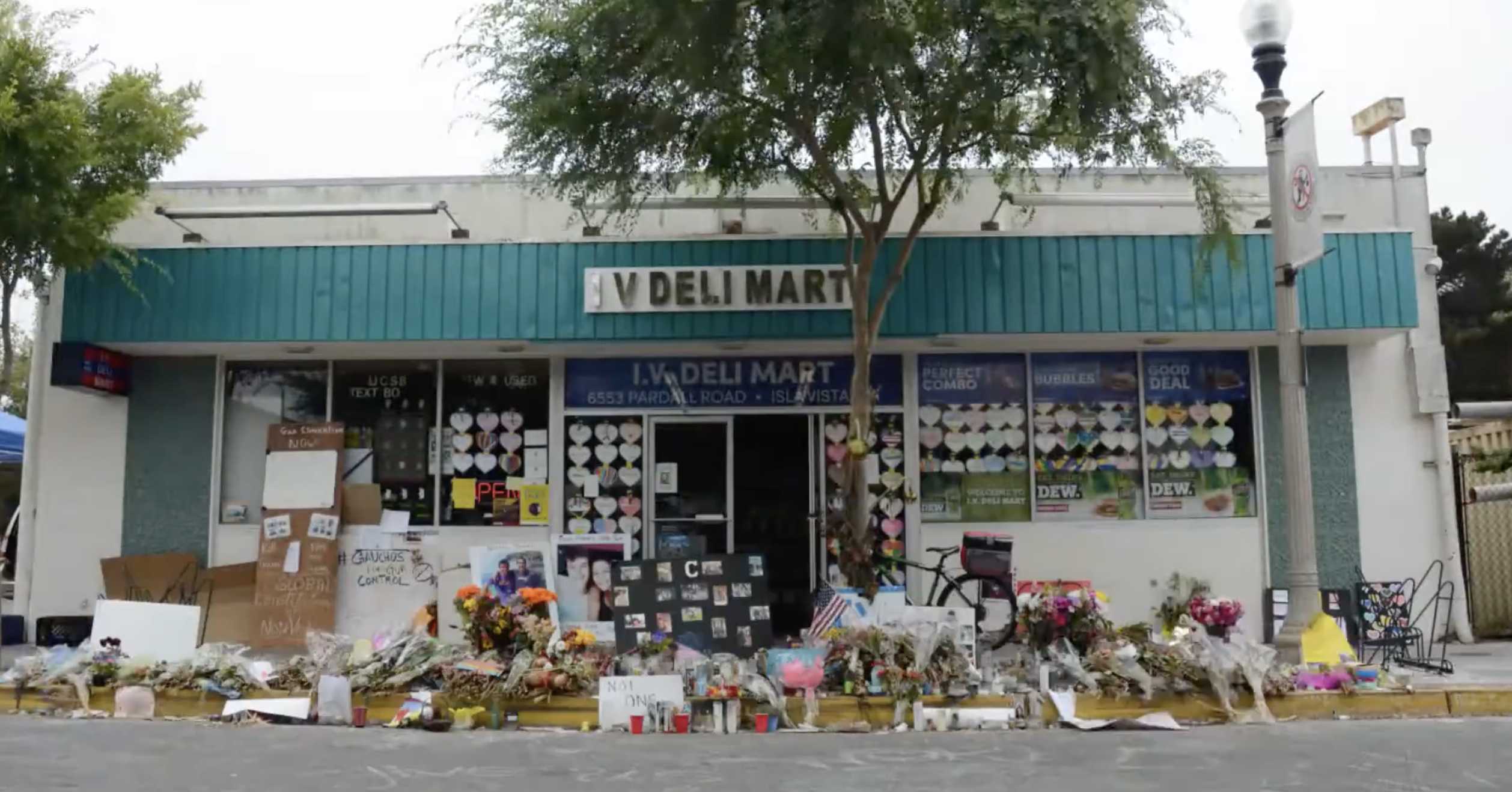
Memorial service outside the IV Deli Mart for Christopher Michaels-Martinez

During his attack, Rodger killed six people, all of whom were students of University of California, Santa Barbara, and injured 14 others—seven by gunfire and seven whom he hit with his vehicle. (Note: Attributed to multiple references:)

- 20-year-old Weihan "David" Wang (July 6, 1993, Tianjin, China — May 23, 2014), sophomore majoring in computer engineering, stabbed to death (Note: Attributed to multiple references:)
- 20-year-old Cheng Yuan "James" Hong (April 15, 1994, Taipei, Taiwan — May 23, 2014), sophomore majoring in computer engineering, stabbed to death (Note: Attributed to multiple references:)
- 19-year-old George Chen (September 19, 1994, Ottawa, Canada — May 23, 2014), sophomore majoring in computer science, stabbed to death (Note: Attributed to multiple references:)
- 19-year-old Veronika Elizabeth Weiss (February 24, 1995, Seattle, Washington — May 23, 2014), freshman majoring in financial mathematics and statistics, shot to death (Note: Attributed to multiple references:)
- 22-year-old Katherine "Katie" Breann Cooper (December 26, 1991, San Bernardino, California — May 23, 2014), senior double majoring in art history and classics and archeology, shot to death (Note: Attributed to multiple references:)
- 20-year-old Christopher "Chris" Ross Michaels-Martinez (December 23, 1993, San Luis Obispo, California — May 23, 2014), sophomore majoring in English, shot to death (Note: Attributed to multiple references:)

== Aftermath ==
=== Actions by Rodger's parents ===
At around 10 p.m., Rodger's mother, Ong Li Chin Tye, received a text message from Rodger's life coach Gavin Linderman that she initially ignored. Linderman then called her, telling her Rodger had sent an email and said he also discovered her son's "Retribution" video online, advising her to check them. Li Chin accessed the email, which contained his manifesto, and his video. (Note: Attributed to multiple references:) She immediately called Rodger's cellphone, which went to voicemail. Rodger's mother then called Santa Barbara police, telling them she needed to locate Rodger. Li Chin then called Rodger's father, Peter Rodger, who was dining with friends, and informed him of what she had been told. Li Chin, alone, drove toward Isla Vista while Rodger's father, stepmother, and their friends traveled in another car. As they separately approached Isla Vista, Li Chin called Rodger's apartment building manager, asking them to check if her son was in his room. The manager told her there had been a shooting and car chase in Isla Vista and that access to the building was restricted until the next morning.

Rodger's father repeatedly hit redial on his phone while trying to contact his son. As they neared Isla Vista, they heard radio reports of an active shooter in a black BMW near UCSB. Both of Rodger's parents then received a call from a sheriff's detective, who asked whether their son had ever owned any guns. Li Chin was surprised by the inquiry because Rodger had never shown any interest in firearms. She told the detective that Rodger had social problems and saw a therapist and that she had been unable to reach him for several hours. The detective instructed Rodger's parents to meet them at a parking lot near Isla Vista. When a sheriff arrived around 1 a.m., Li Chin demanded to know her son's whereabouts. The sheriff said Rodger had been found dead and that his driver's license confirmed his identity. Rodger's parents later said they were devastated by the news and initially believed their son was among the victims. Peter stated that he learned subsequently that his son was the perpetrator after reports identified him.

=== Searches and questioning ===
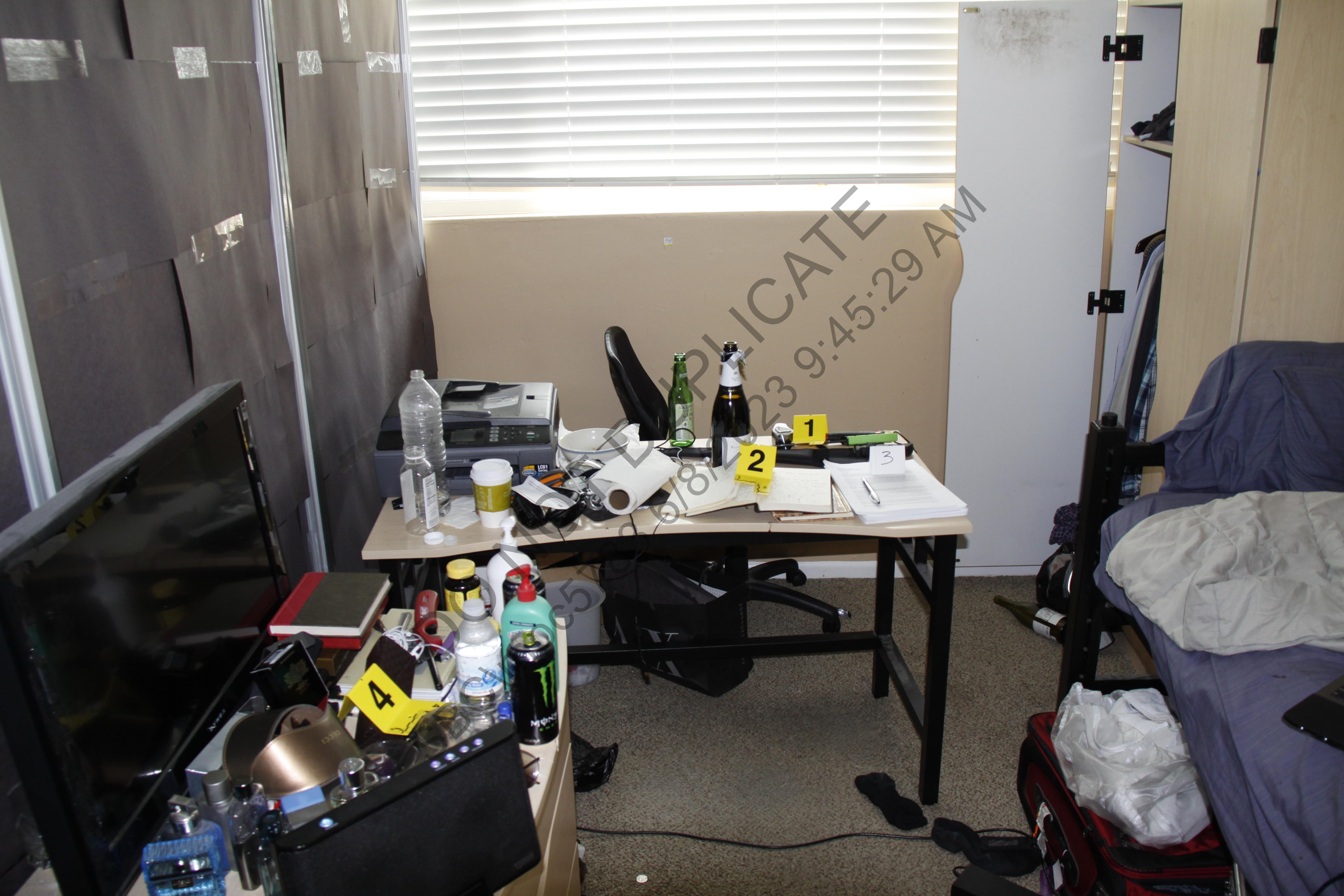
Rodger's apartment room

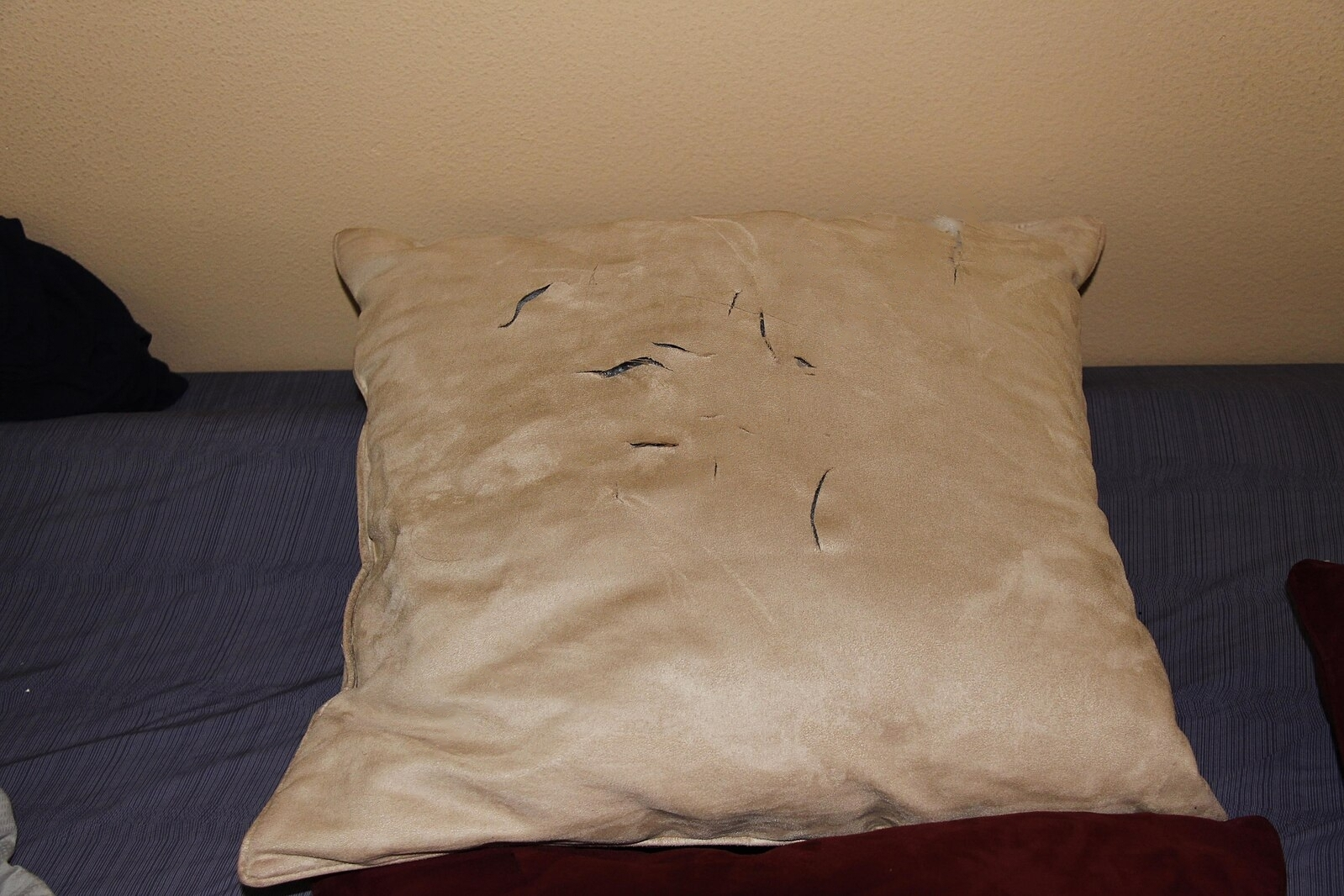
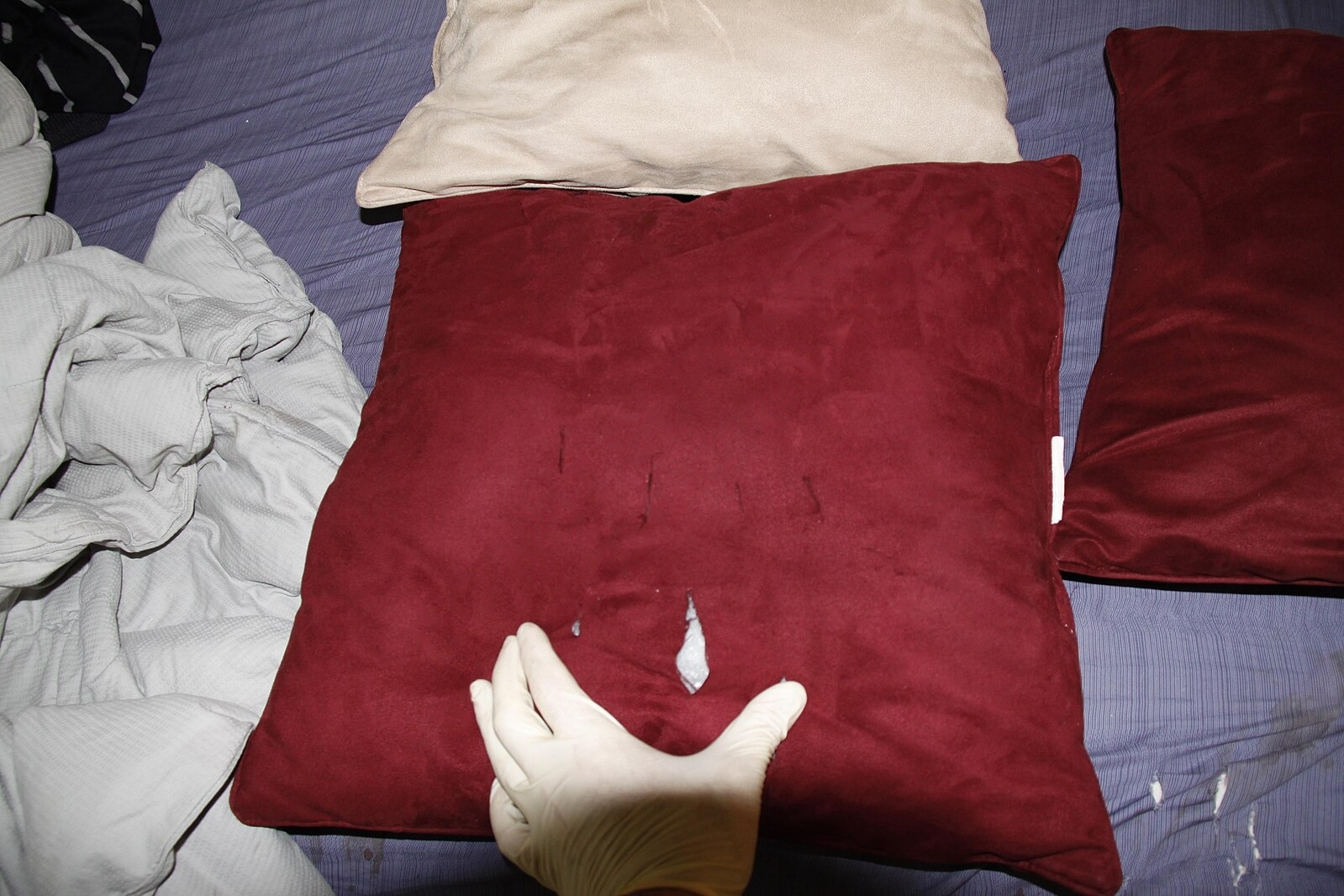
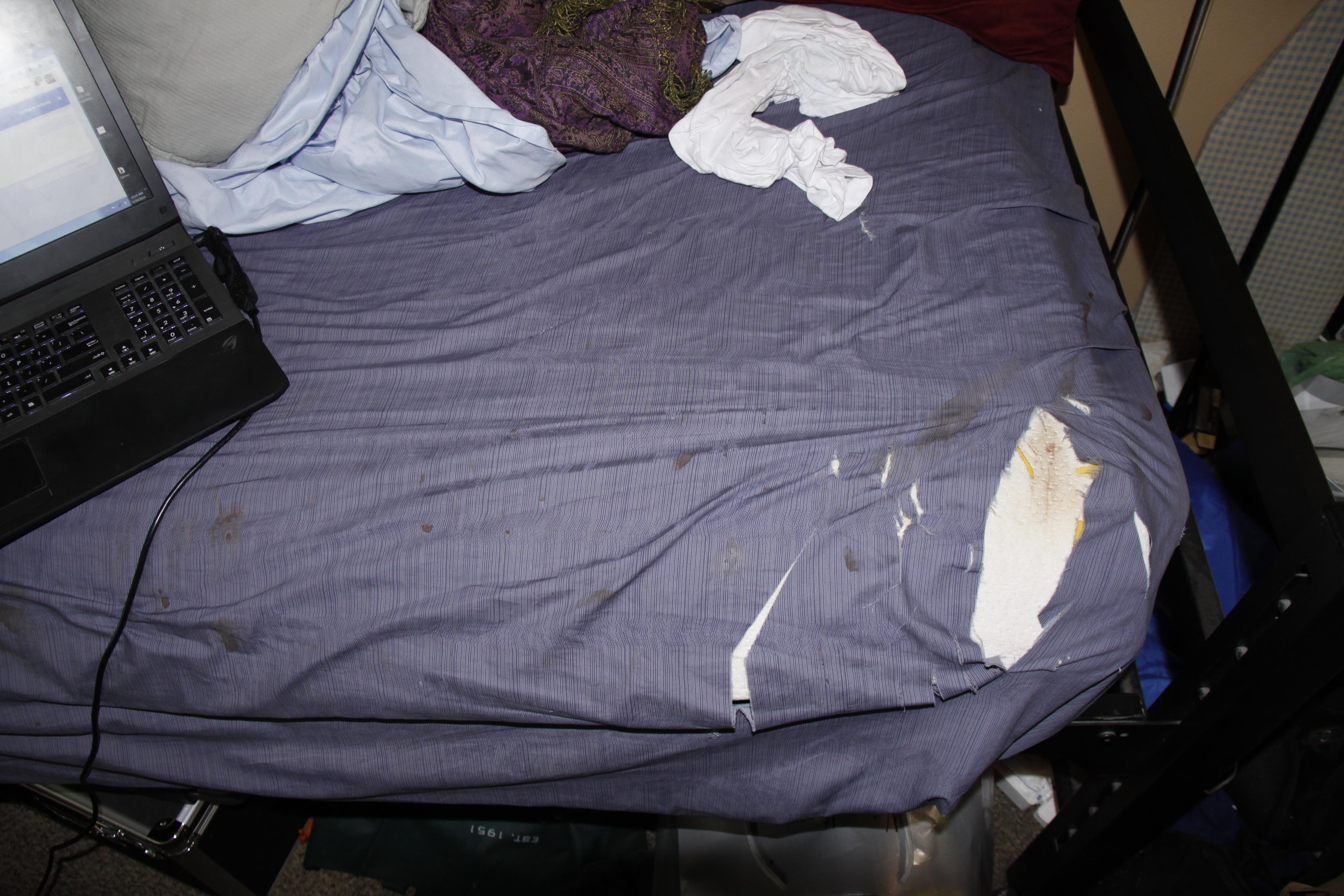
Some of the pillows and bedsheets Rodger practiced stabbing repeatedly before killing his first three victims

Police obtained a search warrant and conducted a protective sweep of Rodger's apartment around midnight on May 24. They had grown concerned for the safety of Rodger's two roommates and feared he might have set booby traps in the apartment. After removing a window screen, police found Chen's body lying in a fetal position on the bathroom floor.

They breached the apartment and also found the bodies of Hong and Wang in their bedroom. In Rodger's room, which was messy, police found pharmacy documents for prescriptions, two gun cleaning kits, empty ammunition boxes and magazines, energy drinks, lottery tickets, a copy of The Art of Seduction by Robert Greene, video games, and a Starbucks coffee cup. Police also found a folding knife, a "zombie killer" knife with a ten-inch (250 mm) blade, an eighteen-inch (460 mm)-blade machete, a sledgehammer, and other knives. Police discovered a long-sleeve shirt and jeans that were soaked in dried blood and entangled in Rodger's bedsheets. They found multiple stab marks on his bedsheets and pillows, indicating that Rodger was practicing how to stab before attacking his roommates and their friend. Police also discovered two journals in which Rodger expressed his growing frustration at his inability to form relationships with women, a hand-drawn illustration of a stabbing, and a printed version of his 137-page manifesto. Rodger's laptop was found displaying the YouTube "Retribution" video, which showed that it had just finished uploading.

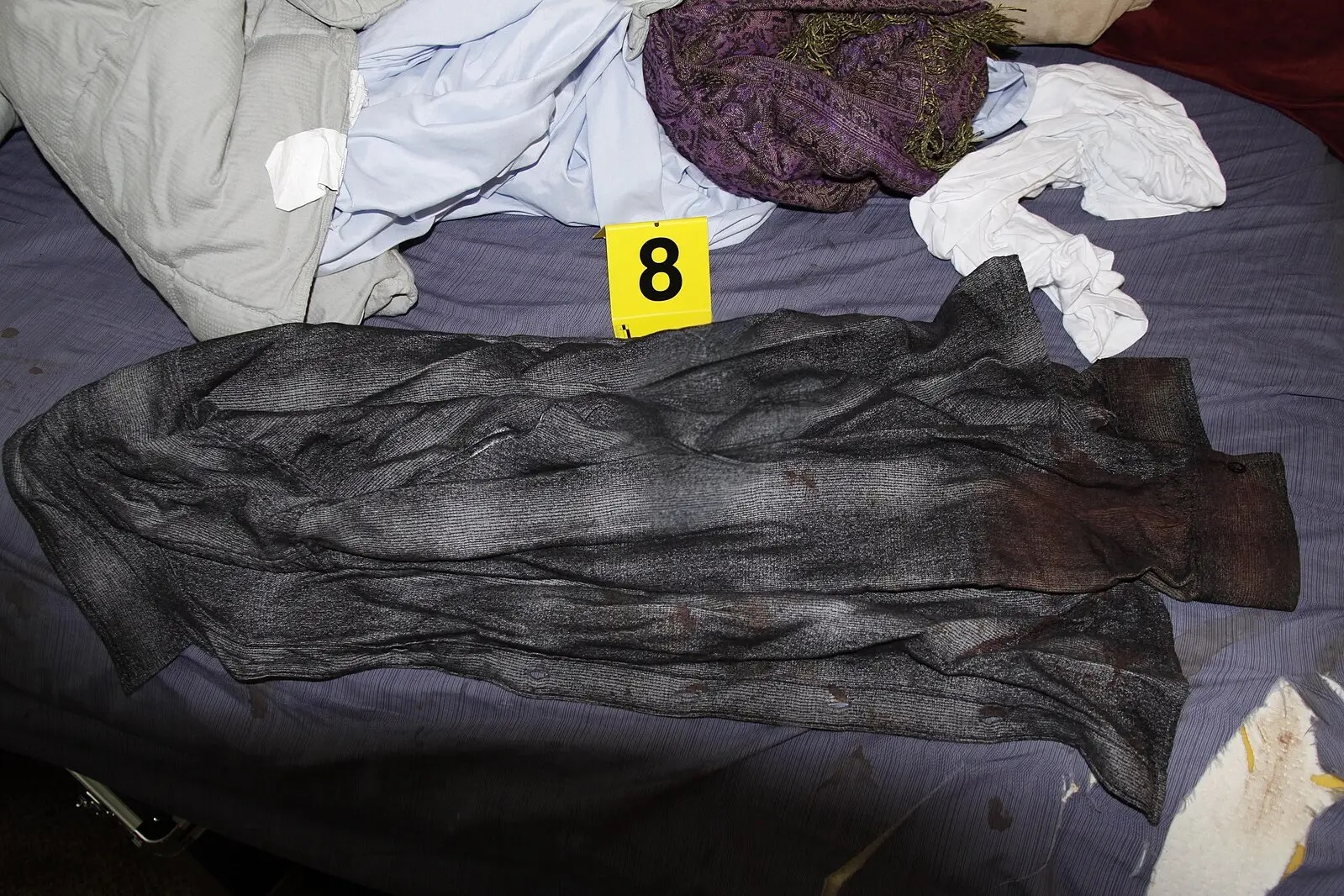
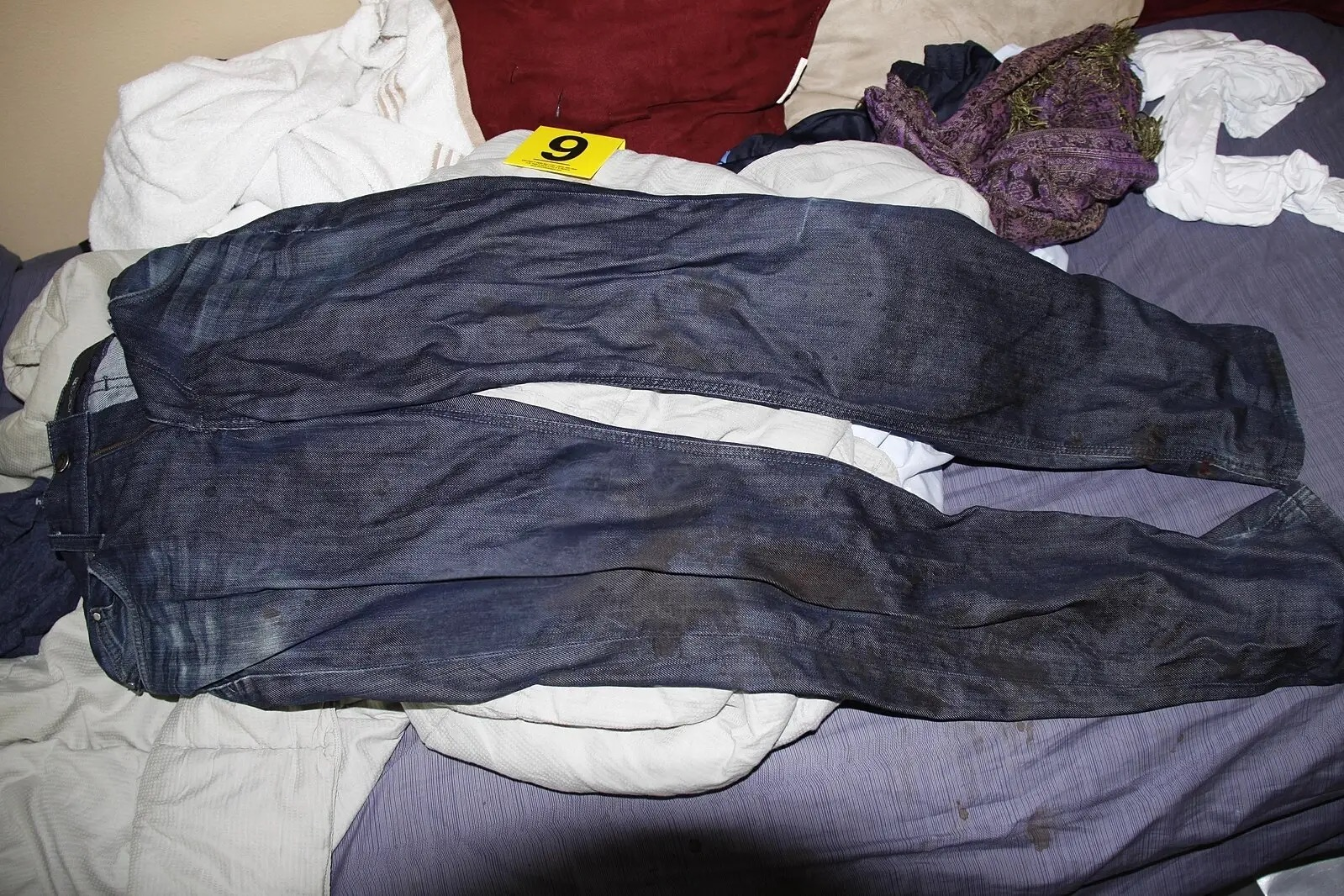
The clothes Rodger wore while killing his two roommates and their friend

Police and the Bureau of Alcohol, Tobacco, Firearms and Explosives (ATF) executed search warrants at the homes of Rodger's parents, first at his father's home in Woodland Hills and then at his mother's house in West Hills. Police also obtained search warrants for the cellphone records of Rodger and his roommates. Upon examining Rodger's cellphone, they found over 492 images and videos, including over 200 selfies. Due to his attacks, media swarmed Rodger's family, who received death threats, forcing them to move every two days. Li Chin became worried about her daughter's safety and sent her to live with family abroad temporarily. Li Chin and Peter stayed at a hotel, and met with friends at a restaurant to discuss their situation.

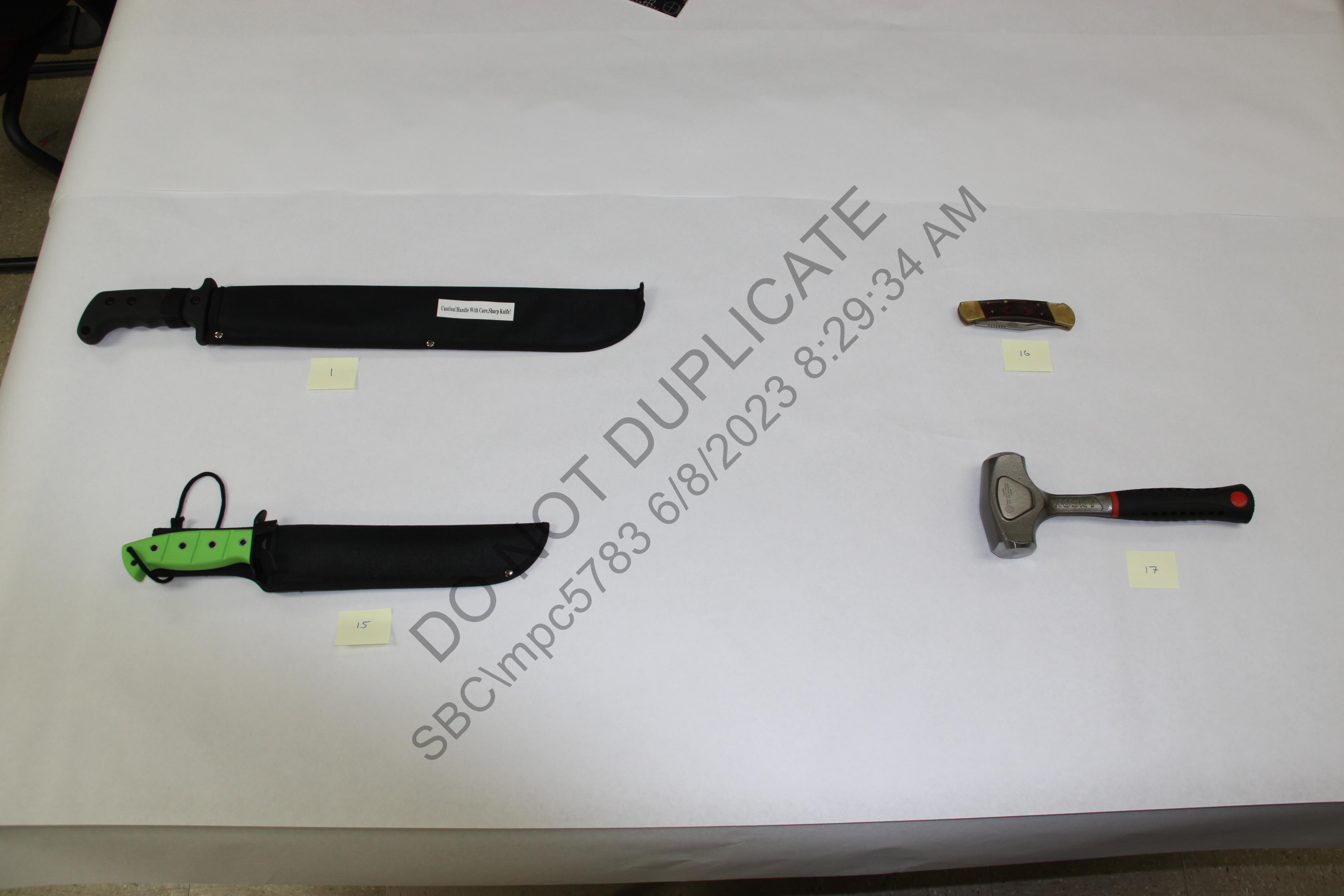
Some of the weapons found in Rodger's apartment

An autopsy of Rodger's body concluded he died by suicide from a gunshot wound to the head and had drugs in his body. In June 2014, his body was cremated and released from the coroner's office to his family, who held a private ceremony and planned to hold a funeral in England later that year. Rodger's aunt described him as a "loner" and a "sick, disturbed young man" who was "very dark" and "very depressed". She questioned how Rodger was allowed to access firearms despite showing signs of mental decline and criticized the United States and its gun laws. She also offered her condolences to the victims and their families. In interviews with the Daily Mail and Kent Online, Rodger's paternal grandmother described him as "very sick" and a "disturbed boy", mentioning that if her husband were still alive, he would be in "terrible shock". In June 2014, Rodger's father met with Richard Martinez, the father of Michaels-Martinez, to discuss Michaels-Martinez and his life. (Note: Attributed to multiple references:) During an interview, Peter told Barbara Walters despite his son's long history of social problems and years of therapy, he never thought his son was capable of murder. Peter said his son was good at hiding his true emotions, expressed sorrow for the pain caused to the victims' families, and said he would help prevent future mass killings. (Note: Attributed to multiple references:) Five years after Rodger's attack, his mother searched mass shootings online and found threat assessment. She later began participating in threat assessment training sessions, sharing her experiences and hoping people will find warning signs of individuals in mental distress.

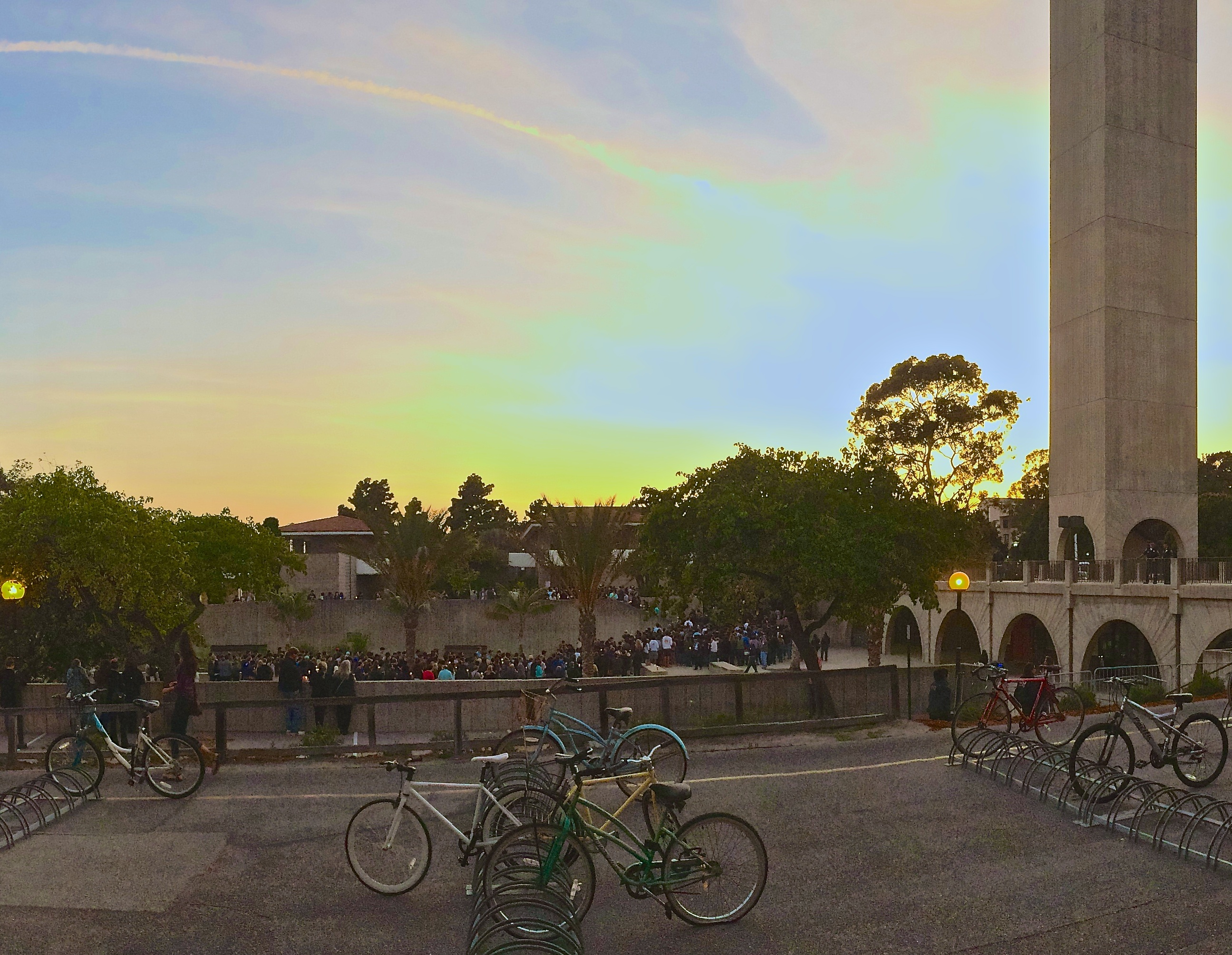
Memorial held for the victims on May 24, 2014

=== Memorials ===
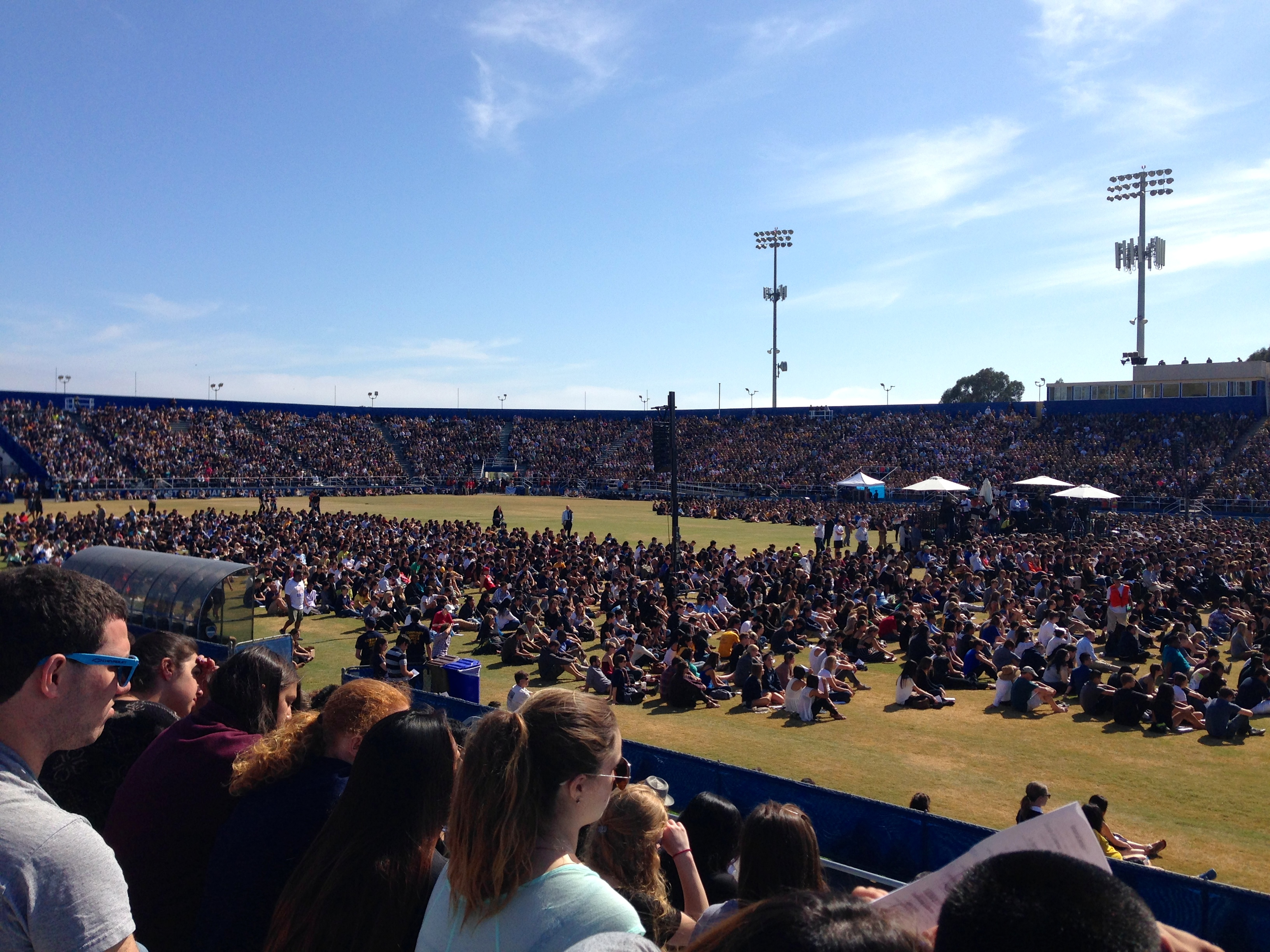
Memorial service at Harder Stadium, May 27

On May 24, 2014, at Anisq'Oyo Park in Isla Vista, over 4,000 students and the wider community attended a candlelight gathering to remember the victims. Three days later, on May 27, UCSB canceled classes and held a "day of mourning and reflection" at the university's Harder Stadium. More than 20,000 people attended the memorial, where Michaels-Martinez's father read statements from the families of Hong and Wang. He also spoke about his son and repeatedly yelled "not one more" to the crowd. On May 29, over 2,000 people gathered for a paddle-out memorial, where students chanted, sang, and threw flowers into the ocean.

== Reactions ==
=== On social media ===
Following the killings carried out by Elliot Rodger, some individuals on social media and in the comments on his YouTube videos expressed sympathy for his stated grievances, with a small minority suggesting that his perceived rejection by women justified violence. Others commented on his appearance and speculated about his difficulty forming relationships, while some attributed his actions to mental health issues and unrealistic expectations regarding women initiating romantic interest. A Facebook page titled “Elliot Rodger Is an American Hero” was later created, sharing his “Retribution” video and hosting commentary supportive of his actions; activists reported the page for hate speech and incitement to violence and organized a campaign urging Facebook to remove it. Although Facebook initially stated that the page did not violate its standards, it and several similar pages were subsequently removed under the platform’s Statement of Rights and Responsibilities.

After Rodger’s attacks, which authorities and commentators characterized as motivated by misogyny, some Twitter users used the hashtag #NotAllMen to emphasize that most men do not share such views or engage in similar violence. Other users argued that the attacks should not be viewed primarily as misogynistic because Rodger killed more men than women, or contended that mental illness and gaps in U.S. gun control laws were more significant contributing factors. The hashtag drew criticism for shifting attention away from broader concerns about violence and discrimination against women. In response, the hashtag #YesAllWomen was used approximately 1.2 million times on Twitter, surpassing earlier hashtags that highlighted sexism and violence against women.

=== Idolization ===
Rodger’s crimes brought increased public attention to the online “incel” (involuntary celibate) subculture, within which some members have portrayed him in explicitly celebratory terms. Posts in these communities have included tribute songs, merchandise featuring his image, and memes depicting him in quasi-religious imagery. Some users refer to him as a “saint” or “hero” and mark the anniversary of the killings as “Saint Elliot Day.” Within these forums, his name was often abbreviated as “E.R.” and his attacks have been cited as an inspiration by individuals involved in or suspected of other acts of mass violence, sometimes described as “going E.R.”

On October 1, 2015, Chris Harper-Mercer killed nine people and injured eight others at Umpqua Community College before taking his own life. Prior to the attack, Harper-Mercer referenced Rodger alongside other mass killers in a manifesto, describing them as "people who are elite, people who stand with the gods". On April 23, 2018, Alek Minassian killed 11 people and injured 15 others in Toronto by driving a van into pedestrians. Before the attack, Minassian posted a message on Facebook referencing an "Incel Rebellion" and praising Rodger using language common in online incel forums.

=== In other media ===
==== Controversy over publication of Rodger's videos and manifesto ====
Several news networks limited the use of Rodger's "Retribution" video for fear of triggering copycat crimes. On May 24, 2014, YouTube took down Rodger's "Retribution" video, stating it broke the platform's rules by showing a threat of violence. Experts noted taking down the video would cause it to be increasingly shared across the internet. Genius co-founder Mahbod Moghadam resigned after receiving negative media attention by adding annotations on the website to Rodger's manifesto, calling Rodger's sister "smokin hot", and describing the document as "beautifully written". Genius CEO Tom Lehman said in a statement Moghadam's comments "went beyond that into gleeful insensitivity and misogyny".

==== Misogyny ====
The attacks sparked discussion of broader issues of violence against women and misogyny. According to the International Centre for Counter-Terrorism at the Hague, Rodger's attacks were an act of misogynist terrorism. The US Secret Service described it as "misogynistic extremism". Writer M.E. Williams objected to Rodger being labeled the "virgin killer", saying that implies "one possible cause of male aggression is a lack of female sexual acquiescence". Amanda Hess, writing for Slate, said although Rodger killed more men than women, his motivations were misogynistic because his reason for hating the men he attacked was that he thought they stole the women he felt entitled to. Writing for Reason, Cathy Young wrote that it seemed like a "good example of stretching the concept into meaninglessness – or turning it into unfalsifiable quasi-religious dogma", and that Rodger also wrote hateful messages about other men.

Film critic Ann Hornaday of The Washington Post attributed the attacks to Hollywood's "sexist movie monoculture", which she said is largely produced by white men. Hornaday criticized the Canadian actor Seth Rogen and the American director Judd Apatow, stating Rogen's role in the 2014 film Neighbors and Apatow's directing encourage "outsized frat-boy fantasies", making people like Rodger feel "unjustly shut out of college life that should be full of 'sex and fun and pleasure'". On Twitter, Rogen called her criticisms "horribly insulting and misinformed".

=== Gun control and mental health ===
President Barack Obama talking about the killings to then-Tumblr CEO David Karp

The attacks renewed calls for gun control and improvements in the American healthcare system. Sheriff Bill Brown said Rodger's actions and copycat attacks were due to shortcomings in the mental-health treatment system, noted a widespread shortfall in resources for community mental health care, and criticized inadequate communication from healthcare professionals regarding people who suffer from suicidal or homicidal thoughts. Several legislators in California demanded an evaluation of the interaction between the deputies and Rodger on April 30, 2014. The Federal Bureau of Investigation (FBI) launched an investigation on the Sheriff's Office's handling of the situation. The deputies did not consult the California gun ownership database, which showed Rodger had purchased at least two handguns. They also did not examine the YouTube videos that led Rodger's parents to contact them. Subsequently, the Sheriff's Office concluded the responding deputies followed all rules and conducted themselves professionally in accordance with both state law and departmental guidelines.

In a June 2014 livestream with David Karp regarding the shootings, President Barack Obama expressed for stronger gun-control and expressed frustration that Congress had not taken action. He also criticized the political influence of gun-rights organizations, including the National Rifle Association (NRA), and said that public pressure would be necessary for Congress to make changes. Obama additionally extended his sympathies to Michaels-Martinez's father.

Despite California having one of the strictest gun laws in the United States, Rodger, despite having undergone several years of psychiatric treatment, passed all necessary background checks. Because he had neither been institutionalized for mental health issues nor had a criminal history, he was able to purchase three firearms. In California, at the time, undergoing mental health treatment did not disqualify people for applying for firearms. When the mental health hotline informed the police of Rodger's threats on YouTube, the absence of an immediate threat meant the police lacked the authority to search his apartment, search the gun registry, or confiscate any firearms without a warrant based on probable cause.

Democratic Senator Richard Blumenthal from Connecticut advocated for the reinstatement of gun-control measures previously declined by Congress following the 2012 Sandy Hook school shooting, saying such legislation might have prevented Rodger's shooting spree. Blumenthal noted the necessity of refocusing gun-control initiatives around mental health issues, and the urgent need for enhanced resources to support people with mental illnesses. In his address, Michaels-Martinez's father attributed the attacks to the "craven, irresponsible" actions of politicians and the NRA, accusing the NRA of prioritizing gun rights above public safety. Subsequently, Martinez said he wanted members of Congress to stop calling him to offer condolences for his son's death and appealed to the public to unite with him in "demanding immediate action" on gun control from Congress members. He extended his sympathies toward Rodger's parents.

Timothy F. Murphy, a Pennsylvania Representative and clinical psychologist, presented his bipartisan mental-health reform as a solution and called on Congress to enact it. Santa Barbara Assembly members Das Williams and Nancy Skinner introduced legislation that would allow law enforcement, close relatives, or roommates to request a court order for the confiscation of firearms from individuals deemed a serious risk to themselves or others. State Senator Hannah-Beth Jackson also proposed a bill enforcing officers to consult a state firearms registry during assessments of potential threats to personal or public safety. Jackson's bill received unanimous Senate approval in August 2014. Williams' and Skinner's bill passed through both legislative chambers but was opposed by the NRA and other groups advocating for Second Amendment rights, and launched statewide robocall campaigns against it. Williams noted the external origin of the calls and maintained the legislation had received significant bipartisan support. Governor Jerry Brown ultimately signed both bills into law in September 2014, making California the first state to enact a red flag law that allows family members to petition courts to remove weapons from persons deemed a threat.

== Lawsuits ==
In March 2015, the parents of Hong, Wang, and Chen filed a wrongful death lawsuit in federal court against Santa Barbara County, the Sheriff's department, Capri Apartments, and the property management company, claiming negligence and breaches of the victims' constitutional right to due process. They alleged since Rodger moved into the Capri Apartments in 2011, he insulted and fought with a lot of his roommates and displayed odd behavior, but the apartment owners failed to conduct reasonable background checks before assigning Hong and Wang as his roommates, and failed to warn them Rodger had had serious conflicts with his previous roommates. They also alleged the county and its Sheriff's Department violated their rights to due process by ignoring repeated "red flags" that indicated Rodger was violent and unstable, even after a mental health worker saw Rodger's YouTube videos and contacted authorities to report Rodger appeared to be a danger to himself and others. By June 2015, the lawsuit was in early stages of litigation, with the defendants denying any wrongdoing.

On October 28, 2015, U.S. District Judge John F. Walter removed Santa Barbara County and the Sheriff's department from the lawsuit, determining the county had not infringed upon the plaintiffs' constitutional rights under federal law and that the Sheriff's department did not act neglectfully, nor did their procedures and guidelines contribute to the harm they suffered. The judge concluded the victims' parents failed to sufficiently demonstrate a violation of their due-process rights, and although the judge dismissed the state-law claims within the lawsuits in federal court, he allowed the claims to be re-submitted. The victims' parents proceeded to re-file their claims on November 20, 2015, in state court. Capri Apartments and the property management company sought to have the lawsuit dismissed but their motion was denied on February 10, 2017. By May 2017, a trial date was scheduled for September 15 the same year. The lawsuit was settled nearly a week and a half before the trial was due to start. Despite the property management company's denial of a settlement, an attorney for the victim's parents said a confidential settlement had been reached; according to the Santa Barbara Independent, the settlement was for $20 million.

In March 2015, a man shot multiple times by Rodger filed a lawsuit against the Sheriff's Department, Santa Barbara County, and the University of California Board of Regents, alleging violations of his 14th Amendment rights. The man's complaint focused on Rodger's April 30 welfare check. He alleged that the police failed to investigate Rodger's previous contacts with law enforcement, conduct a firearm registry or background check, review his videos and posts, interview his therapists or counselors, or obtain a mental-health evaluation for Rodger. The man argued that it allowed Rodger to have access to firearms and claimed the defendants were responsible for his injuries.

In June 2015, the parents of Cooper filed a wrongful death lawsuit against Santa Barbara County and UCSB, claiming that there were failures in mandatory responsibilities as well as negligent hiring and training of deputies. They claimed the welfare check performed on Rodger by sheriff's deputies on April 30 was inadequate because the deputies failed to review Rodger's YouTube videos or check the gun registry. They also highlighted several "red flags", including a report made by Rodger to campus police about someone damaging his car and his involvement in a fight at a party. In October 2015, Judge Colleen Sterne determined that the lawsuit did not meet the required legal standards to proceed but allowed them to submit a revised complaint by November 10 of that year. Cooper's parents' lawyer told Noozhawk they believed the judge's ruling was largely influenced by the legal safeguards that protect government entities from being sued for the choices made by police.

In June 2015, the cyclist who was struck by Rodger's vehicle and subsequently handcuffed filed a civil lawsuit against Santa Barbara County, the Sheriff's department, Rodger's parents, and UCSB, citing negligence, false imprisonment, and civil rights infringements for being handcuffed and not given immediate medical attention after the collision. The lawsuit alleged both campus police and the Santa Barbara Sheriff's Department did not adequately investigate Rodger despite his release of several YouTube videos indicating his potential threat to others. Additionally, it alleged Rodger's parents were negligent in allowing their mentally unstable son access to a vehicle. By February 2016, the lawsuit was transferred from Los Angeles County to the Santa Barbara County Superior Court, with the plaintiff pursuing damages exceeding over $25,000.

== Impact on media ==
In August 2015, a trailer for an independent indie horror film titled Del Playa was released on YouTube. Directed by Shaun Hart and produced by Josh Berger and Berger Bros. Entertainment, the film follows a college student who embarks on a killing spree after facing romantic rejection and bullying. Its title references Del Playa Drive, a street in Isla Vista, and the film includes footage shot in Isla Vista and UCSB.

Hours after the trailer's release, a UCSB student launched a Change.org petition demanding that its release be stopped, arguing that the movie too closely resembled Rodger and his attacks. The petition urged the producers to rename the film and donate to a memorial fund set up for the victims, ultimately gathering over 20,000 signatures. In response, Hart issued a statement apologizing to those offended and clarifying that the film was not inspired by Rodger, but intended to focus on the issues of bullying.

Originally slated for release in October 2015, because Del Playa faced significant backlash, Hart decided to push the film back. In December 2016, he announced that the film would come out in 2017, commenting that many Isla Vista residents had since "graduated and moved on with their lives". Hart insisted he never intended to offend anyone, describing the film as "art" that was pushed into "boundaries, inciting societal and emotional revelation". He said writing the movie was his way of processing the attacks and coming to terms with them. He predicted Del Playa would be moderate success and promised to donate a portion of its proceeds to charity. The film was ultimately released to streaming platforms on July 21, 2017.

=== Depiction in popular culture ===
- "Holden's Manifesto", an episode of Law & Order: Special Victims Unit, is based on this event.
- The 2023 science fiction film The Beast features a character, played by George MacKay, inspired by Rodger. The film contains re-creations of Rodger's YouTube videos.
- Rodger was mentioned several times in the Criminal Minds episode "Alpha Male".
- Chanel Miller recounts her experience as a student at UCSB during the event in her 2019 memoir Know My Name.

== See also ==
- List of school shootings in the United States by death toll
- List of homicides in California
- List of mass shootings in the United States
- List of rampage killers in the United States
