= The 33 Strategies of War =

2006 book by Robert Greene

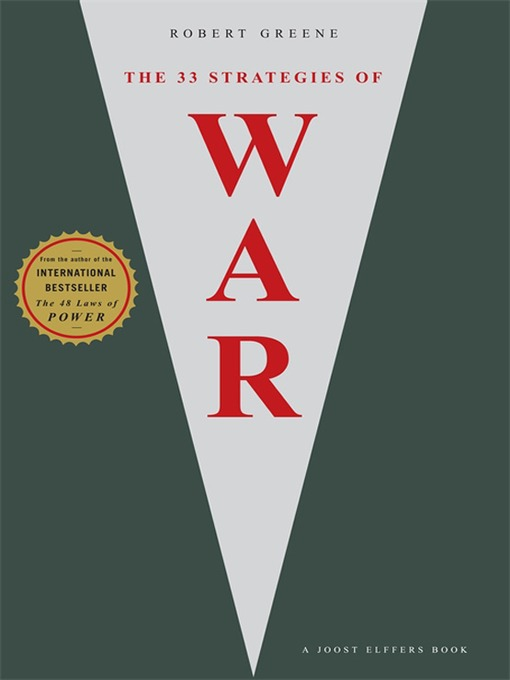
- Author: Robert Greene
- Language: English
- Genre: Business, management, military history, psychology, self-improvement
- Publisher: Penguin Group (HC); HighBridge Audio (CD)
- Publication date: January and April 2006
- Publication place: United States
- Media type: Print (hardcover) and CD
- Pages: 496
- ISBN: 0-670-03457-6 (HC); 978-1-59887-091-6 (CD)
- Preceded by: The Art of Seduction
- Followed by: The 50th Law

The 33 Strategies of War is a personal development and self-help book. It was written by American author Robert Greene in 2006. It is composed of discussions and examples of offensive and defensive strategies from a wide variety of people and conditions, applying them to social conflicts such as family quarrels and business negotiations.

== Reception ==
The Independent said Greene has set himself up as a "highly successful author" of "tracts on how to get ahead", but that "it is never clear whether he really believes what he writes or whether it is just his shtick, an instrument of his will to shift £20 hardbacks" and concludes "There is something less than adult about it all." Admiral James G. Stavridis said the book had good breadth, but it lacked depth. Leadership theorist and author John Adair said Greene "shows a poor grasp of the subject" and the book is based on the flawed "assumption that the art of military strategy and the art of living are comparable". Booklist said the book was repetitive, lacked a sense of humor, and had an annoying "quasi-spiritual tone". NBA player Chris Bosh stated that his favorite book is The 33 Strategies of War. The book has been banned by several US prisons.

In 2023, al-Qaeda's de facto emir Saif al-Adel self-published an interpretation of the book titled Free Reading of 33 Strategies of War.

The book was described by one reviewer as having "far too many duff sentences", such: "Your goal is to blend philosophy and war, wisdom and battle, into an unbeatable blend." It has sold more than 200,000 copies.

== See also ==
- The 48 Laws of Power
- On War
- The Art of War
- The Book of Five Rings
- Thirty-Six Stratagems
