= Mastery (book) =

Book by Robert Greene

- Hardcover edition
- Author: Robert Greene
- Language: English
- Subject: Strategy, self-help, philosophy
- Genre: Non-fiction
- Publisher: Viking Adult
- Publication date: November 13, 2012
- Publication place: United States
- Pages: 353
- Preceded by: The 50th Law
- Followed by: The Laws of Human Nature

Mastery is the fifth book by the American author Robert Greene. The book examines the lives of historical figures such as Charles Darwin and Henry Ford, as well as the lives of contemporary leaders such as Paul Graham, Temple Grandin, Teresita Fernández, Yoky Matsuoka and Freddie Roach, and examines what led to their success. The book was published on November 13, 2012 by Viking Adult.

== Origins ==
The book originated from a realization that Greene reached while writing and researching his previous books; Greene concluded that the people he studied had similar paths to success. After finishing The 50th Law, Greene focused on this concept in writing Mastery.

== Synopsis ==
Mastery explains how to become successful by examining the lives of historical figures such as Wolfgang Amadeus Mozart and Albert Einstein, as well as through Greene's interviews with contemporary figures such as Teresita Fernández, Cesar Rodriguez, and Daniel Everett.

== Reception ==
Mastery reached #6 on The New York Times Bestseller list and was featured in The New York Times, CNN Money, The Huffington Post, Business Insider, Forbes, Management Today, and Fast Company.
