= The 50th Law =

2009 book by Robert Greene and 50 Cent

- Paperback edition
- Author: Robert Greene, 50 Cent
- Language: English
- Subject: Strategy, self-help, philosophy
- Genre: Non-fiction
- Published: September 8, 2009
- Publisher: Harper Studio
- Publication place: United States
- Media type: Print
- Preceded by: The 33 Strategies of War
- Followed by: Mastery

The 50th Law is a New York Times bestselling book on strategy and fearlessness written collaboratively by rapper 50 Cent and author Robert Greene. The book is a semi-autobiographical account detailing 50 Cent's rise as both a young urban hustler and as an up-and-coming musician with lessons and anecdotes from historical figures such as Abraham Lincoln, Sun Tzu, Socrates, Napoleon, Malcolm X, and James Baldwin.

== Origins ==
The 50th Law grew out of the friendship and mutual admiration between 50 Cent and Robert Greene. Greene's book The 48 Laws of Power, which has long been a staple in the hip hop world, came to the attention of 50 Cent, who asked his manager to arrange a meeting. Greene said that he was surprised by 50 Cent's persona and was impressed by his "Zen-like calmness" and eye for strategy. The two began to work on a book project that would combine their two worlds.

According to Greene, 50 Cent embodies the characteristics of what Machiavelli noticed in strong leaders. According to 50 Cent, Greene's books describe the laws and strategies used by hustlers on the street, even if they might not know the "technical terms" for what they were doing.

== Synopsis ==
Each of the 10 chapters in the book explains a factor of fearlessness and begins by telling how 50 Cent learned this Fearless Philosophy in Southside Queens. The 50th Law illustrates the laws of the book by supplementing anecdotes from 50 Cent's life with historical examples from Malcolm X, Miles Davis, Sun Tzu, François de La Rochefoucauld, Machiavelli, Richard Wright, James Baldwin, Thucydides, Dostoyevsky, Charlie Parker, and the Baron de Montesquieu.

== Reception ==
The book debuted at #5 on The New York Times Bestseller list and was a USA Today bestseller. The New York Post called The 50th Law "a modern day Art of War," The Guardian referred to the book as "a manual on power similar to the works of Machiavelli and Sun Tzu," and Library Journal noted that The 50th Law is written for "anyone interested in how to succeed in business and the game of life."

The book was also mentioned in The New York Times, MSNBC, The New York Daily News, Forbes, Business Insider, Fast Company, The Daily Telegraph, Vibe and Billboard. In promotion of the book, Greene and 50 Cent appeared on The Today Show, CNBC, ABC, BBC and MTV News. The 50th Law was also published as a 60-page comic book.
