= The Art of Seduction =

Self-help book by Robert Greene

- Author: Robert Greene
- Language: English
- Subject: Strategy, self-help, philosophy
- Genre: Non-fiction
- Publisher: Profile Books
- Publication date: 2001
- Pages: 468
- ISBN: 1861977697
- Preceded by: The 48 Laws of Power
- Followed by: The 33 Strategies of War

The Art of Seduction (2001) is the second book by American author Robert Greene. The book examines various seduction strategies that humans have employed, and was an international bestseller.

== Synopsis ==
The book profiles nine types of seducers (with an additional profile for an "anti-seducer" as well) and eighteen types of victims. Greene uses examples from historical figures such as Cleopatra, Giacomo Casanova, Søren Kierkegaard, Duke Ellington and John F. Kennedy to support the psychology behind seduction. The book contains 24 seduction techniques. Greene saw The Art of Seduction as the logical follow-up to The 48 Laws of Power since seduction is "about power and manipulation as much as it is about romance, about how to make someone fall under your spell."

== The 9 types of seducers ==
=== The Siren ===
The siren is the person who represents adventure and change. They develop their persona and charm on the premise that their partner is always looking for a variety of experiences and they present those experiences to their partner. The Siren’s charm lies in an almost theatrical and sensually pleasing visual experience which they create through elaborate attire and an air of seduction. The Siren harnesses feminine energy, is often coy, glamorous, regal, and gravitates toward a life of leisure and comfort. They have an instant effect on their partner due to their inherent sex appeal which lies in their calm, unhurried demeanor and dazzling appearance. Sirens have an almost dangerous quality. They make their partners pursue them and tend to stay slightly out of reach. Greene uses Cleopatra and Marilyn Monroe as his main examples.

Symbol: Water. The song of the Siren is liquid and enticing, and the Siren herself is fluid and ungraspable. Like the sea, the Siren lures you with the promise of infinite adventure and pleasure. Forgetting past and future, men follow her far out to sea, where they drown.

=== The Rake ===
The Rake is a seducer who catches their target's fancy by incessantly pursuing her. Just like the siren has an effect on men due to her physical presence, a rake has an effect on women due to his ability to show an ardent devotion to her. She is attracted to him because he seems to be madly in love with her. He shows no hesitation or reluctance, and unabashedly admits his weakness when in her presence, hence making every woman's dream come true. He is an expert at using words and language to show his devotion. Like the Siren, the Rake also keeps a part of his personality hidden, creating a sense of danger and thrill. He also has a reputation for being a ladies man and being reckless in love, but he never downplays or hides his notoriety. Instead he uses it to his advantage to generate interest among women. Greene uses Fronsac, the Duke of Richelieu and Gabriele D'Annunzio as examples of Rakes.

Symbol: Fire. The Rake burns with a desire that inflames the woman he is seducing. It is extreme, uncontrollable, and dangerous. The Rake may end in hell, but the flames surrounding him often make him seem that much more desirable to women.

=== The Ideal Lover ===
The ideal lover, as the name suggests, represents a fantasy lover who makes the beloved feel lofty and great. Greene uses the examples of Casanova and Madame de Pompadour to describe an ideal lover. According to Greene, Casanova is historically considered the most successful seducer. He made himself irresistible to women by giving them what seemed missing in their lives. He used careful observation to determine a woman's needs and presented himself as the epitome of what she desired. Madame de Pompadour employed the same strategy with King Louis XV who needed a change and adventure in his life. Madame de Pompadour became the adventure he so desired. Through her costumes, innovative activities and projects she won his heart and gained great power.

Symbol: The Portrait Painter. Under his eye, all of your physical imperfections disappear. He brings out noble qualities in you, frames you in a myth, makes you godlike, immortalizes you. For his ability to create such fantasies, he is rewarded with great power.

=== The Dandy ===
A dandy is the kind of seducer who offers the kind of forbidden freedom that most people can only dream of but never hope to achieve. A dandy is essentially a radical who doesn't conform to tradition and often rely on insolence to attract the opposite sex. Dandies can be both male and female. A male dandy is not an aggressive male seducer but rather a sophisticated and graceful one. Where a male dandy dresses with an almost feminine appeal and attention to detail, a woman dandy has masculine qualities in her appearance and attire. Greene uses examples of Rudolph Valentino, Marlene Dietrich, Prince Rogers Nelson and Lou von Salomé as prototypical examples of male and female dandies. Rudolph Valentino was a male dancer and film actor who had graceful body movements, a trim body and beautiful clean cut facial features. He had a masculine persona but he wore jewelry and tight fitted clothes to create an aura of sophistication. He also played up his physicality in his movies with scenes of stripping and undressing. Female dandies Marlene Dietrich and Lou von Salome were both non-conformists in their attire and attitude. Marlene dressed up like a man while Salome was domineering and calculating. All these historical figures seduced large number of people due to their ability to break conventions and represent an almost forbidden freedom.

Symbol: The Orchid. Its shape and color suggest both sexes, its odor is sweet and decadent—it is a tropical flower of evil.

=== The Natural ===
Many people consider childhood as the golden age, by that acquiring a sense of having lost that time of thoughtless memory allowing all the more precious and desired moreover self remain. The Natural seducer is the one who has somehow retained the childhood traits. They have an innocent quality about them which makes them irresistible. Like a child they are impish, vulnerable and defenseless, open and spontaneous. They make their audience lower their guards because they appear so guileless and fresh. People are attracted to them because they represent a refreshing experience in contrast to the daily seriousness of adult life. Though the Naturals present a child-like quality, they also bring the wisdom of adulthood and combine these two together to create an irresistible charm. Greene uses Charlie Chaplin's example to personify the idea of a Natural.

Greene uses the lamb as the symbol of the Natural, emphasizing its playfulness, vulnerability, and innocence as qualities that contribute to its appeal.

=== The Coquette ===
The Coquette is the kind of seducer who leads a person on without offering instant gratification. Their modus operandi is to delay satisfaction alternating between unexplained warmth and coldness so that the victim stays in a state of anticipation not knowing what is coming next. They play on human psychology knowing that anything that is easily available to humans is not necessarily valued. Hence, they create a persona of being unavailable and this generates excitement in their audience. Coquettes are somewhat narcissistic as well and have no qualms in making their victims pursue them relentlessly. They create a sense of insecurity in their targets and when they reach the brink, they reel them back in with a show of warmth and attention. They play within them imparticular set emotions swinging between love and hate. Greene uses Empress Joséphine Bonaparte and Andy Warhol as examples.

Symbol: The Shadow. It cannot be grasped. Chase your shadow and it will flee; turn your back on it and it will follow you. It is also a person's dark side, the thing that makes them mysterious. After they have given us pleasure, the shadow of their withdrawal makes us yearn for their return, much as clouds make us yearn for the sun.

=== The Charmer ===
Charmers are those who seduce by making their targets the center of attention. They don't highlight their own selves, but rather their entire focus is on bringing comfort and pleasure to their targets. They avoid all sorts of conflict and appeal to a person's vanity by making them talk about themselves. They watch and observe allowing their targets to open up completely. Once they know their weaknesses, they use that information to give them what they want. This allows them to have a complete hold on their targets. Greene gives the example of Benjamin Disraeli and Queen Victoria's relationship. Disraeli knew that Queen Victoria longed for a man's attention and used this insight to gain her confidence and proximity in court.

Symbol: The Mirror. Your spirit holds a mirror up to others. When they see you they see themselves: their values, their tastes, even their flaws. Their lifelong love affair with their own image is comfortable and hypnotic; so feed it. No one ever sees what is behind the mirror.

=== The Charismatic ===
Charismatic seducers are inherently exciting because they come across as self sufficient and self driven. They represent the kind of personality that most people want to see themselves as. They might be great orators, public figures, visionaries or leaders. People might look towards them to alleviate their sufferings or to save them. They use their powerful personalities and their way with words to sway emotions and to stir up change. Some charismatic figures are able to seduce by creating contradictions within their personalities e.g. cruelty and kindness, power and vulnerability, etc. Greene uses Eva Perón, Elvis Presley, Joan of Arc, Grigori Rasputin, Malcolm X, Charles de Gaulle, and Jiddu Krishnamurti as examples.

Symbol: The Lamp. Invisible to the eye, a current flowing through a wire in a glass vessel generates a heat that turns into the glow of incandescence, which is all we see. In the prevailing darkness, the Lamp lights the way.

=== The Star ===
The Star has a glamorous and dramatic presence and they present themselves as objects of fascination. Kennedy, for instance, was a star who won over his opponents through his star quality and eloquence. Stars seduce the subconscious mind by appealing to human fascination with the strange and the mythical. They create a larger than life persona and then contrast it with playing up human qualities which make them amenable to the targets. People are attracted towards the Star because they are fascinated by them and can relate to them at the same time.

Symbol: The Idol. A piece of stone carved into the shape of a god, perhaps glittering with gold and jewels. The eyes of the worshippers fill the stone with life, imagining it to have real powers. Its shape allows them to see what they want to see—a god—but it is actually just a piece of stone. The god lives in their imaginations.

== Reception ==
It is mentioned in Neil Strauss's book The Game: Penetrating the Secret Society of Pickup Artists as a recommended book in the seduction community. American Apparel founder and CEO Dov Charney found the book to be a fascinating study in human behavior. The Art of Seduction and Greene have been featured in The Los Angeles Times, The New York Times, Newsweek, The New Yorker, New York Magazine, The New York Post, Esquire, and Wired.

Greene considers himself a Reformed Rake, one of the types of seducers mentioned in the book, and states that he used the book's techniques to attract his wife, Anna Biller. He is working to develop a television series based on the book.
