= The 48 Laws of Power =

1998 non-fiction New York Times bestseller book by Robert Greene

- Author: Robert Greene
- Subject: Self-help
- Published: 1998 (Viking Press) (HC); 2007 (HighBridge Audio) CD
- Publication place: United States
- Pages: 452
- ISBN: 0670881465 (HC); ISBN 978-1598870923 (CD)
- OCLC: 39733201
- Dewey Decimal: 303.3 21
- LC Class: BD438 .G74 1998
- Followed by: The Art of Seduction

The 48 Laws of Power (1999) is a self-help book by American author Robert Greene. The book is a New York Times bestseller, selling over 1.2 million copies in the United States.

== Background ==
Greene initially formulated some of the ideas in The 48 Laws of Power while working as a writer in Hollywood and concluding that today's power elite shared similar traits with powerful figures throughout history. In 1995, Greene worked as a writer at Fabrica, an art and media school, and met a book packager named Joost Elffers. Greene pitched a book about power to Elffers and six months later, Elffers requested that Greene write a treatment.

Although Greene was quite unhappy in his job, he was comfortable and thought that writing a proper book proposal was too risky in his situation. However, at the time Greene was rereading his favorite biography about Julius Caesar and took inspiration from Caesar's decision to cross the Rubicon River and fight Pompey, thus inciting Caesar's civil war. Greene wrote the treatment, which would later become The 48 Laws of Power. He would note this as the turning point of his life.

== Reception ==
=== Popularity ===
The 48 Laws of Power has sold over 1.2 million copies in the United States and has been translated into 24 languages. Fast Company called the book a "mega cult classic", and the Los Angeles Times noted that The 48 Laws of Power turned Greene into a "cult hero with the hip-hop set, Hollywood elite and prison inmates alike".

The book has been reported to be much requested in American prison libraries. Rapper 50 Cent stated that he related to the book "immediately", and approached Greene with the prospect of a potential collaboration, which would later become The 50th Law, another New York Times bestseller. Busta Rhymes and Derrius Jackson used The 48 Laws of Power to deal with problematic movie producers. The 48 Laws of Power has also been mentioned in songs by UGK, Jay-Z (Primetime), Kanye West, Central Cee, MF Doom, and Drake. Dov Charney, founder and former CEO of American Apparel who would be terminated by that company in 2014, frequently quoted the laws during board meetings, has given friends and employees copies of the book, and appointed Greene to the board of the now defunct American Apparel. Greene claimed that Cuban President Fidel Castro has also read the book. The book has been banned by several US prisons.

The 48 Laws of Power has been referenced or bought by 50 Cent, Jay-Z, Busta Rhymes, Michael Jackson (who wrote in the margins), Courtney Love (who was photographed carrying it on the way to court when facing a drug charge) and Will Smith. The 48 Laws of Power has also had a major influence on various music producers, such as DJ Premier and Calvin Harris, both of whom have tattoos inspired by Robert Greene’s book.

In response to the popular reputation of his work as an unethical book, Greene himself responded by saying that he "could count maybe four or five laws that are overtly manipulative" and there are "44 others that are not manipulative at all". He then continues by saying that people cherry pick the "chapters that are most egregious".

Greene has also stated that he takes most of his own laws "with a healthy pinch of salt," saying, "When I say 'Crush your enemy,' I don’t literally mean it. […] I’m talking about the way large companies deal with each other, for example in technology it’s a dog-eat-dog environment. These laws are not for Joe Schmo who’s got a colleague he doesn’t like."

=== Reviews by critics and scholars ===
People's Magazine referred to it as "a wry primer for people who desperately want to be on top." Allure described the book as “satisfyingly dense", and "literary", and continued that it is filled "with fantastic examples of genius power-game players." Quincy Jones III, reviewing the book, states that he views Greene's work as "more as an empowerment tool than as a way to screw people." Jerry Adler, writing in Newsweek, lists ways the laws contradict one another and states, "Intending the opposite, Greene has actually produced one of the best arguments since the New Testament for humility and obscurity." Kirkus Reviews said Greene offers no evidence to support his world view, that his laws contradict each other, and that the book is "simply nonsense". Craig Pinder has stated that the book "has practical tips for the use of power" and that while they may seem deceptive, "actually have reasonable explanations".

The 48 Laws of Power has been studied at Millsaps College and Ramapo College. Jeffrey Pfeffer of Stanford University said that Greene's laws are based on isolated examples, and not on solid research.

== See also ==
- The Art of War
- Thirty-Six Stratagems
- The Laws of Human Nature
