= Robert Greene (American author) =

American author (born 1959)

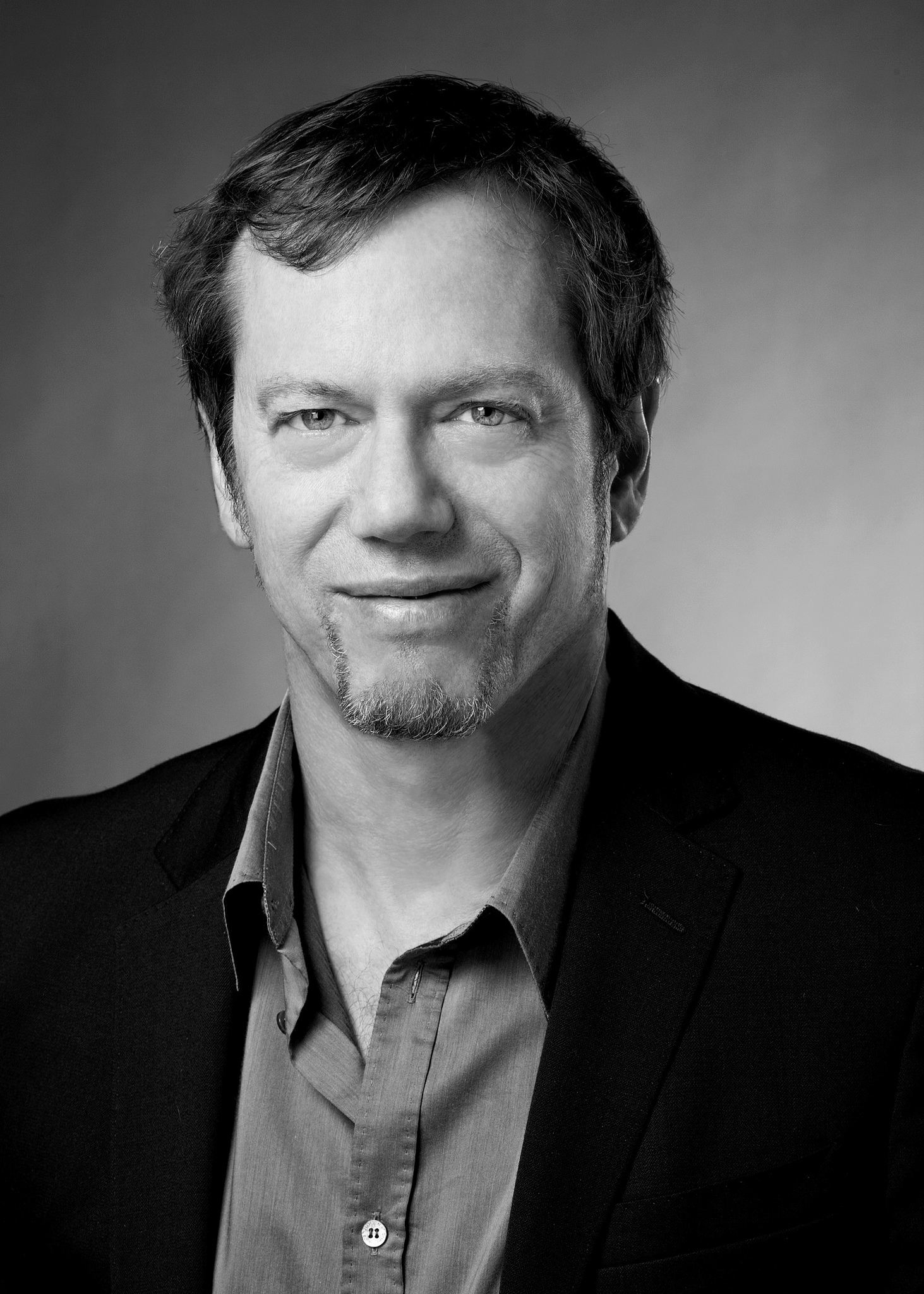
- Born: May 14, 1959 (age 67); Los Angeles, California, U.S.
- Education: University of Wisconsin-Madison
- Occupation: Author
- Spouse: Anna Biller
- Writing career
- Notable works: The 48 Laws of Power (1998); The Art of Seduction (2001); The 33 Strategies of War (2006)

Robert Greene (born May 14, 1959) is an American author of books on strategy, power, and seduction. He has written seven international bestsellers, including The 48 Laws of Power, The Art of Seduction, The 33 Strategies of War, The 50th Law (with rapper 50 Cent), Mastery, The Laws of Human Nature, and The Daily Laws. His eighth book, The Law of the Sublime, was published in November 2026.

Born in 1959, Greene studied classical studies and worked a variety of jobs, before his first book was published in 1998. Greene frequently draws on analyses of past historical figures and events throughout his writing. Greene's works have been referenced by a wide variety of celebrities, political figures, and civil rights activists. He is the most banned author in prisons in the United States; many prisons ban his books as a security measure.

== Early life and career ==
The younger son of Jewish parents, Greene grew up in Baldwin Hills and Brentwood neighbourhoods of Los Angeles, graduated from Palisades Charter High School, and attended the University of California, Berkeley, before finishing his degree at the University of Wisconsin–Madison with a B.A. degree in classical studies. Prior to becoming an author, Greene estimates that he worked about 50 jobs, including as a construction worker, translator, magazine editor, and Hollywood movie writer. In 1995, Greene worked as a writer at Fabrica, an art and media school in Italy, and met a book packager named Joost Elffers. Greene pitched a book about power to Elffers and wrote a treatment which eventually became The 48 Laws of Power. He would note this as the turning point of his life.

Greene was an editor at Esquire. He was approached in 2001 and subsequently hired as a consultant by Dov Charney, the founding CEO of American Apparel, who had read his book The 48 Laws of Power. After advising Charney on the company's initial public offering in 2007, Greene joined its board of directors and was described as the "in-house guru".

== Books ==
Cover art for The 48 Laws of Power

Greene has written seven published books.

=== The 48 Laws of Power ===
Greene's first book, The 48 Laws of Power, first published in 1998, presents itself as a guide for anyone who wants power, observes power, or wants to arm themselves against power. The book features quotations from the works of historical figures like Niccolò Machiavelli, Sun Tzu, Haile Selassie I, Carl von Clausewitz, Queen Elizabeth I, Henry Kissinger, and P.T. Barnum. Each law has its own chapter, complete with a "transgression of the law," "observance of the law," and/or a "reversal."

Greene says the idea behind his first book is that power is amoral, i.e., it is neither good nor evil. He states The 48 Laws of Power is intended to highlight how we conceptualize power and how we behave in different hierarchical institutions.

The 48 Laws of Power has sold more than 1.2 million copies and has been referenced by 50 Cent, Jay-Z, Quincy “QD3" Jones III, Chris Lighty, Lyor Cohen, Kevin Liles, Michael Jackson, Courtney Love, and Will Smith. Busta Rhymes says he used The 48 Laws of Power to deal with problematic movie producers. It has been mentioned in songs by Jay-Z, Kanye West, and Drake and in videos by The Kid LAROI and Central Cee. Greene has claimed that former Cuban President Fidel Castro had also read the book.

The Sunday Times noted that The 48 Laws of Power has become the "Hollywood back-stabber's bible" and that although the book is reportedly used by some business executives, it is difficult to find people who publicly acknowledge its influence because of the book's controversial nature. Greene responds to this sentiment by stating, "These laws… people might say, 'Oh they're wicked', but they're practiced day in and day out by business people. You're always trying to get rid of your competition and it can be pretty bloodthirsty, and that's just the reality." Greene has also responded to accusations of his book being unethical by saying that he "could count maybe four or five laws that are overtly manipulative" and there are "44 others that are not manipulative at all". He then continues by saying that people cherry pick the "chapters that are most egregious". In December 2024, Spotify announced the book was the 6th top audiobook on their platform globally and the 5th top audiobook in the USA.

Greene has also stated that he takes most of his own laws "with a healthy pinch of salt," saying, "When I say 'Crush your enemy,' I don’t literally mean it. […] I’m talking about the way large companies deal with each other, for example in technology it’s a dog-eat-dog environment. These laws are not for Joe Schmo who’s got a colleague he doesn’t like."

In 2020, the rapper Drake stated he was producing a cinematic series on the book.

=== The Art of Seduction ===
Greene's second book, The Art of Seduction, was published in 2001. The book profiles nine types of seducers (e.g. The Rake, The Siren, and The Charmer) and details aspects of attraction, authenticity, storytelling, and negotiation. Greene uses examples from historical figures such as Cleopatra, Giacomo Casanova, Duke Ellington and John F. Kennedy to support the psychology behind seduction. It has sold more than 500,000 copies.

=== The 33 Strategies of War ===
The 33 Strategies of War is the third book by Greene and was published in 2006. The book is divided into five parts: Self-Directed Warfare, Organizational (Team) Warfare, Defensive Warfare, Offensive Warfare and Unconventional (Dirty) Warfare. The book is a guide to the campaign of everyday life and distills military wisdom from historical figures like Napoleon Bonaparte, Sun Tzu, Alfred Hitchcock, Alexander the Great and Margaret Thatcher.

The Sunday Times called the book "an excellent toolkit for dealing with business and relationships," and The Independent claims that Greene set himself up as a "highly successful author" of "tracts on how to get ahead" but that "it is never clear whether he really believes what he writes or whether it is just his shtick, an instrument of his will to shift £20 hardbacks." NBA player Chris Bosh stated that his favorite book is The 33 Strategies of War. It has sold more than 200,000 copies.

=== The 50th Law ===
The 50th Law is the fourth book by Greene—written collaboratively with rapper 50 Cent—and was published in 2009. The book mixes talk of strategy and fearlessness by supplementing anecdotes from 50 Cent's rise as both a hustler and as an up-and-coming musician with lessons from various historical figures. Each of the 10 chapters in the book explains a factor of fearlessness and begins by telling how 50 learned this "Fearless Philosophy" in Southside Queens.

The book debuted at #5 on The New York Times Bestseller list and was a USA Today bestseller.

=== Mastery ===
Greene's fifth book, Mastery, was released on November 13, 2012. Mastery examines the lives of both historical and contemporary figures such as Charles Darwin, Paul Graham, the Wright Brothers, Benjamin Franklin, Thomas Edison, and Mozart, and distills the traits and universal ingredients that made them masters. The book is divided into six sections, each focusing on essential lessons and strategies on the path to Mastery.

Mastery reached #6 on The New York Times Bestseller list and was featured in CNN Money, The Huffington Post, The New York Times, Business Insider, Forbes, Management Today, and Fast Company.

=== The Laws of Human Nature ===
Greene's sixth book, The Laws of Human Nature, was released in October 2018. Through 18 "laws", the book examines people's conscious and unconscious drives, motivations, and cognitive biases. It also talks about persuasion, rationality and death. He considers it his most complete book and advises for anyone who hasn't read anything from him to start from here.

The book takes examples from Joseph Stalin, Anton Chekhov, Lyndon Johnson, Leo Tolstoy, Coco Chanel, and others.

=== The Daily Laws ===
The Daily Laws, Greene's seventh book, was released in October 2021. The book features concise texts on wisdom, with each day of the year dedicated to a “Daily Law” and each month focusing on a different law.

=== The Law of the Sublime ===
The Law of the Sublime, published on November 10, 2026, by Viking, is Greene's eighth book. It explores experiences of awe, transcendence, and the search for meaning, drawing on science, history, mythology, nature, and the arts. The book includes exercises and meditations intended to help readers experience what Greene calls the "Sublime".

== Media ==
Greene's work has been featured in The New York Times, USA Today, CNN, The New Yorker, Newsweek, the Los Angeles Times, Forbes and the Huffington Post. Greene has also appeared on MSNBC, The Today Show, CNBC, ABC, and MTV News.

In 2013, Greene did a presentation on his book Mastery on Talks at Google. Later in the year, he did a presentation on TED titled "The key to transforming yourself". In 2016, a previous presentation of Robert's was uploaded at Microsoft Research titled "War, Power, Strategy". In 2019, he did another presentation on Talks at Google on his book The Laws of Human Nature.

== Personal life ==
Greene lives in Los Angeles with his partner Anna Biller, who is a filmmaker. Greene says he can speak five languages and is a student of Zen Buddhism.

Greene suffered what he described as "a serious stroke" before launching his new book The Laws of Human Nature in 2018. A blood clot in his neck caused the stroke, leaving Greene without the use of his left hand and leg for a period of time.

When asked in 2012 if he is religious, Greene said "I'm Jewish but I don't have a hardcore spiritual practice. I'm not hardcore atheist; I'm sort of how Einstein was: He wasn't a believer in the Jewish God. I'm intrigued by the sense that there's something there."

Greene has served as a mentor to Ryan Holiday, a bestselling author (e.g., of The Daily Stoic).

=== Politics ===
On December 16, 2022, during the Mahsa Amini protests, the Neighborhood Youth Alliance of Iran and the Neighborhood Youth of Karaj Group distributed a text that they attributed to Greene, describing strategies for opposing the Islamic Republic governmental system of Iran. The Institute for the Study of War suggested that the text corresponded to a December 7 YouTube video by Greene on the protests. A five-point list of civil disobedience strategies for sustaining the protest movement was distributed with the text.

In 2023, al-Qaeda's de facto emir Saif al-Adel self-published an interpretation of the book titled Free Reading of 33 Strategies of War.

Greene supported Barack Obama in the 2012 United States presidential election and identifies with liberal politics. He has spoken unfavourably of Obama's opponent Mitt Romney.

== Bibliography ==
- 1998 The 48 Laws of Power (with Joost Elffers)
- 2001 The Art of Seduction
- 2006 The 33 Strategies of War
- 2009 The 50th Law (with 50 Cent)
- 2012 Mastery
- 2018 The Laws of Human Nature
- 2021 The Daily Laws
- 2026 The Law of the Sublime
