= Sound of Hope (disambiguation) =

Sound of Hope is an international Chinese-language radio network established by practitioners of the Falun Gong new religious movement.

Sound of Hope may also refer to:

- The Sound of Hope, a 2020 book about music in the Holocaust by Kellie Brown
- Sound of Hope: The Story of Possum Trot, a 2024 drama film by Angel Studios

== See also ==
- SOH (disambiguation)
