= SOH =

SOH or soh may refer to:

== Facilities and structures ==
- Sydney Opera House, Sydney, New South Wales, Australia
- South Hampstead railway station of the National Rail in UK, station code SOH
- South Horizons station of the Hong Kong MTR, station code SOH

== Groups, organizations, companies ==
- Hispaniolan Ornithological Society (Spanish: Sociedad Ornitológica de la Hispaniola) of the Dominican Republic and Haiti
- Sound of Hope, international Chinese-language radio network established by practitioners of the Falun Gong new religious movement
- Southern Ohio Aviation (ICAO airline code: SOH), see List of airline codes (S)
- School of Health, University of Guam, Guam
- Southwest Senior High School, San Diego, California, USA

== Other uses ==
- Soh (surname), an alternative spelling of various Chinese, Japanese, and Korean surnames
- Sine = Opposite ÷ Hypotenuse, a mnemonic used to teach trigonometry
- Stable ocean hypothesis of ecology
- Start of Header (or Start of Heading: ^A), an ISO C0 control code
- State of health of batteries
- Sense of humour, the tendency of experiences to provoke laughter and provide amusement
- SOH-States of Humanity, a Gesamtkunstwerk created by multi media artist Alex Vermeulen
- Vanguard: Saga of Heroes, an MMORPG videogame

== See also ==
- SOHS (disambiguation)
