= Alex Vermeulen =

Dutch artist (born 1954)

SOH Alex Vermeulen
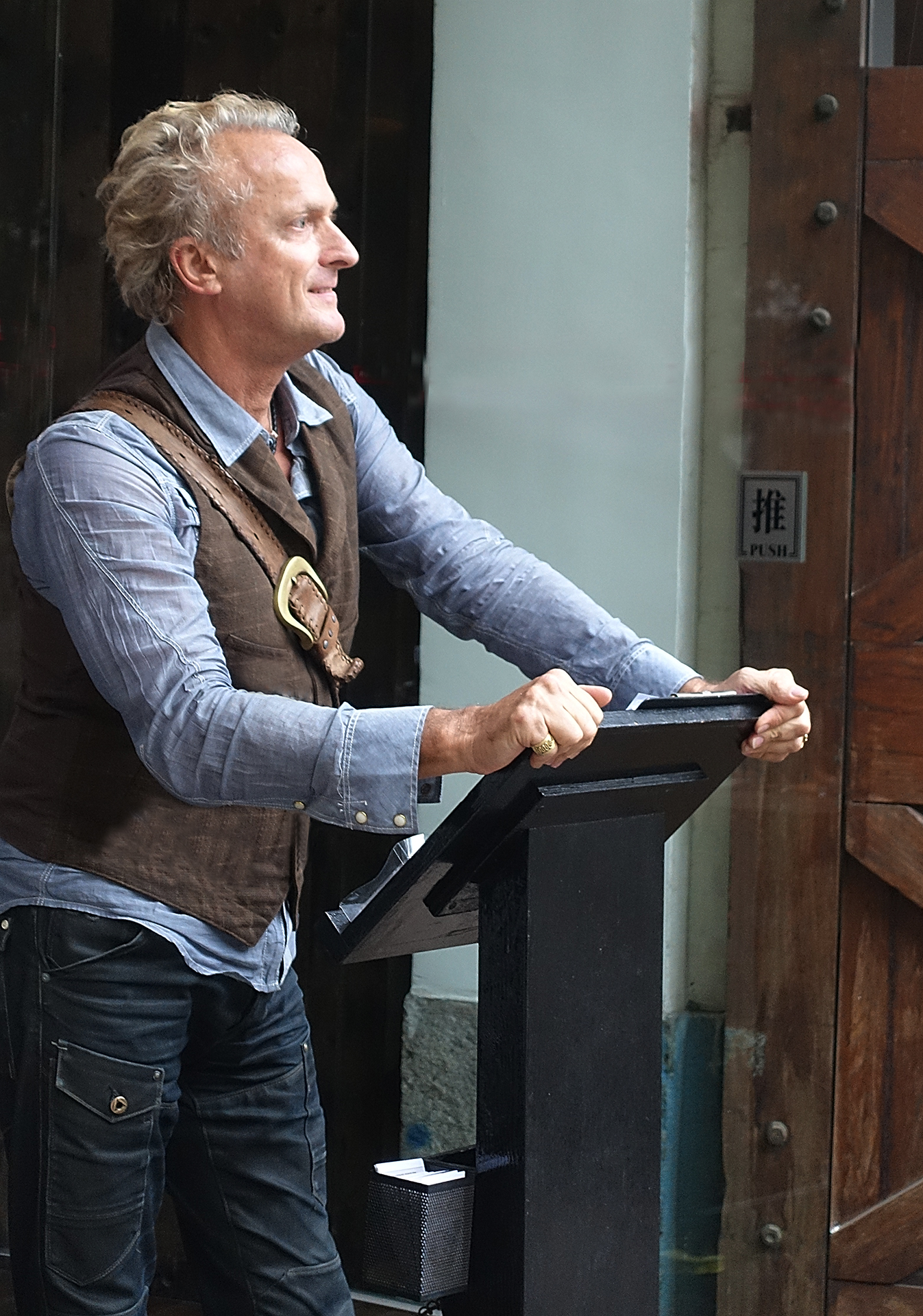
- Vermeulen, Hong Kong, November 2014
- Born: December 9, 1954 (age 71); Eindhoven, Netherlands
- Education: autodidact
- Occupations: Multi-media artist, photographer, film director, producer, composer, musician-singer-songwriter, writer, publisher.
- Years active: 1976–present
- Known for: Film books, sculptures, installations, movies and music.
- Spouse: Cecile Vandeursen 1976-2009 until death
- Website: www.alexvermeulen.com

SOH Alex Vermeulen, SOHQ, formerly known under the name Alex Vermeulen, is a Dutch artist known for his multimedia projects, films. film books and music.

SOH Alex Vermeulen is a contemporary Dutch multi-media artist who has worked under his own name as well as SOH-States of Humanity and Syndicaat Alex Vermeulen. Since 2015, he has worked exclusively under the name SOH Alex Vermeulen.

His work includes film books, films, performances, sculptures, installations, and contemporary music. A longtime resident of Amsterdam, in recent years, Vermeulen has divided his time between Amsterdam, the island of Bali, and Brooklyn, New York.

== Early life and education ==
Born in the southern city of Eindhoven, the Netherlands, Vermeulen is largely an autodidact. However, he studied psychology, philosophy, architecture and design at the Design Academy Eindhoven before launching off on his career in his mid-twenties. His primary early influences were film makers such as the Nouvelle Vague director Claude Chabrol and he got inspired by the obscure movie ""J'irai comme un cheval fou" (1973 (I Will Walk Like a Crazy Horse) by Fernando Arrabal, the absurdist movie Themroc (1973) by Claude Faraldo, the theatrical movie 'Querelle" (1982) by Rainer Werner Fassbinder and the cinematographic fantasy world of Georges Méliès (1862–1938). Vermeulen’s fascination with films would inspire him to put a new spin on an old form – film books. Usually produced to document an existing film, Vermeulen’s versions documented imaginary films in such a way that readers often assumed they were. His visual scripts thus played with the space between reality and imagination a theme seen throughout his work. This film book projects consisting a publication containing the film story with film-stills; on these stills Vermeulen's sculptures function as props.

== Recognition ==
Vermeulen would first achieve recognition in 1984, when the curators Van Abbemuseum, South Netherlands' began a long period of collaboration with the artist that would last for more than a decade. This would lead to exhibitions and purchases for their permanent collection.

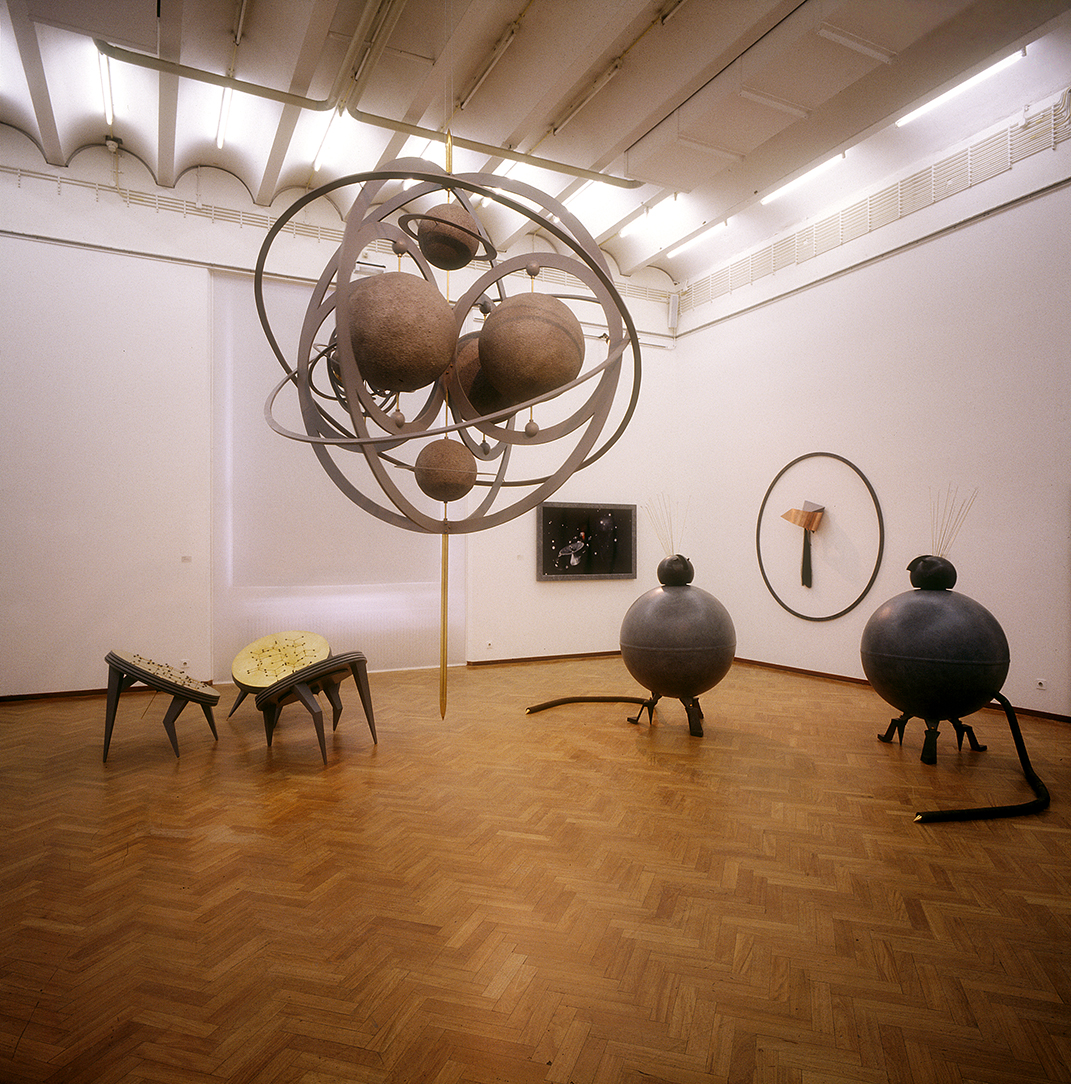
Fuga Futuri Stedelijk Museum

In 1993 Vermeulen moved to Amsterdam and founded in 1995 "SOH-States of Humanity" and the Syndicaat foundation. A year later he presented his final film-book, as part of a large installation, Fuga Futuri, at Amsterdam's Stedelijk Museum (1996). The chief character introduced in this show for the first time was the stylized humanoid "Eggy", named after his egg-like shape.

== Syndicaat Foundation ==
The Syndicaat Foundation operated as a production company for his projects. Concurrently, he terminated all collaborations with international galleries. He registered the trademark "SOH" (States Of Humanity), becoming the first artist to produce his work under a brand name.

== SOH-States of Humanity ==
Since 1996 Alex Vermeulen has been developing ‘States of Humanity” and started working under the name SOH Alex Vermeulen. SOH is a total-concept art project which consists of distinct parts. SOH focuses on themes regarding the counterpoints where the individual meets society: religion, violence, individualism, reflectivity, spirituality, contemplation, perceptivity and sexuality. SOH Alex Vermeulen uses films, photographs, sculptures, installations, music and interdisciplinary collaborations to represent the essence of our current ‘zeitgeist’. He questions the mechanisms fundamental to its existence, future direction, and our current dilemmas.

SOH is a work of art to which every participant makes a subjective contribution from their personal point of view and discipline. The various facets of the project come about because of this Gesamtkunstwerk.

So far, in collaboration with, among others, architect Greg Lynn, filmmaker Lodge Kerrigan, composer David Shea, performer Kate Strong, author Robert Greene etc. 31 SOH projects have been produced such as books, installations, exhibitions, sculptures in the public space, an Opera, iBooks, video clips, a feature film, etc.

== Most Notable Projects ==
- SOH1 The Architectonic film (in collaboration with 55 New Yorkers)
- SOH3 The Mental Urban Labyrinth,
- SOH10 The Opera (composer David Shea, performer Kate Strong)
- SOH19 States of Nature (in collaboration with the Technical University Eindhoven)
- SOH29 The Epic
- SOH17 The Mood Rooms

== Public Places ==
In the following fifteen years, sculptures of various forms of the enigmatic Eggy would appear in a number of projects mounted in public places around the world, including New York (1996), where Vermeulen asked those who passed to select their favourite Eggy and relate it to their personal life. These interviews were edited into a 43-minute documentary film, States of Humanity. Vermeulen used a small hi8 video camera to shoot the interviews and visuals of street life NYC. Vermeulen edited the footage. "These talking heads speak for themself." Since the film "States of Humanity" introduced the first six "Eggy" sculptures seen through the eyes of fifty-five New Yorkers, this documentary would become a key work in Vermeulen's career. The premiere was at the International Film Festival Rotterdam in 1997.

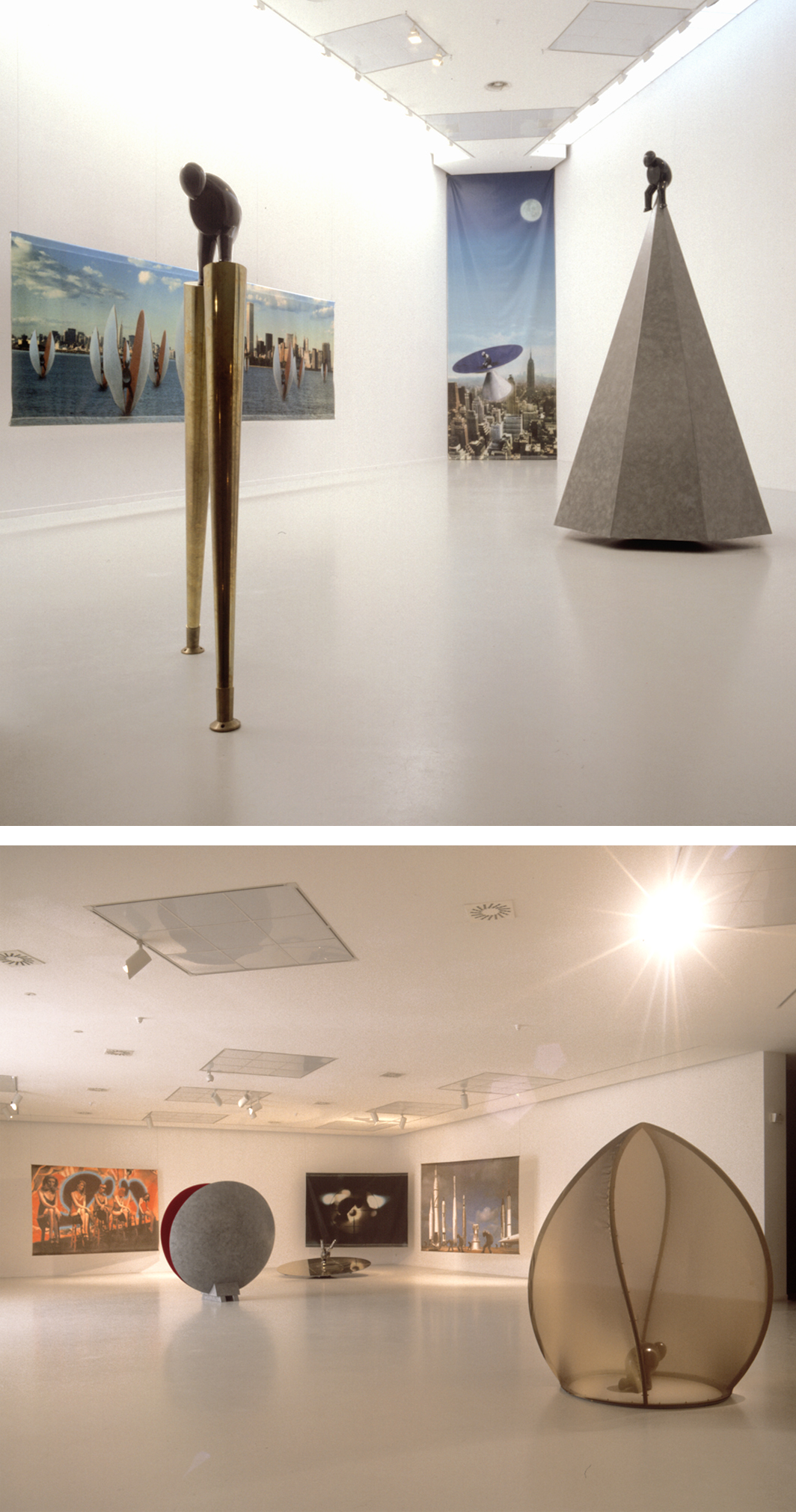
SOH1 Muhka

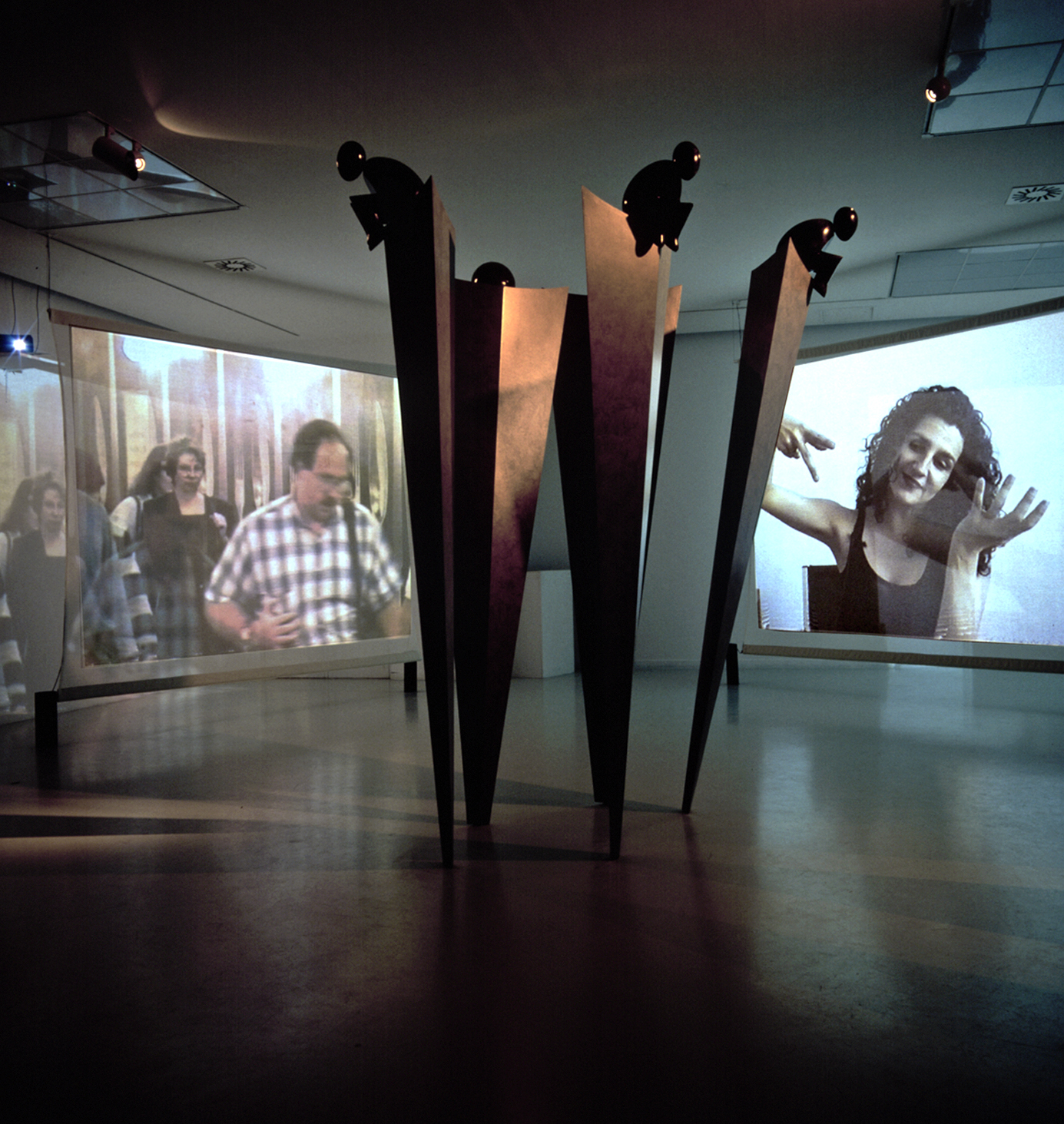
Arch. film muhka

== Multi Media Events ==
In the following years SOH Alex Vermeulen and Syndicaat produced more than 31 multi-media events including SOH3, the Mental Urban Labyrinth, with curator Jan Debbaut, at the Van Abbemuseum and SOH1, the Architectural Film at MuHKA, the Museum for Contemporary Art in Antwerp, Belgium, both in 1999. In April 2000 he edited the artist edition trailer of American Psycho presented at the premiere in New York.

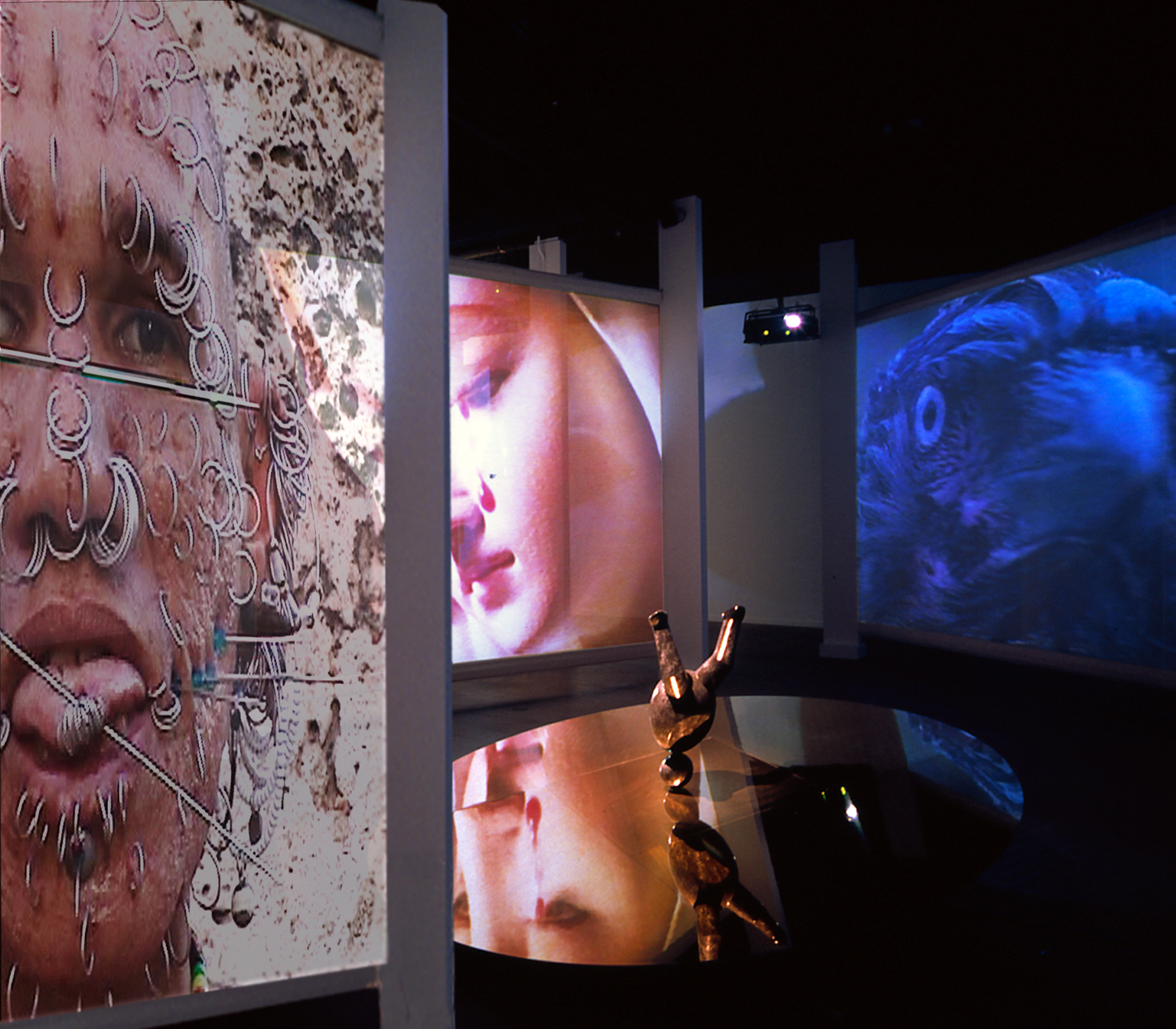
SOH3-the-Mental-Urban-Labyrinth

The book States of Humanity (1999) was released with these two exhibitions. The States of Humanity book is to be a travel guide for a present-day metropolis: a manual full of cross-references, coincidences, allusions, stories, pictures, and associations. The structure of the publication should give 'the visitor' a feeling that the different components refer to the planological structure of an imaginary world - a conglomerate of alleyways, streets, boulevards and squares, each with its own character and social traffic. Vermeulen has invited the following writers to act as 'architects' for the planology of the book: filmmaker Lodge Kerrigan, the philosophers Arthur Danto and Richard Shusterman, composer David Shea, architect Greg Lynn, the writing team Martin and Annette Meyers, director of interdisciplinary dance theater Ron Bunzl and the author Robert Greene (American author), author of books on strategy. In 2003, Vermeulen collaborated with composer David Shea to write and direct "The Opera" for the Holland Festival. Claire Van Der Poel captured the production process of "SOH10 The Opera" in her documentary film titled: SOH10 the Opera promo documentary.

== Films ==
Beginning in 2000 Vermeulen directed a series of films including. For the Nederlandse Programma Stichting he directed the short dance movie One Ride Pony (2000). for the European Union sponsored Democracy Conference SOH13 the Power of Collective Intelligence and Awareness (2004). For the Holland Festival, Amsterdam (NL) he directed cinematographic opera: SOH10 the Opera (2003-2008) in collaboration with composer David Shea The Opera, a film partially recorded and simultaneously presented alongside a live performance at the Holland Festival in 2003, aimed to create a seamless blend of onstage action and film fragments, resulting in a total theatre experience. The live performance was captured on stage and later edited into the film, with the goal of releasing the entire project as an independent feature. It was only in 2022 that Vermeulen completed the feature film. For personal reasons, Vermeulen was not able to finish the film earlier.

== Art and Technology ==
In 2006 SOH Alex Vermeulen mounted an installation with 88 large black polyester eggs topped with solar panels floating in a pond at Eindhoven University of Technology (NL). Dubbed "SOH19 States of Nature," the project combines physics, art, technology, spirituality, solar cult, and sustainable energy. Created in association with the Natuurkunst Foundation and some Applied Physics university students, the aim of this self-sustained installation is to lift a levitating Buddha sculpture using the sun's energy!

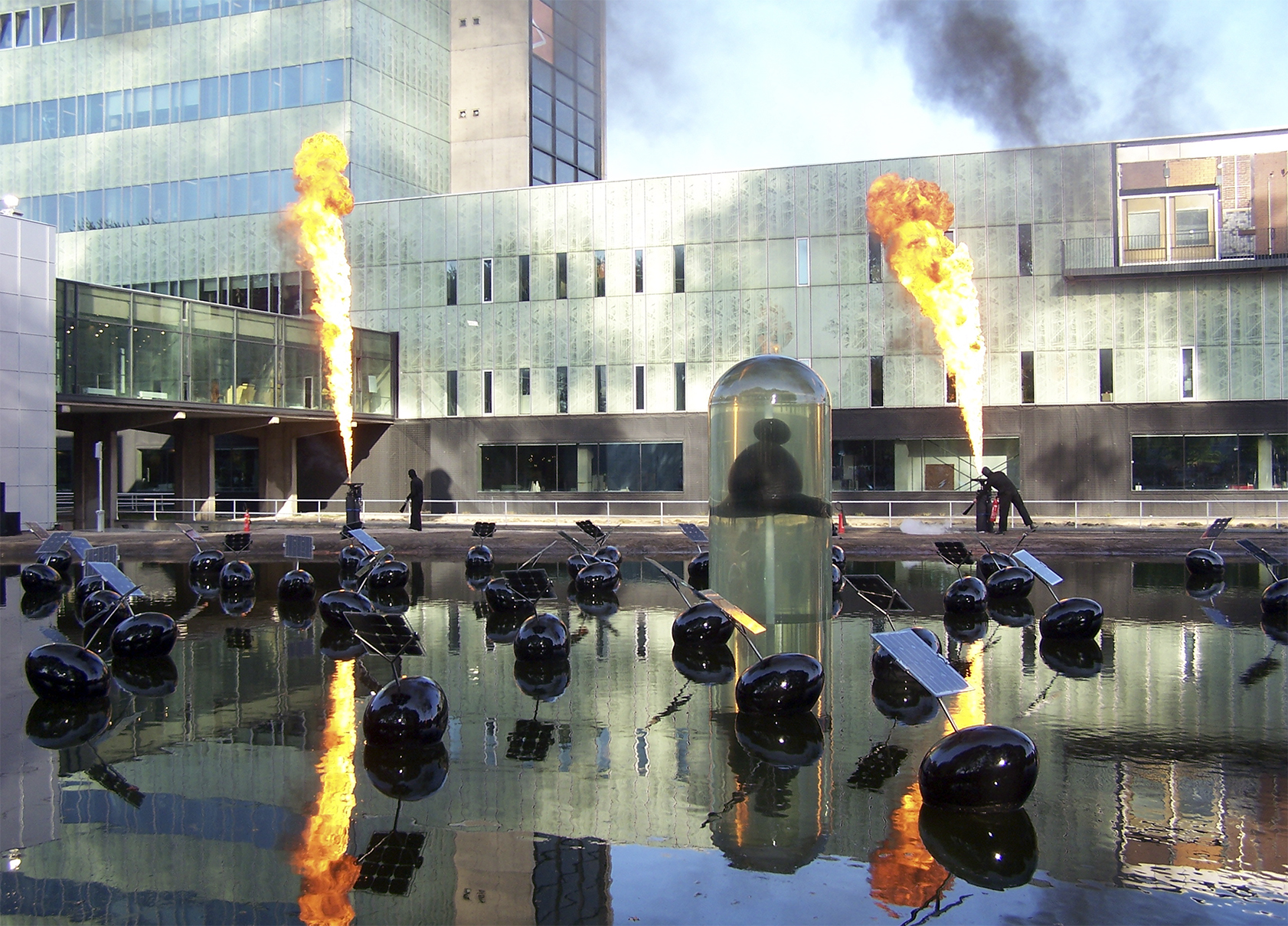
SOH19 States of Nature

Part of the project was the release of the international catalogue : SOH19 States of Nature; Sun enlightenment Which tells the story of the evolution of the project and its participants, focussing on topics like physics and art, technology and spirituality, solar cult and sustainable energy, biological processes and social interaction. Essays from (a.o.) Marcel Möring (‘the Great Longing’), Vincent Icke (astrophysicist), Robert Greene (‘The 48 Laws of Power’), IJsbrand van Veelen (VPRO), Koert van Mensvoort (TU/e) en Jan van Adrichem (Stedelijk Museum Amsterdam). SOH Alex Vermeulen & Frans Snik (ed.), SOH19 States of Nature; Sun enlightenment, Pijama Publishers, 144 p., release September 12, 2006

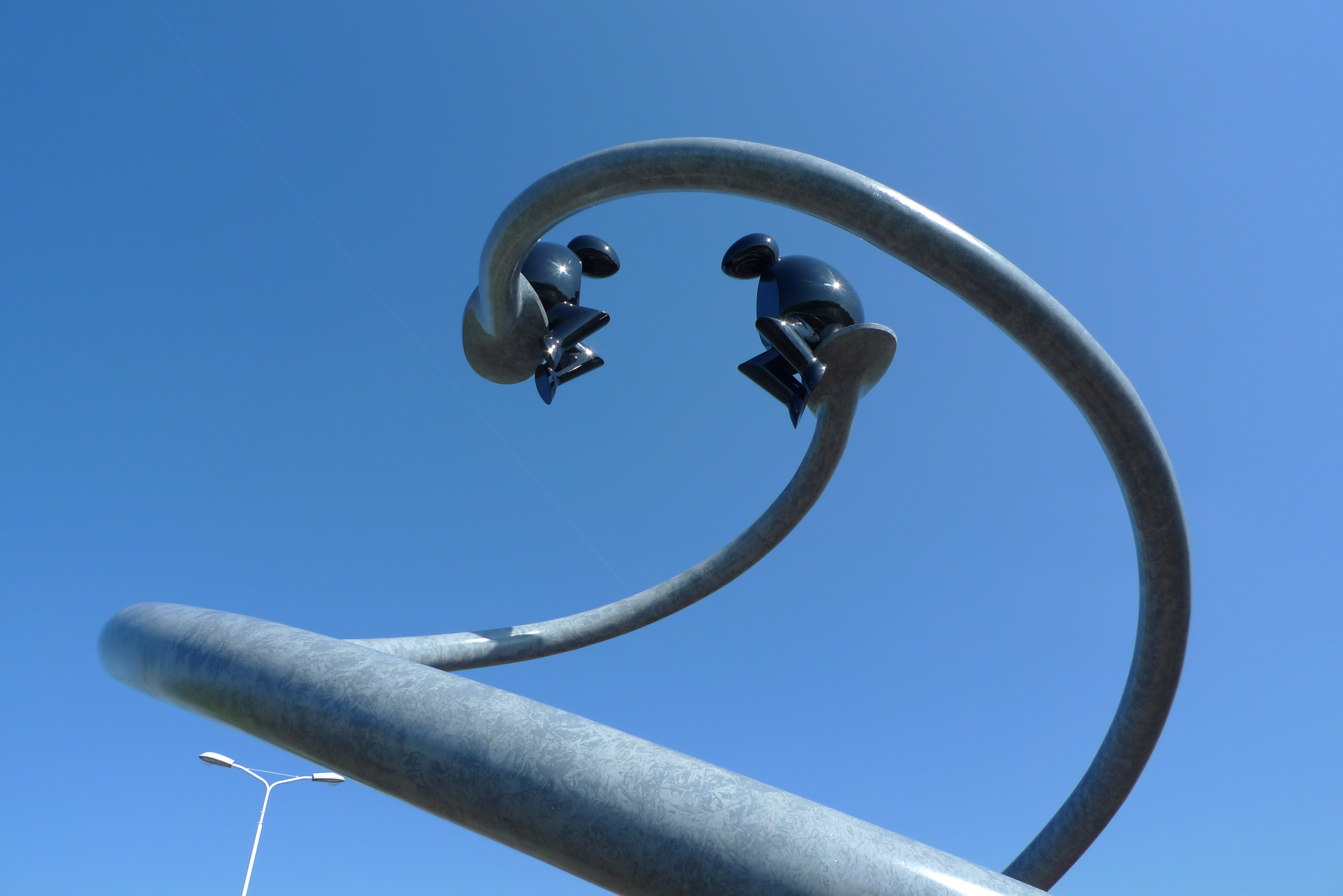
Raalte Heeten detail 2008

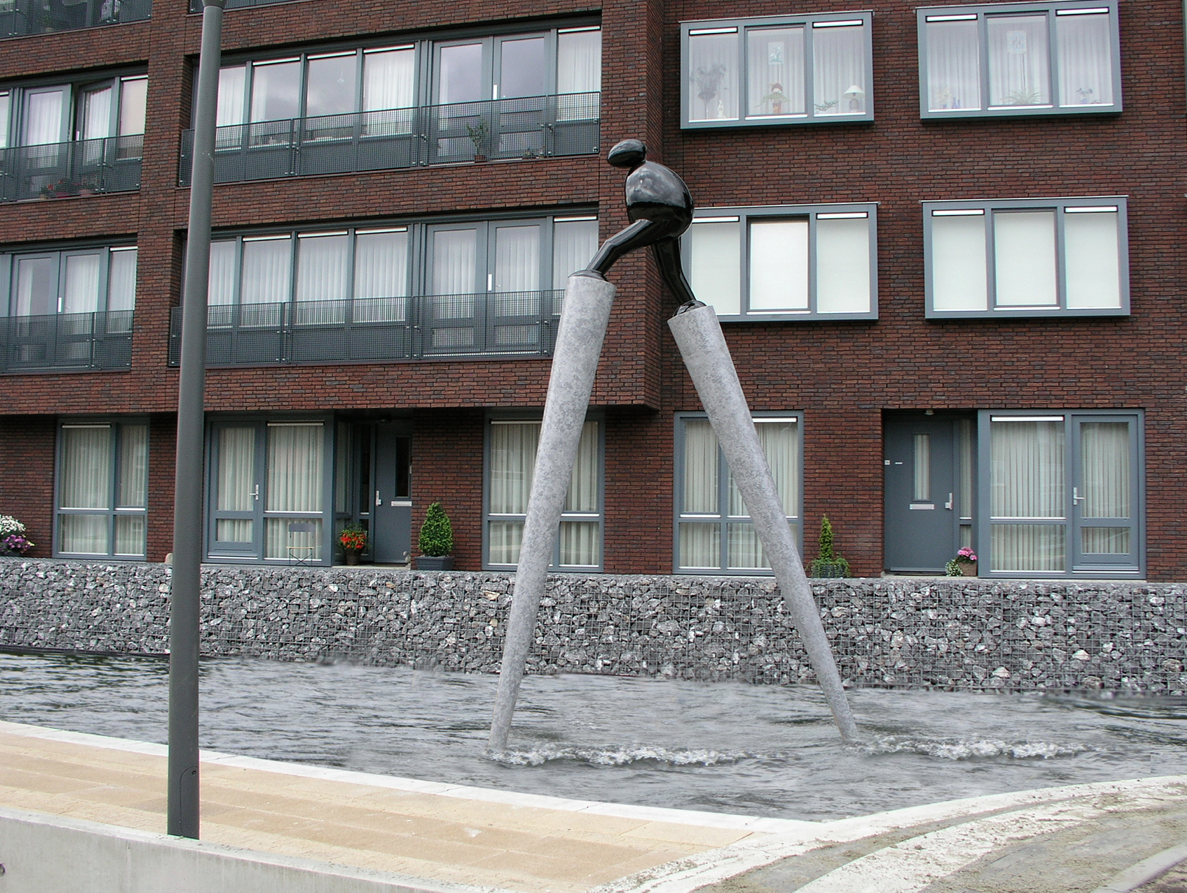
Landgoed Driesen steltloper

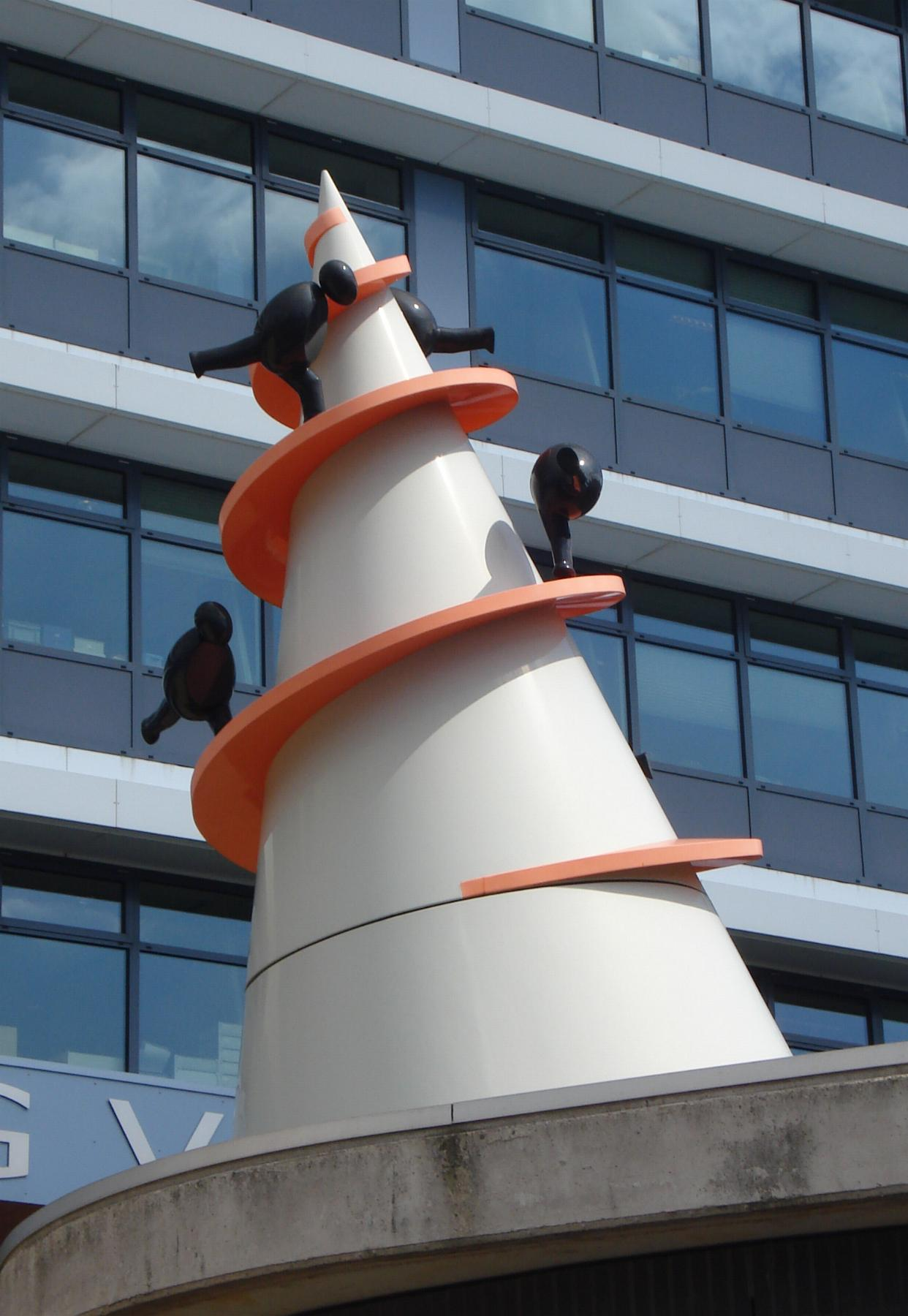
Rijswijk kunstwerk states of humanity

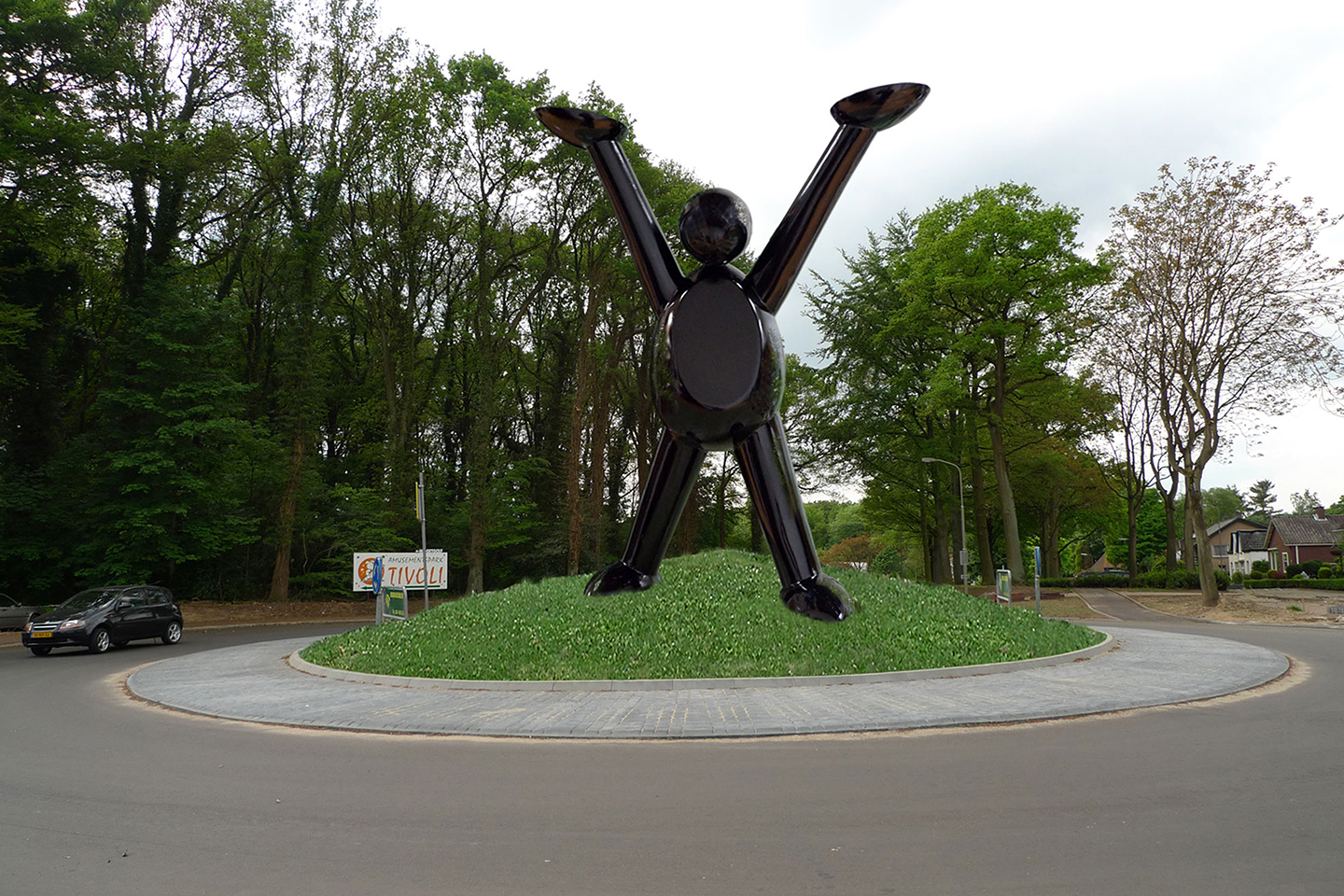
Last Eggy Sculpture

== Later Work ==
In 2012 Vermeulen has stopped producing Eggy sculptures. All Eggies so far did not have any arms. However the last Eggy has arms; which could either express a "Hurray" or form together with the legs a X shape, a symbol that could be seen as a reference to the unknown. At the same time Vermeulen closed his studio in Amsterdam. In 2014 he set up new studios in both Bali and New York City. For political reasons, he permanently closed his New York studio in 2017.

== The Epic ==
In 2013, Vermeulen began working on a new cinematographic project, The Epic is a multifaceted collaborative project loosely based on the Ramayana Epic written by Valmiki and the tragedy Othello by William Shakespeare and takes place in a sprawling Asian metropolis named Raksasa Kota (City of the Future) in the year 2088. The stars of the production are a group of young Balinese dancers between the ages of six and ten. Rien Bekkers designed the sumptuous costumes. The music is composed by David Shea. The large interactive installation will consist of a series of monumental photos, a suggested feature written and directed by Vermeulen shot in collaboration, among others, with photographer Doddy Obenk.

As part of the production, Dutch filmmaker Peter Mariouw Smit, has been directed a documentary, The Epic: Behind the Scenes.

== Setbacks ==
"THE EPIC" project faced multiple interruptions and setbacks. Initially conceived as an exhibition featuring 32 significant photographic works and detailed costumes, the entire exhibition tour was postponed and subsequently cancelled, particularly during the COVID period. In 2024, "THE EPIC" is set to be launched as a digital/interactive book, incorporating a narrative alongside 102 photographic works. Beyond visual elements, the book encompasses diverse content, including a three-episode video animation mini-series, the documentary 'The Epic Behind the Scenes,' and the official trailer.

== Frequency Art Projects ==
During the period 2015-2019, Vermeulen conducted, in collaboration with Eindhoven University of Technology the Netherlands, a study into the effect of frequencies on human emotions. Previous projects such as SOH17 the Mood Rooms experimented with the effect of frequencies on people and animals. (2006-2009). In 2019 he developed the project SOH30 The Sonic Service Station using his experiences of former experiments. Vermeulen conducted one-on-one sessions featuring live ambient music that incorporated various studied frequencies. Vermeulen conducted one-on-one sessions featuring live ambient music that incorporated various studied frequencies. One of these compositions was recorded and released in 2020 as the record Jain Siddhapratima Yantra

== The Mood Rooms ==
SOH17: The Mood Rooms is a collection of three autonomous, architectural installations designed to continuously stimulate the senses, prompting the brain to generate specific 'moods.' The central theme of the Mood Rooms revolves around the constant interplay between the human body's physical, mental, and emotional aspects.

This project actively engages all the senses, playing a significant role in shaping the visitor's perception. Spectators experience the work on mental, physical, spiritual, and emotional levels. The installations serve as instruments that appeal to the senses, manipulated through a diverse 'palette' of media, and resonate with each individual's frame of reference. In this regard, the visitor actively participates in the artwork – an immersive experience that directly influences a person's perception.

SOH17: The Mood Rooms is a collaborative project featuring a multimedia artist, SOH Alex Vermeulen; a designer, Gilian Schrofer (Concern); a composer, Mads Nordheim; and an architect, Theo Deutinger (TD architects). In 2025 The Mood Rooms will be shown in several locations in Europe.

== Music career ==
SOH Alex Vermeulen is an artist and musician whose career began with a passion for music at a young age. Around the age of nine, he formed his first band, an experience that sparked a lifelong dedication to artistic expression. In the 1980s, Vermeulen experimented with merging music and visual elements by incorporating film projections into live performances, creating a unique fusion of sound and imagery.

In recent years, after a music sabbatical in Spain, Vermeulen shifted his focus entirely to music, concluding his career as a visual artist. He donated his artwork to museums and health institutions, leaving nothing in storage, as he felt he had achieved his goals in the visual arts. Vermeulen sees risk as essential to creativity and innovation, embracing this new phase with determination.

In 2024, fully dedicated to music, Vermeulen released several singles among others Knock Knock Who's There and One Only Knows, with an album, "Autobiographical vol 1", scheduled for release in 2025. He has adopted the name 'SOHQ’ for his music career, with the 'Q' referencing his middle name, Quirinus. The "Qui" in Quirinus, meaning "Who" in Latin, symbolises the start of a new era for the artist. Vermeulen is driven by a renewed passion and is committed to making his mark in the music industry, once again pursuing a childhood dream.

On December 9, 2025, Vermeulen releases his first full-length album, Autobiographical Vol. 1. The album serves as the opening chapter of a multi-volume autobiographical series, each release reflecting a synthesis of experiences, perceptions, and reflections rather than following a chronological narrative. The song Grief forms the emotional center of Vol. 1, exploring transformation and perception in the process of loss. The piece was written in memory of Vermeulen's late partner, choreographer and producer Cecile Vandeursen. Vermeulen finished his second album, Autobiographical Vol. 2, in collaboration with violinist Sybille Néant. On June 11, 2026, he released the single "Zeroes", accompanied by a music video. On October 8, 2026, he released Autobiographical Vol. 2: Absolute Beginner, the second full-length album in the series. The collaboration with violinist Sybille Néant, which began with the second volume, is further developed throughout the album. Bassist and vocalist Vera Reed performs on every track, while Vermeulen also collaborated with multi-instrumentalist Olia Vale, who contributes saxophone, melodion, keyboards, and vocals.

The Autobiographical series coincides with Vermeulen’s fiftieth anniversary as a professional artist and precedes a retrospective exhibition program planned across four museums in 2026–2027.

== Personal life ==
On December 1, 2009, Cecile Vandeursen, dancer/choreographer, producer at the Syndicaat Foundation, and spouse of Vermeulen, died. They had shared a life and professional collaboration for 33 years. Her death significantly affected the production process, leading to the postponement of all ongoing projects. In response, Vermeulen took a three-year sabbatical. In 2013 he resumed his unfinished projects and initiated new projects. In 2019, he was engaged in a motorcycle accident, facing a two-year challenge with enduring blindness in his left eye. He successfully recovered 95% of his vision following a series of operations.

== Philanthropy ==
In 2023, Vermeulen contributed numerous sculptures to hospitals and healthcare institutions for permanent installation. Additionally, he made substantial art donations to various museums.

== Gallery ==
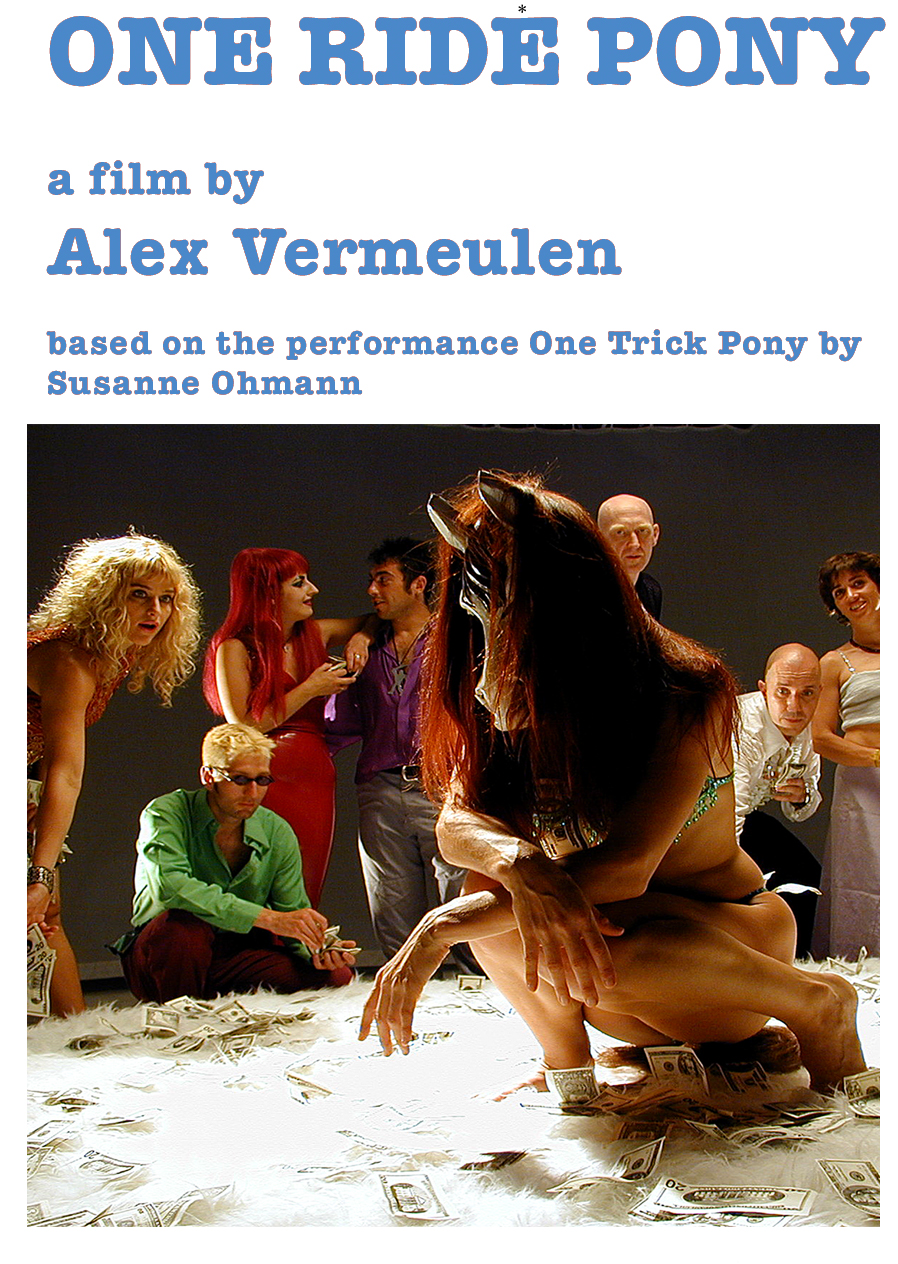
One Ride Pony a film by Alex Vermeulen

== Solo exhibitions and projects ==
(selection)

1984 - "Het Avontuur der Verwondering" Van Abbemuseum, Eindhoven (NL) (catalogue)

1986 - "No one but Onno Trueman" Van Abbemuseum, Eindhoven (NL) (catalogue)

1996 - "Fuga Futuri", Stedelijk museum, Amsterdam (NL) (catalogue)

1999 - SOH1 (States of Humanity) Museum of Contemporary Art, Antwerpen (B) (catalogue)

1999 - SOH3 The Mental Urban Labyrinth, Van Abbemuseum, Eindhoven (NL) (catalogue)

2000 - SOH7 The Urban Fashion Crank Lab, Cerruty New York City (USA)

2000 - Artist edition of the trailer of the feature film "American Psycho" a film by Mary Haron showed at the premiere, New York City (USA)

2005 - SOH16 Tour des Sens, deWatertoren AK, Vlissingen (NL)

2003 - SOH10 the Opera, Holland Festival (NL)

2006 - SOH19 States of Nature, Performance featuring Eddy De Clercq and Erik Hobijn Technical University Eindhoven TU/e (NL)

2007 - SOH23 You know why I am so happy?! Gallerie Annette de Keyser, Antwerpen (B)

2017 - SOH19 States of Nature, performance with the Tesla Coil, featuring Eddy de Clercq, Technical University Eindhoven TU/e (NL)

2018 - SOH29 the Epic, TONYRAKA gallery, Mas, Ubud Bali, premiere October 9, 2018

2018 - SOH29 the Epic, performance of the actors in the original costumes, October 27 at TONYRAKA gallery, Mas, Ubud Bali

2018 - SOH29 the Epic, Jakarta, Kerta Niaga Gallery, Jakarta

2019 - SOH29 the Epic, het Erasmus Huis, Jakarta

2026 - SOH17 The Mood Rooms

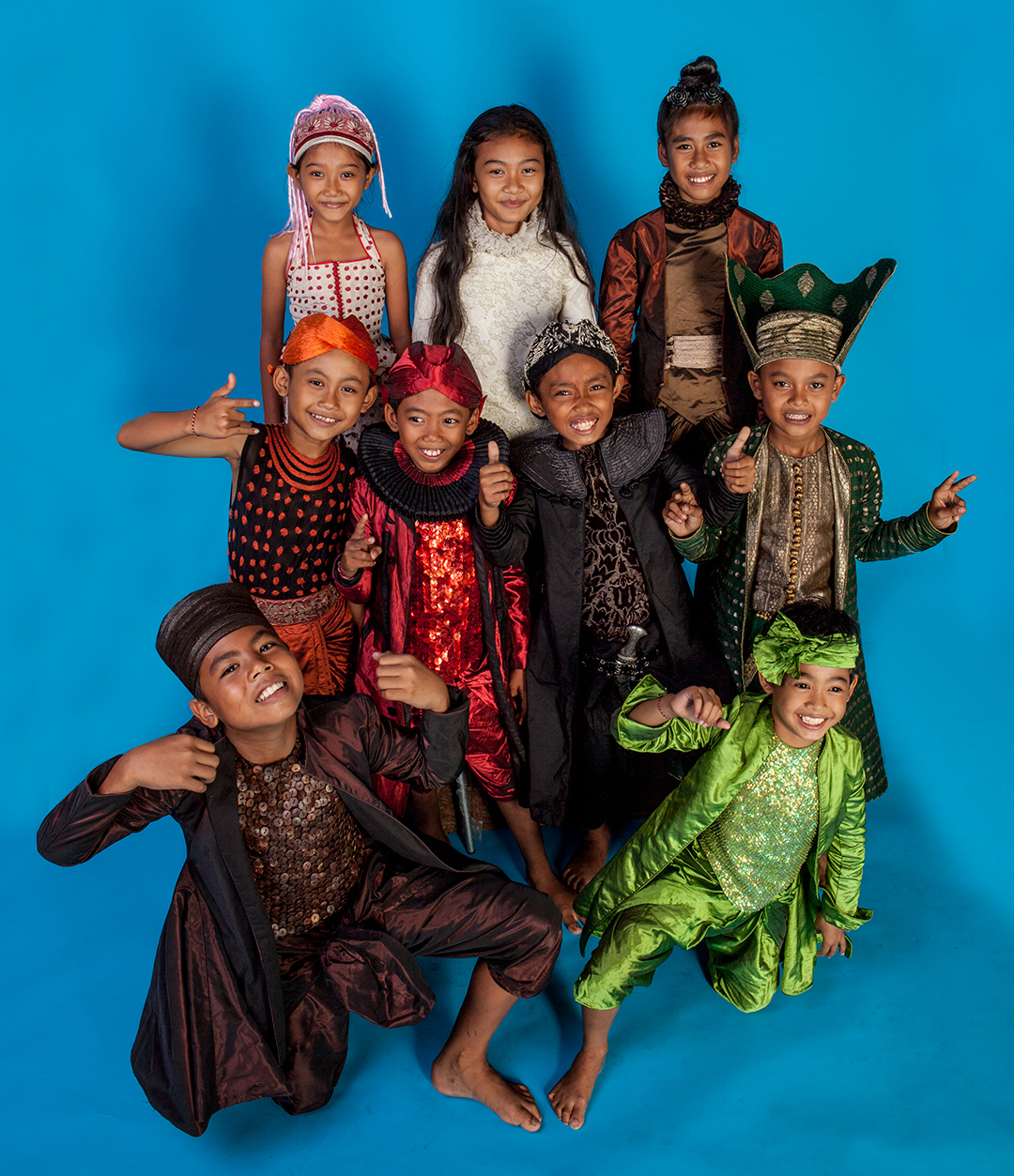
The epic-cast-Alex-Vermeulen

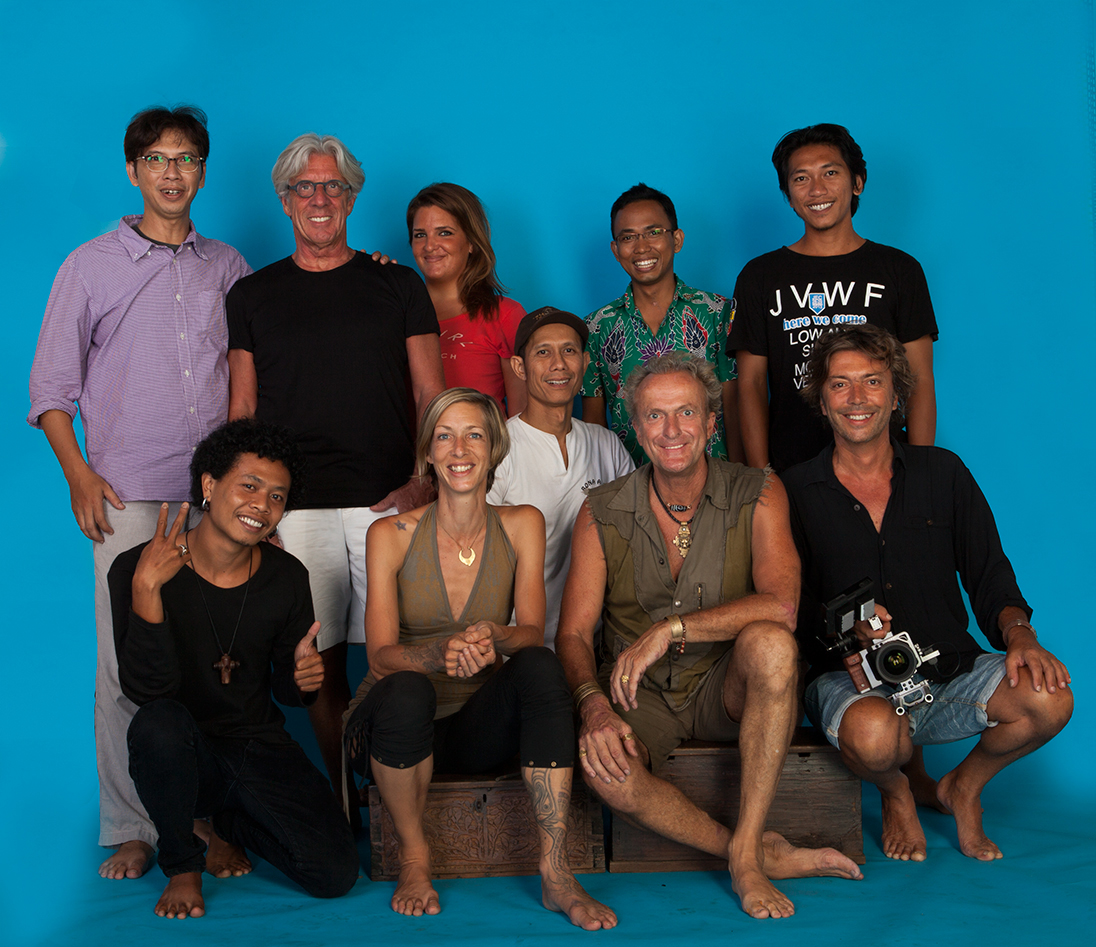
Alex Vermeulen, The-Epic-crew

== Films ==
(selection)

1994 - "Ballroom da Capo", 16mm zw/w & colour 12" dansfilm in collaboration with choreographer Cecile Vandeursen

1996 - "States of Humanity" documentary, Betacam 45", première: 28th International Film Festival Rotterdam

1997 - "Cewek" video 3" DVcam 6" dance film in collaboration with choreographer Cecile Vandeursen

1999 - Dishhunt in collaboration with Joop van Brakel video clip MTV Betacam SP 4"

1999 - SOH2 the Urban Hyper Video & Sound Experience in collaboration with David Shea, Montevideo TBA, Amsterdam (NL)

1999 - SOH4 the Urban Crank Lab, De Fabriek, Eindhoven (NL)

1999 - SOH5 the Urban Hyper Video & Sound Experience in collaboration with David Shea, World Wide Video Festival, Amsterdam (NL)

1999 - SOH6 The Mental Urban Labyrinth Book presentation, in collaboration with Arthur Danto, the New Museum of Contemporary Art, NYC (USA)

1999 - SOH7 the Urban Fashion Crank Lab, the Artist edition of the trailer of "American Psycho", in collaboration with Cerruti Madison Avenue, New York/Hollywood (USA)

2000 - "One Ride Poney" 35mm film 12", dansfilm in collaboration with performer Susanne Ohmann and choreographer Cecile Vandeursen, NPS / BBC (NL/UK)

2003 - SOH10 the Opera in collaboration with composer David Shea, performer Kate Strong and choreographer Cecile Vandeursen; première: Holland Festival 2003 (NL/FR)

2003 - SOH10 promo (documentary by Claire van de Poel)

2004 - SOH13 The Power of Collective Intelligence and Awareness DVD / live performed at het Vredes Paleis, the Hague (NL) performed before the European Union (B)

2006 - SOH22 We all do it, den Bosch (NL)

2006 - SOH19 States of Nature TU/e collaboration project studenten Natuurkunde (documentary by Bart van Broekhoven)

2018 - The Epic Behind the Scenes (documentary by Peter Mariouw Smit). Premiere: September 27, Balinale, The International Film Festival Bali 2018

2022 - The Opera, the feature film - The Epic, a three-episode miniseries

== Bibliography ==
- 1985: Het avond-uur der verwondering, OCLC 71646452
- 1986: En passant Baltimore Krüger, ISBN 978-9071584039
- 1988: Alleen Onno Trueman (Engelse editie: No one but Onno Trueman), ISBN 978-9070149239
- 1992: Terra refrigera, ISBN 978-9071584121
- 1996: Fuga Futuri, ISBN 3-926820-43-8
- 1999 SOH (States of Humanity), MuHKA / van Abbemuseum ISBN 9789056621117
- 2006 Sun Enlightenment (SOH19 States of Nature) Technical University Eindhoven (TU/e) ISBN 978-1762457905
- 2018 the Epic (WebBook) Book Launch at the Ubud Writers and Readers Festival October 26, 2018
- 2024 the Epic digital book

== Public Space ==
(selection)

1992 - "Well in time", A.V.I. west, Amsterdam (NL)

1992 - "Rebirth of the Rebirth II" Ziekenfondsraad, Amstelveen (NL)

1994 - "Friend's connection", Hoge School voor Toerisme en Verkeer, Breda (NL)

1995 - Multiple not multiple, balance, MBO college, de Leijgraaf, Veghel (NL)

1996 - Me oh my, Ahold, Zaandam

1996 - SOH ps1 (States of Humanity) Zonder titel, water pump station De Haere, WMG Gelderland (NL)

1997 - "The most profitable Technical Innovation Award" Akzo Nobel Coatings Akzo Nobel, Arnhem

1999 - SOH ps2 (States of Humanity), Oirschot at A58 (NL)

1999 - SOH ps3 (States of Humanity), Woonaard, Alkmaar (NL)

1999 - SOH ps4 (States of Humanity), Hoogland, community Amersfoort (NL)

2000 - SOH ps5 (States of Humanity), Dongen, GGV Midden Brabant, Tilburg (NL)

2001 - SOH ps6 (States of Humanity), Hessenpoort, Zwolle (NL)

2001 - SOH ps7 (States of Humanity), sculpture design Wildehoarne, Joure (NL)

2001 - SOH ps8 (States of Humanity), sculpture design, Diemen (NL)2001

2002 - SOH ps6 (States of Humanity), Hessenpoort, Gemeente Zwolle (NL)

2002 - SOH ps10 (States of Humanity), Land Mark Verrijn Stuart Diemen (NL)

2002 - SOH ps11 (States of Humanity), concept development SITE, a new museum for Almere (NL)

2002 - SOH ps12 (States of Humanity), design Rijswijk (NL)

2002 - SOH19 States of Nature, development project, Technical University Eindhoven TU/e (NL)

2003 - SOH ps13 (States of Humanity), schetsontwerp Adriaan Stoopplein, Bloemendaal (NL)

2003 - SOH ps14 (States of Humanity), Stadhuis Rijswijk (NL)

2003 - SOH ps15 (States of Humanity), sculpture design rotonde Daalmeer, Alkmaar (NL)

2003 - SOH19 States of Nature, development project, Technical University Eindhoven TU/e, (NL)

2004 - SOH ps16 (States of Humanity), "The Coatings Innovation Award", Akzo Nobel, Arnhem (NL/GB)

2004 - SOH19 States of Nature, development project, Technical University Eindhoven TU/e (NL)

2006 - SOH19 States of Nature, Technical University Eindhoven TU/e (NL)

2007 - SOH ps 20(States of Humanity) Landgoed Driessen (NL)

2008 - SOH ps17 Raalte / Heeten (NL)

2009 - SOH ps18 MN services, Rijswijk (NL)

2009 - SOH ps19 Terneuzen (NL)

2019 - SOH19 States of Nature part II, Technical University Eindhoven TU/e (NL)
