= SOHS =

SOHS may refer to:

== High schools ==
- Sonora High School, La Habra, California, United States
- South Oldham High School, Crestwood, Kentucky, United States
- South Otago High School, Balclutha, New Zealand
- Stanford Online High School, Redwood City, California

== Other uses ==
- Secretary of Homeland Security, United States Department of Homeland Security
- Southern Oregon Historical Society, Jacksonville, Oregon, USA
- School of Health Sciences, University of Dar es Salaam, Dar es Salaam, Tanzania

== See also ==
- SOH (disambiguation)
