= SOH-States of Humanity =

Multimedia art project

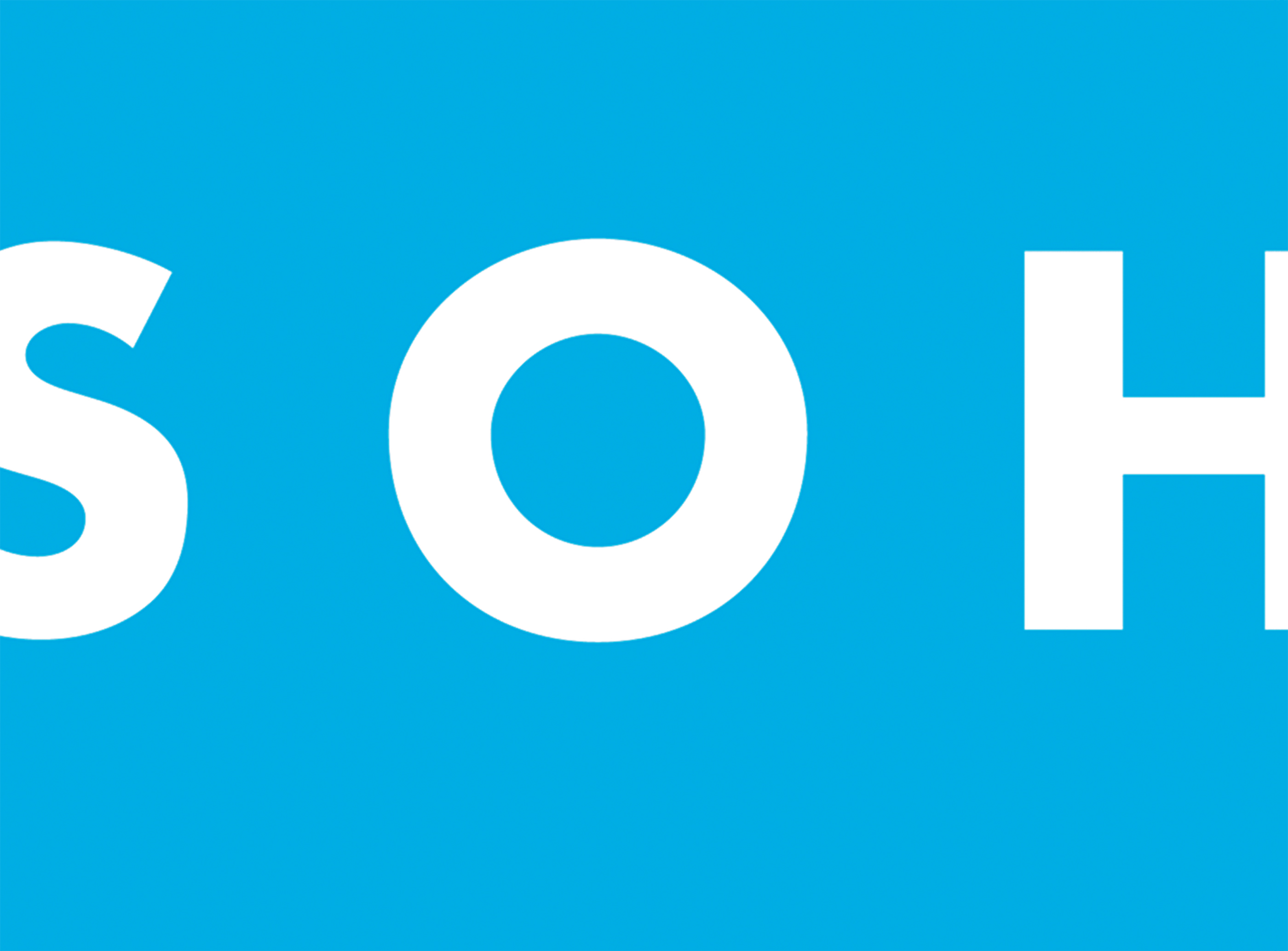
SOH-States of Humanity logo

SOH is an abbreviation for States of Humanity and is an initiative of multimedia artist Alex Vermeulen, which led to an interdisciplinary Gesamtkunstwerk.

== the SOH concept ==
Since 1996 Alex Vermeulen has been developing ‘States of Humanity”; a total-concept art project which consists of distinct parts. SOH focuses on themes regarding the counterpoints where the individual meets society: religion, violence, individualism, reflectivity, spirituality, contemplation, perceptivity and sexuality. Alex Vermeulen uses films, photographs, sculptures, installations, and interdisciplinary collaborations to represent the essence of our current ‘zeitgeist’. He questions the mechanisms fundamental to its existence, future direction, and the dilemmas we face today.

SOH is a comprehensive work of art to which every participant makes a subjective contribution, from their personal point of view and discipline. The various facets of the project come about because of this Gesamtkunstwerk.

== Results ==
So far, in collaboration with, among others, architect Greg Lynn, filmmaker Lodge Kerrigan, composer David Shea, performer Kate Strong, author Robert Greene etc. 29 SOH project have been produced such as books, installations, exhibitions, sculptures in the public space. an Opera, iBooks, video clips, a feature film etc.

== Most notable projects ==
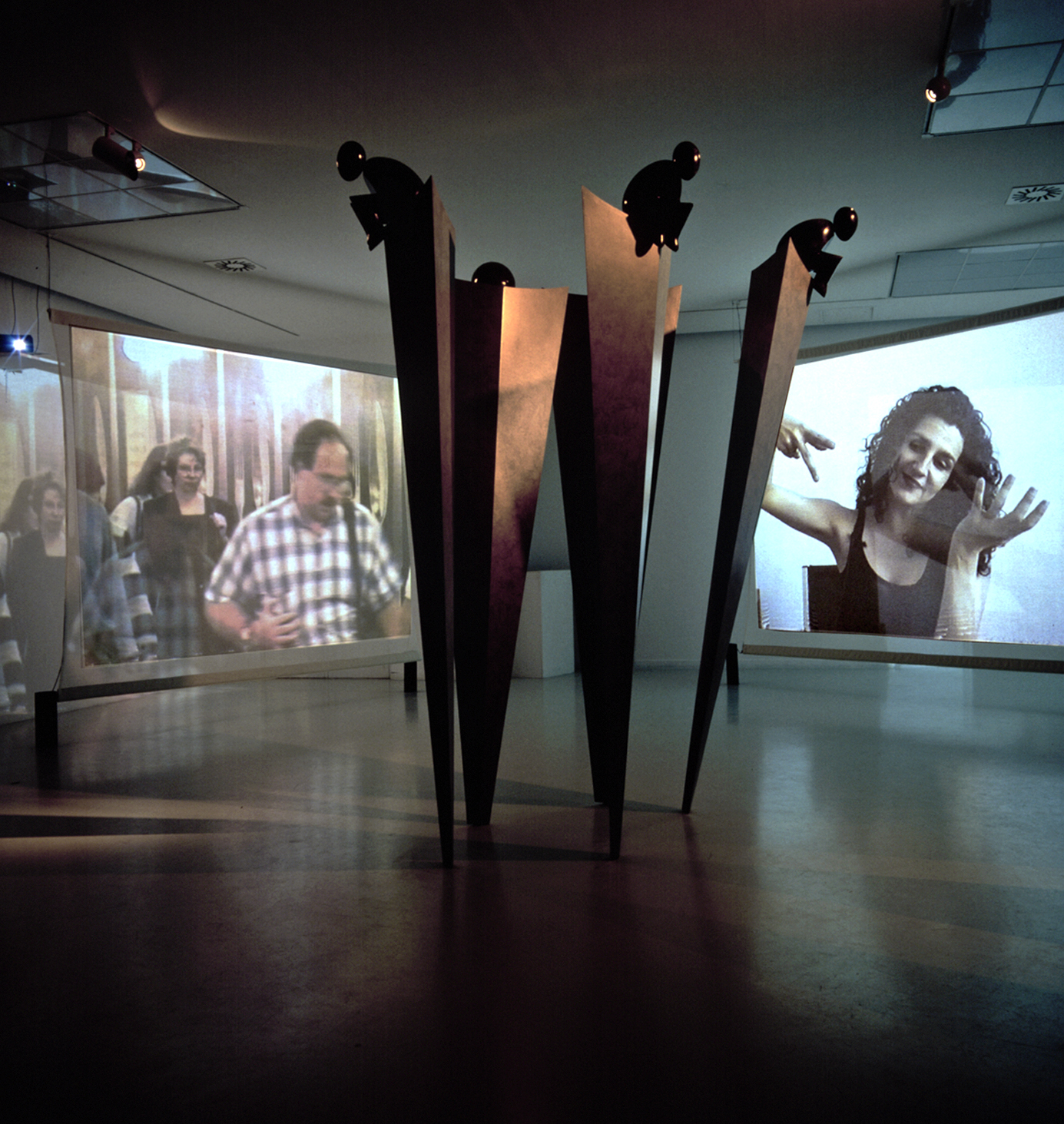
Arch. film muhka

- SOH1 the Architectural Film (in collaboration with 55 New Yorkers)
- SOH10 the Opera (composer David Shea, performer Kate Strong)
- SOH19 States of Nature (in collaboration with the Technical University Eindhoven)
